= Deyo =

Deyo is a surname. Notable people with the surname include:

- Abraham A. Deyo (1793–1873), New York politician
- Amanda Deyo (1838–1917) American Universalist minister, pacifist, and correspondent
- Andre Deyo (born 1978), American R&B singer and songwriter, better known by his stage name mrDEYO
- Blanche Deyo (died 1933), American Broadway actress and vaudeville dancer
- Israel T. Deyo (1854–1953), American politician and lawyer
- Jeff Deyo (born 1969), American Contemporary Christian music solo artist and worship leader
- Martin W. Deyo (1902–1951), New York politician and judge
- Morton Deyo (1887–1973), US Navy admiral
- Peter Deyo (born 1957), American sprint canoer
- Solomon Deyo (1850–1922), the engineer in charge of constructing the first line of the New York City Subway
- Tony Deyo, comedian from New York City

== See also ==
- DuBois-Deyo House, a historic home in Rosendale, Ulster County, New York
- USS Deyo, a US Navy destroyer
