= Charles Edward Fuller =

Charles Edward Fuller may refer to:

- Charles E. Fuller (Baptist minister) (1887–1968), American Christian clergyman and radio evangelist
- Charles E. Fuller (New York politician) (1847–1925), New York farmer and politician

== See also ==
- Charles Fuller (disambiguation)
