= Cole's Hill =

Historic cemetery in Massachusetts, United States

- U.S. National Register of Historic Places
- U.S. National Historic Landmark
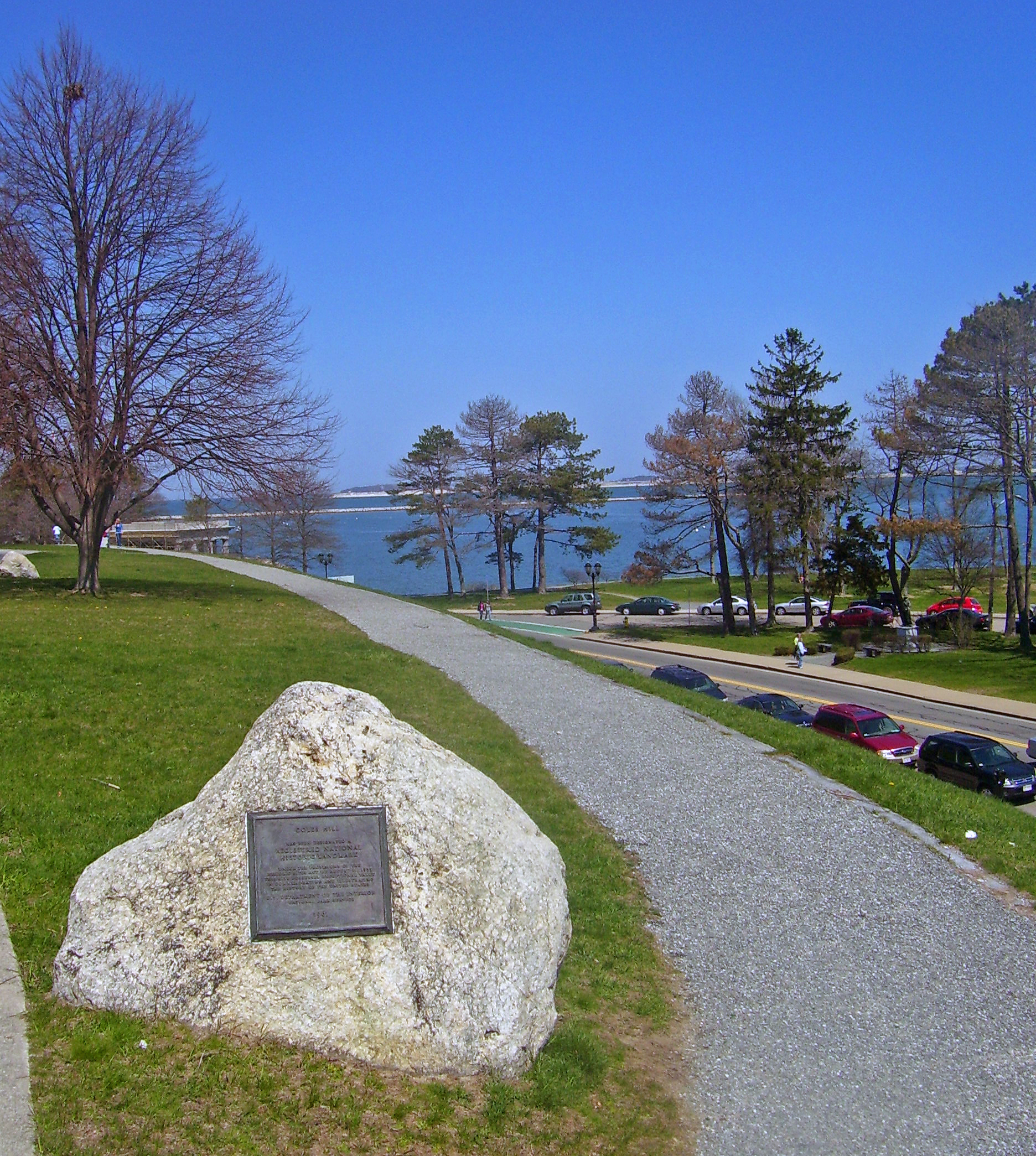
- NHL plaque on Cole's Hill with Plymouth Bay in background, 2008

- Location within Massachusetts Location within the United States
- Location: Carver Street, Plymouth, Massachusetts
- Coordinates: 41°57′27″N 70°39′46″W
- Built: 1620
- NRHP reference No.: 66000142

Significant dates
- Added to NRHP: October 15, 1966
- Designated NHL: October 9, 1960

Cole's Hill is a National Historic Landmark containing the first cemetery used by the Mayflower Pilgrims in Plymouth, Massachusetts in 1620. The hill is located on Carver Street near the foot of Leyden Street and across the street from Plymouth Rock. Owned since 1820 by the preservationist Pilgrim Society, it is now a public park.

== Description ==
Cole's Hill rises steeply from the shore of Plymouth Bay, near Plymouth Rock, the traditional landing site of the Pilgrims in 1620. It is now bounded by Water, North, Carver, and Leyden Streets. The hill is landscaped with grassy areas, low shrubs, and some trees, and trails wind their way around the hill. A granite staircase rises from Water Street to the summit of the hill. A number of monuments and memorials are on the hill, most of which date to the tercentenary (300-year anniversary) celebration of the Pilgrim landing in 1920. These include a Cyrus Dallin statue of the Wampanoag sachem Massasoit (c. 1581–1661), whose support was critical to the Pilgrims' survival. At the southern end of the hill stands a granite sarcophagus erected by the General Society of Mayflower Descendants in 1920. It contains skeletal remains accidentally disinterred from the hill in the 18th and 19th centuries, which are believed to be those of Mayflower settlers buried here in the winter of 1620-21 when 52 out of 102 died. Two stone benches, one placed by the Pennsylvania Society of New England Women, the other by the Society of the Daughters of Colonial Wars, face seaward.

== History ==
The Pilgrims built their first houses on Leyden Street rising from the side of Cole's Hill to Burial Hill, and the hill was used in 1620–1621 as a burial ground during their first winter in New England. It is not known whether Cole's Hill was used again as a burying ground between that winter and 1637 when the main town cemetery was established at what is now called Burial Hill. Among those whose remains may have been interred on Cole's Hill are John Carver, Elizabeth Winslow, Mrs. Mary Allerton, Rose Standish, Christopher Martin, Solomon Powers, William Mullins, William White, Degory Priest, Richard Britteridge, John and Edward Tilley and Thomas Rogers. The total number of burials may have been between 45 and 50.

Cole's Hill was later deeded to Samuel Fuller (c. 1580–1633), a church deacon and the colony's physician. It afterward became the property of James Cole, who arrived in 1633 and kept a tavern on the hill in the 1640s. It is from him that the hill's name derives: "Cole's Hill" first appears in town records in 1698. Older oral tradition, however, maintained that the first burying ground of the Pilgrims was here. The hill soon lost its identity as a cemetery. Its commanding view of Plymouth Harbor made it a natural site for defensive works. In 1742, the General Court of Plymouth granted a sum of money to the town to erect a battery here. In 1775, the old defense having gone to seed, a new one was built and manned and continued to be kept up during the Revolutionary War. In 1814 still another fort was thrown up here and its commander was placed in charge of companies of soldiers who were billeted in the town.

In the 18th and 19th centuries, various remains were uncovered at Cole's Hill and attributed to the victims of the winter of 1620–21. This seemed to substantiate the earlier oral tradition. Between 1735 and 1883, the remains of at least 11 people were recovered. A summary of these was provided by John A. Goodwin:

In a storm of 1735 a torrent pouring down Middle Street made a ravine in Cole's Hill and washed many human remains down into the harbor. In 1809 a skull with especially fine teeth was exposed. In 1855 these graves were exposed in laying the public conduit on Cole's Hill. In one grave lay two skeletons, pronounced by surgeons male and female. The man had a particularly noble forehead; and it was fondly surmised that here were the remains of Mr. and Mrs. Carver. These found a new grave on Burial Hill; but the other relics, with barbaric taste, were placed in the top of the stone canopy over Forefathers' Rock. In 1879, during some work on the southeast side of the hill, many more bones were unearthed, and some, with questionable taste, were carried away by the spectators in remembrance of their "renowned sires"...

The fact that some of the skeletons were laid out on an east–west axis with heads to the west—a long-standing tradition with Christian burials—is taken as evidence that these were not Wampanoag Indian remains. Additionally, the fact that no personal items were buried with the bodies further suggests that they were European burials. (Photographs of some of the bones, circa 1920, are on display at the nearby Pilgrim Hall Museum). Meanwhile, Cole's Hill had been acquired by the recently founded Pilgrim Society in 1820. There was once a granite slab on the hill at the foot of Middle Street, describing the discovery of the bones and the location where they had been found. (This slab is now stored at the Town Farm.) An inscription stated:

On this hill The Pilgrims who died the first winter were buried. This tablet marks the spot where lies the body of one found Oct. 8, 1883. The body of another found on the 27th of the following month lies 8 feet northwest of the westerly corner of this stone. Erected 1884"

About 1920, the layout of Carver Street at the foot of Middle Street was moved somewhat to the west, which necessitated the purchase and removal of buildings. This was done to permit the erection of the present sarcophagus on the place where some bones had been found, as nearly as it could be determined. At this time the hill was transformed into a public park as part of the preparations for the tercentenary celebration. The existing buildings having been removed from the hill, paths and plantings were added.

Cole's Hill was declared a National Historic Landmark in 1960, and was listed on the National Register of Historic Places in 1966.

== Gallery ==
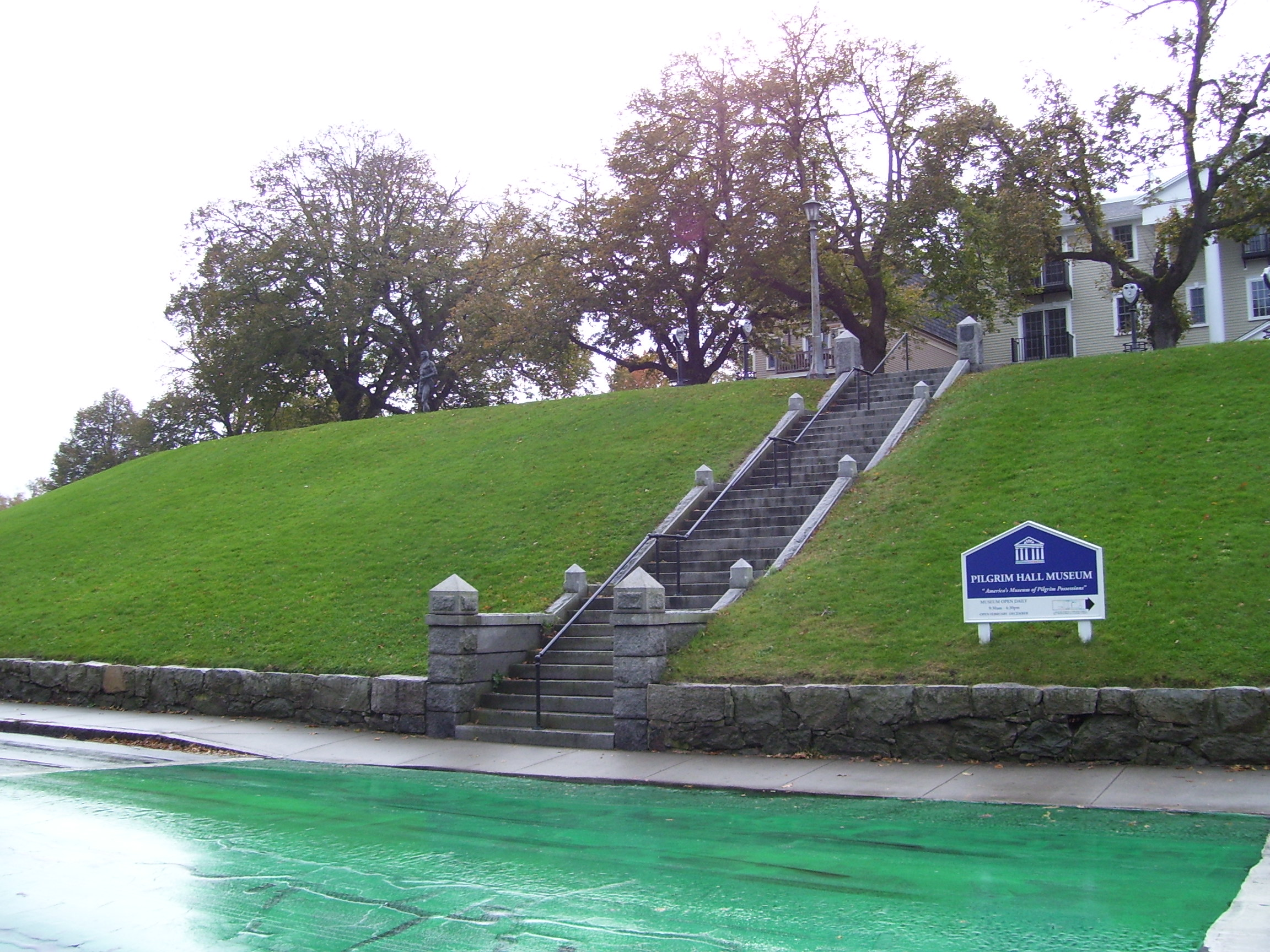
Cole's Hill from near Plymouth Rock

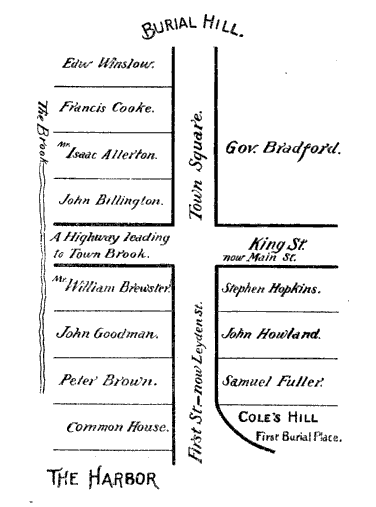
Map of early Plymouth home lots

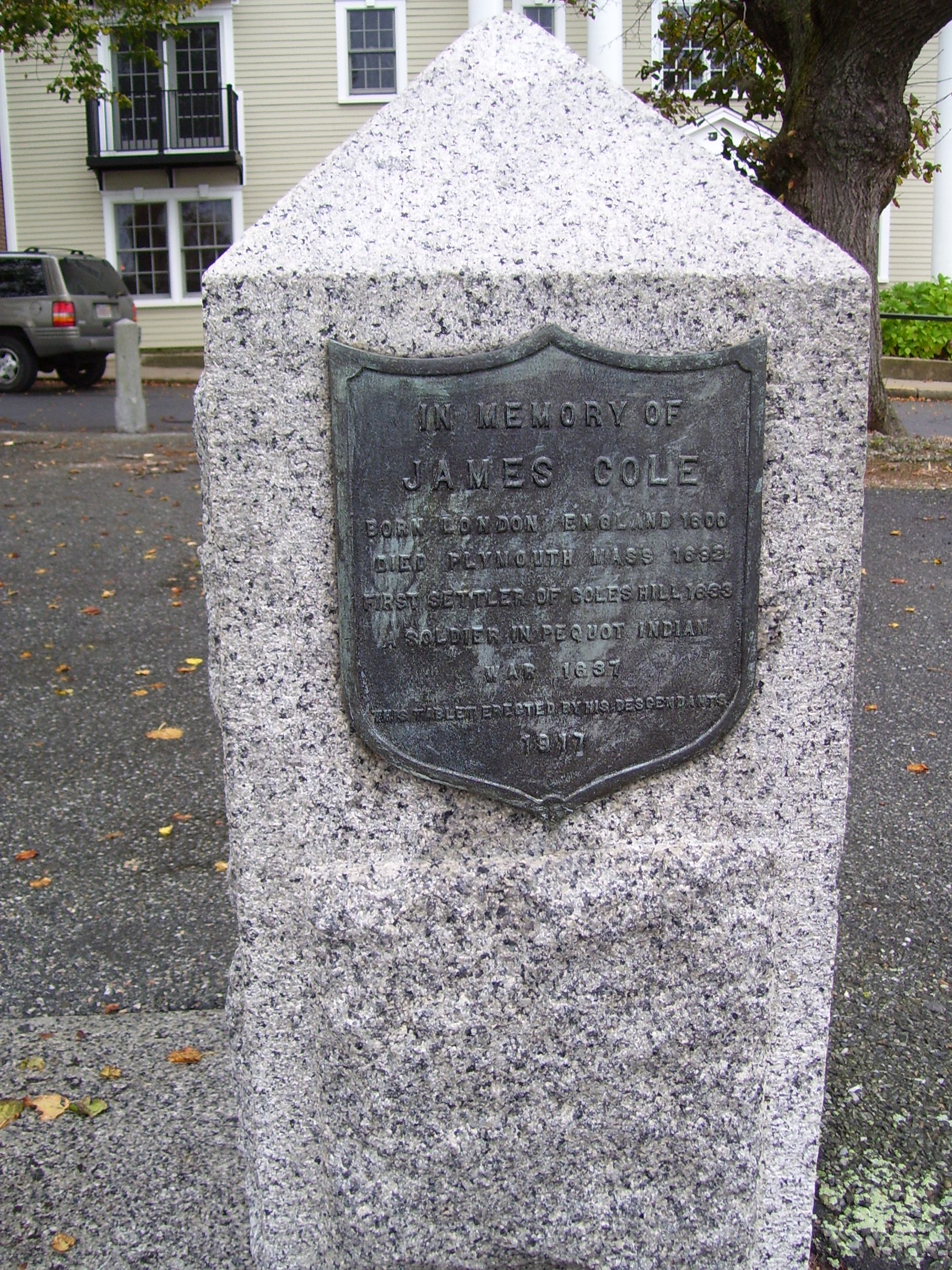
Cole's Hill marker, in memory of James Cole (1600–92), first settler of Cole's Hill

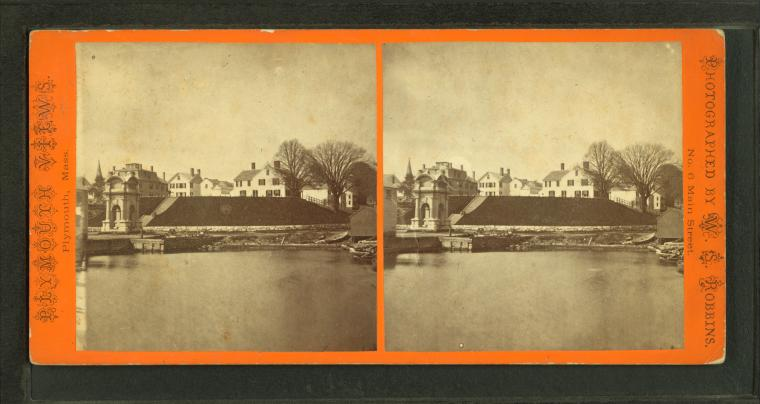
Stereoscopic view of Cole's Hill in late 1800s with the Plymouth Rock canopy to the left

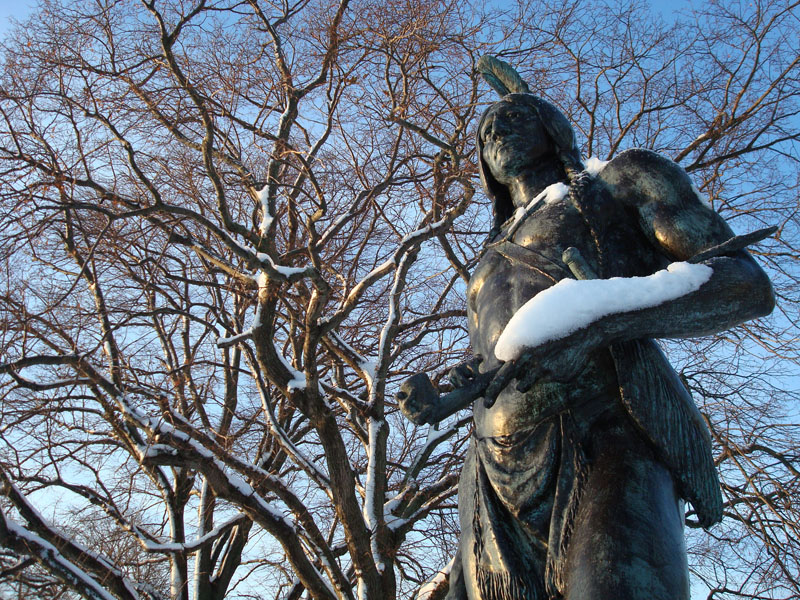
Massasoit statue (1920), by Cyrus Dallin, at the top of Cole's Hill

== See also ==
- Funerary art in Puritan New England
- Myles Standish Burial Ground
- List of National Historic Landmarks in Massachusetts
- National Register of Historic Places listings in Plymouth County, Massachusetts
