= Charles Fuller (disambiguation) =

Charles Fuller (1939–2022) was an American playwright and writer.

Charles Fuller may also refer to:

- Charles Fuller (footballer) (1919–2004), English footballer
- Charles E. Fuller (Baptist minister) (1887–1968), American Christian clergyman and radio evangelist
- Charles E. Fuller (New York politician) (1847–1925), New York farmer and politician
- Charles Eugene Fuller (1849–1926), U.S. Representative from Illinois
- Charles H. Fuller (1859–1938), American politician
- Charley Fuller (1939–2001), American football player

== See also ==
- William Charles Fuller (1884–1974), Welsh recipient of the Victoria Cross
- Charles Fuller Baker (1872–1927), American entomologist, botanist, agronomist and collector
