= Joseph H. Brownell =

American politician (1854–1925)

Member of the New York State Assembly from the Broome County, 1st district
- In office 1896–1896
- Preceded by: district created
- Succeeded by: Charles E. Fuller

Member of the New York State Assembly from the Broome County district
- In office 1894–1895
- Preceded by: Israel T. Deyo
- Succeeded by: district abolished

Personal details
- Born: April 21, 1854 Windsor, New York, U.S.
- Died: March 6, 1925 (aged 70) Susquehanna River
- Resting place: Riverside Cemetery; Windsor, New York, U.S.
- Party: Republican
- Spouse: Minnie L. Brush (m. 1881)
- Education: Cortland Normal School
- Occupation: Politician; farmer; lumberman

Joseph H. Brownell (April 21, 1854 – March 6, 1925) was an American lumberman, farmer, and politician from New York.

== Life ==
Brownell was born on April 21, 1854, in Windsor, New York, the son of farmer Bennett Brownell and Mary Ann Brownell.

Brownell grew up on his family farm. He attended school at the local district schools, Binghamton High School, the Windsor Academy, and the Cortland Normal School. He graduated from the latter school in 1877. He then returned to Windsor, where he was involved in the lumber trade and managed his farm. He owned around 310 acres of land and originally resided in the Brownell homestead. In 1892, he moved to the village of Windsor and developed an extensive lumber business.

Brownell was town supervisor from 1890 to 1892. In 1893, he was elected to the New York State Assembly as a Republican, representing Broome County. He served in the Assembly in 1894 (when he presented bills to amend the Binghamton charter, make the office of county clerk Broome County a salaried office, create a board of equalization of taxes in the county, authorize the town supervisors to appoint commissioners of equalization, and make appropriations for repairs for a military storehouse in Binghamton), 1895, and 1896. He again served as town supervisor in 1898 and 1899.

Brownell was master and senior deacon of the local Freemason lodge and a member of the Knights Templar and the Improved Order of Red Men. He attended the Episcopal Church. In 1881, he married Minnie L. Brush of Great Bend, Pennsylvania.

Brownell killed himself by drowning in the Susquehanna River on March 6, 1925. His body was found a month later, on April 9, in the river near Susquehanna, Pennsylvania. He was buried in Riverside Cemetery at Windsor.

New York State Assembly
Preceded by Israel T. Deyo	New York State Assembly; Broome County; 1894–1895	Succeeded by District Abolished
Preceded by District Created	New York State Assembly; Broome County, 1st District; 1896	Succeeded by Charles E. Fuller
