= Burial Hill =

Historic cemetery in Plymouth County, Massachusetts

- U.S. National Register of Historic Places
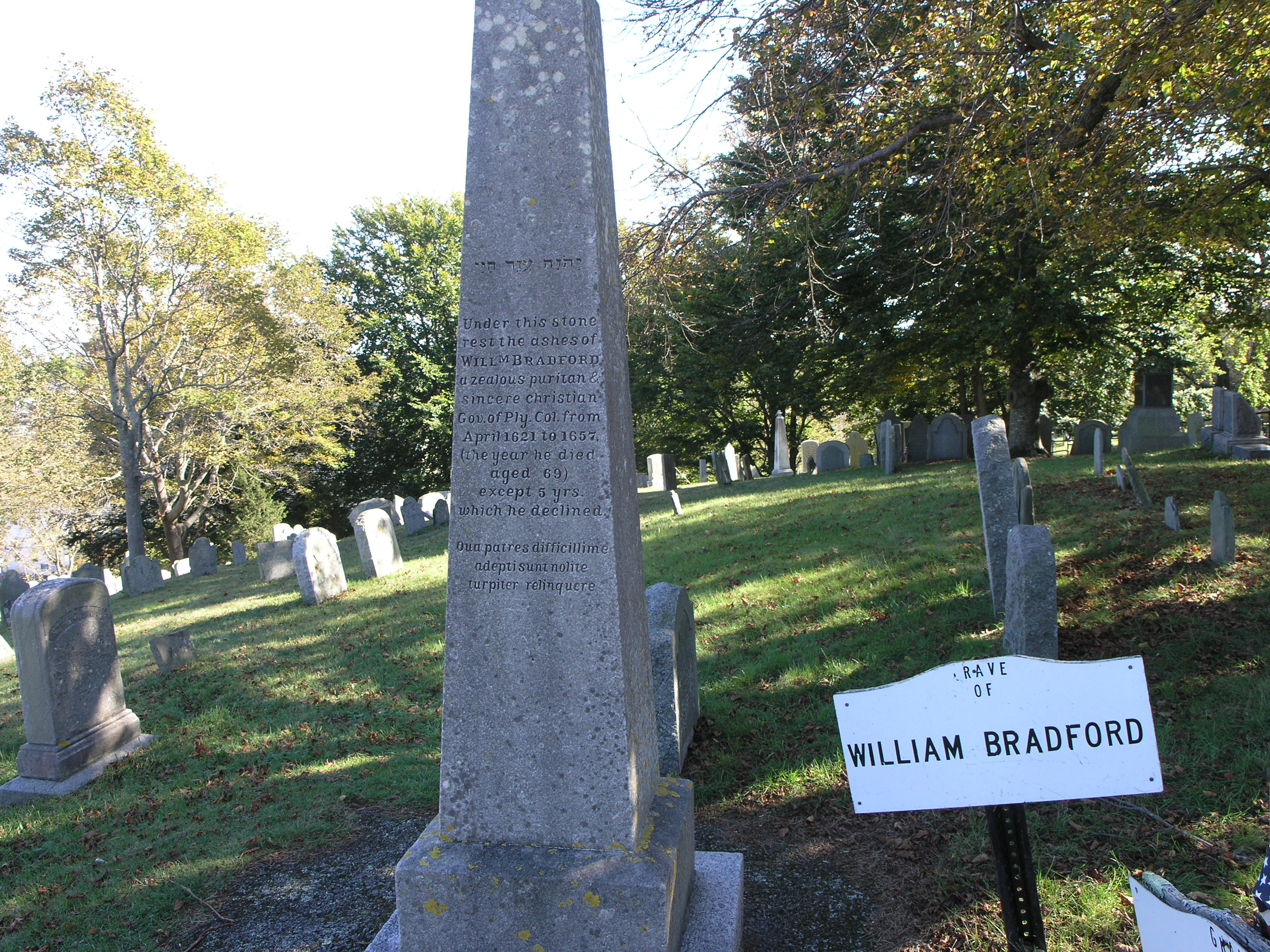
- William Bradford's monument

- Location within Massachusetts Location within the United States
- Location: School Street, Plymouth, Massachusetts
- Coordinates: 41°57′22″N 70°39′58″W
- Built: 1620
- NRHP reference No.: 13000582
- Added to NRHP: August 7, 2013

Burial Hill is a historic cemetery or burying ground on School Street in Plymouth, Massachusetts. Established in the 17th century, it is the burial site of several Pilgrims, the founding settlers of Plymouth Colony. It was listed on the National Register of Historic Places in 2013.

== Description ==
Burial Hill is located just west of Plymouth's Main Street, which parallels the shoreline of Plymouth Bay, and is at the southwest end of Leyden Street, which parallels Town Brook to the south, and was the first street laid out when the Plymouth Colony was founded in 1620. The hill rises 165 feet (50 m) above sea level, and provides commanding views over the surrounding landscape and coastline. The main entrance to the cemetery is just north of the First Parish Church in Plymouth, whose current building is the fifth to stand on the same site. A network of paved footpaths are laid out through the cemetery's 5.1 acres (2.1 ha), with stairs located along steeper sections. There are more than 2,000 marked graves, dating from 1680 to 1957.

== History ==
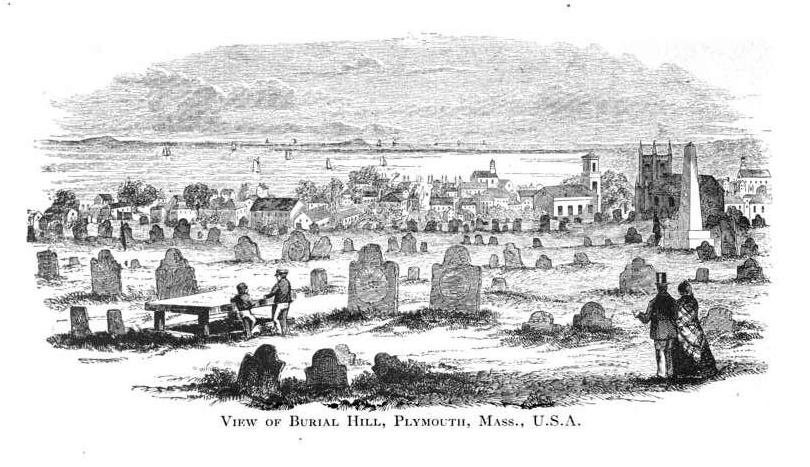
Burial Hill. c. 1890

The first Pilgrim burial ground was on nearby Cole's Hill in 1620-21. Originally, the Pilgrims constructed a fort on top of Burial Hill in 1621-22 (a reconstruction exists in nearby Plimoth Plantation). The Burial Hill fort also served as a meeting house for the colony and for the First Parish Church until 1677. According to tradition, the first grave on Burial Hill was Pilgrim John Howland's. However, he did not die until 1672; other people claimed to be buried there died considerably earlier.

First Parish's congregation currently meets in an 1899 church building at the base of Burial Hill on the town square, near where it first met in 1621.

== Notable burials and cenotaphs ==
- Mary Allerton, Pilgrim, last surviving Mayflower passenger
- William Bradford, Pilgrim, Mayflower passenger, Governor
- William Brewster, church elder
- Thomas Cushman, Ruling Elder of the Plymouth Colony, 1649-1691
- Robert Cushman, organizer of the Mayflower expedition (cenotaph at Cushman Monument)
- Edward Doty, Mayflower passenger
- Francis Cooke, Pilgrim, Mayflower passenger
- John Howland, Pilgrim, Mayflower passenger
- Adoniram Judson, Christian missionary to Asia
- James Magee, captain of the ill-fated privateer General Arnold
- Thomas Prence, Colonial Governor
- Thomas Russell, judge, collector of customs, and ambassador
- Zabdiel Sampson, Congressman
- James Warren, Patriot leader
- Mercy Otis Warren, author
- Richard Warren, Pilgrim, Mayflower passenger

== Image gallery ==
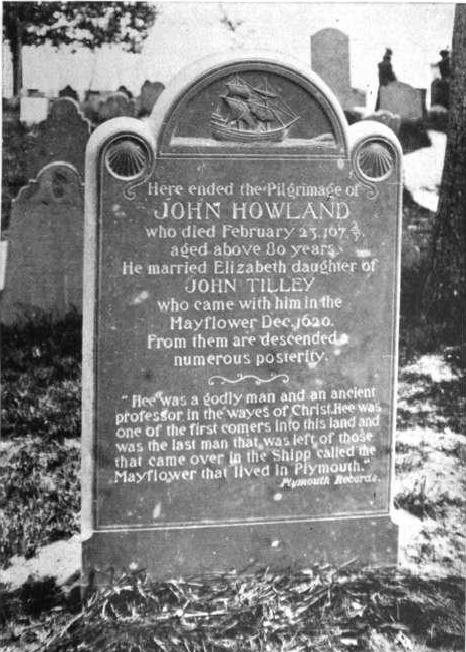
John Howland's grave

Harlow Old Fort House in Plymouth made of timbers from the Burial Hill Fort

Burial Hill Fort, housed the original church in Plymouth

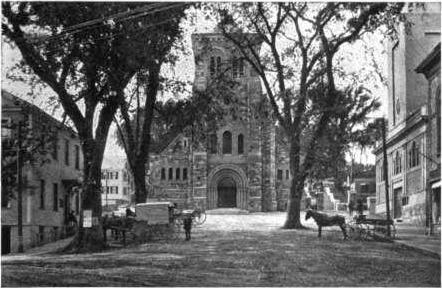
First Parish Church in Plymouth (now Unitarian Universalist) at the base of Burial Hill, is a continuation of the original Pilgrim church

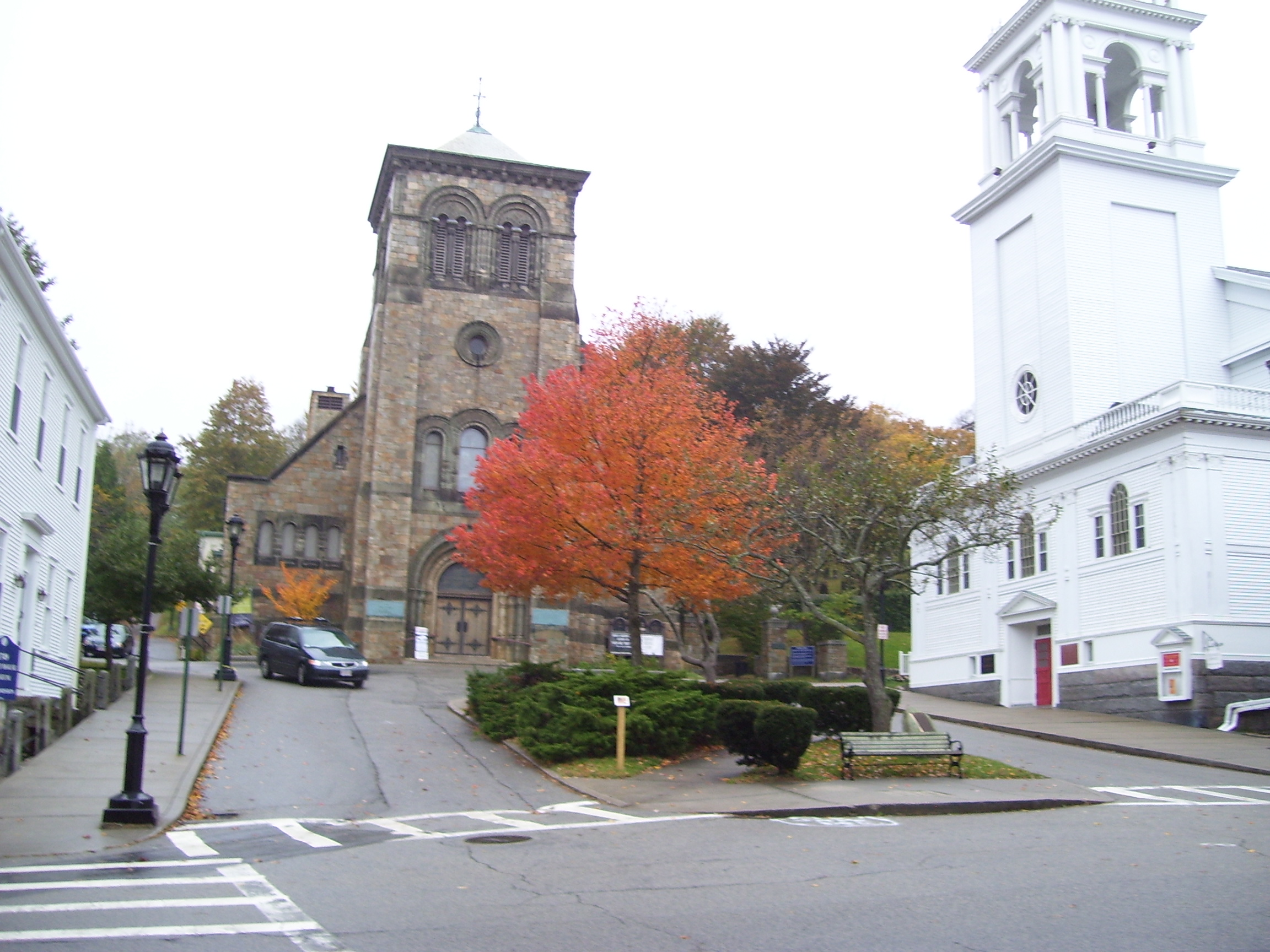
First Parish Church in Plymouth

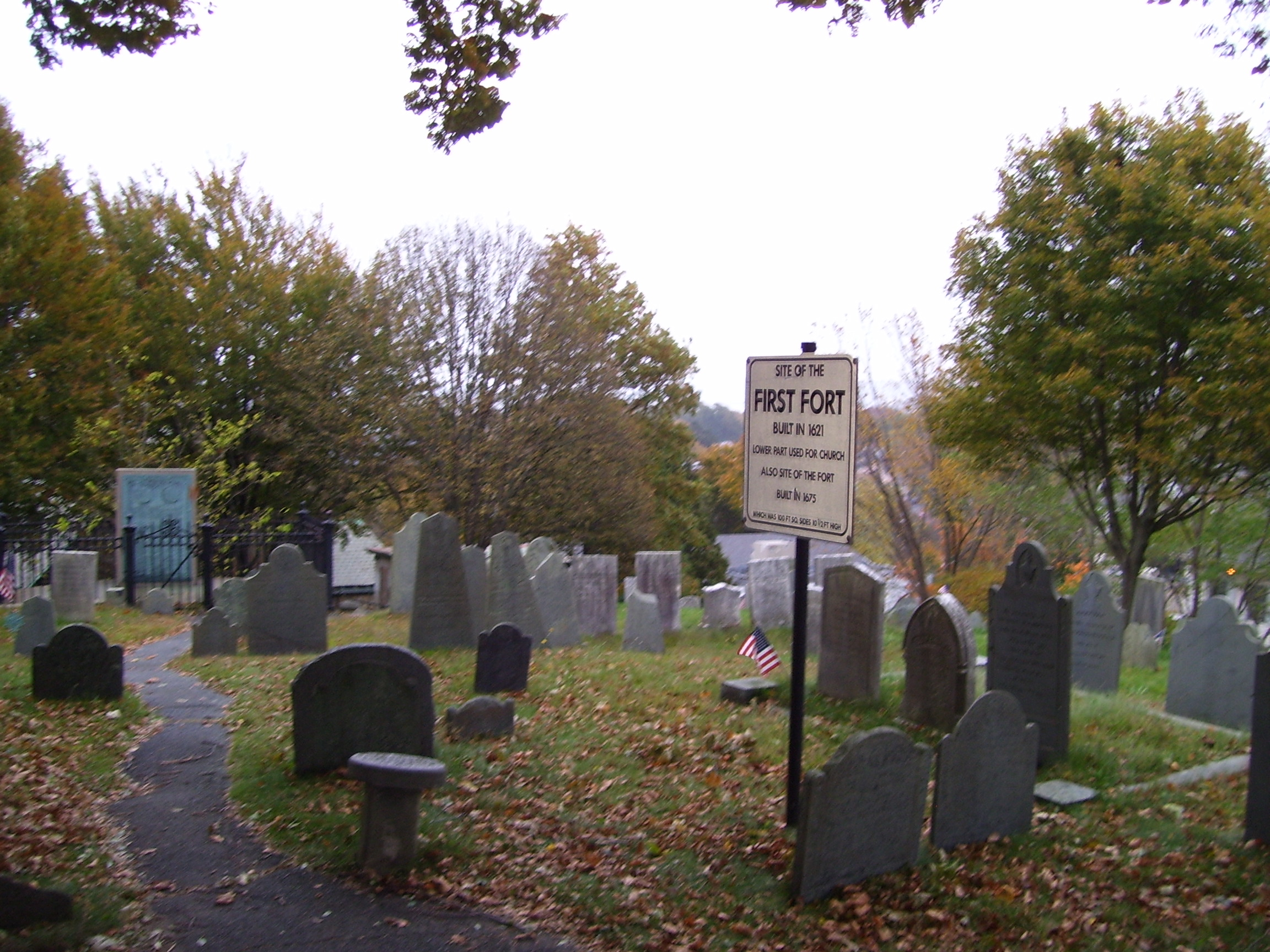
Site of 1621 First Fort and Meeting House on Burial Hill

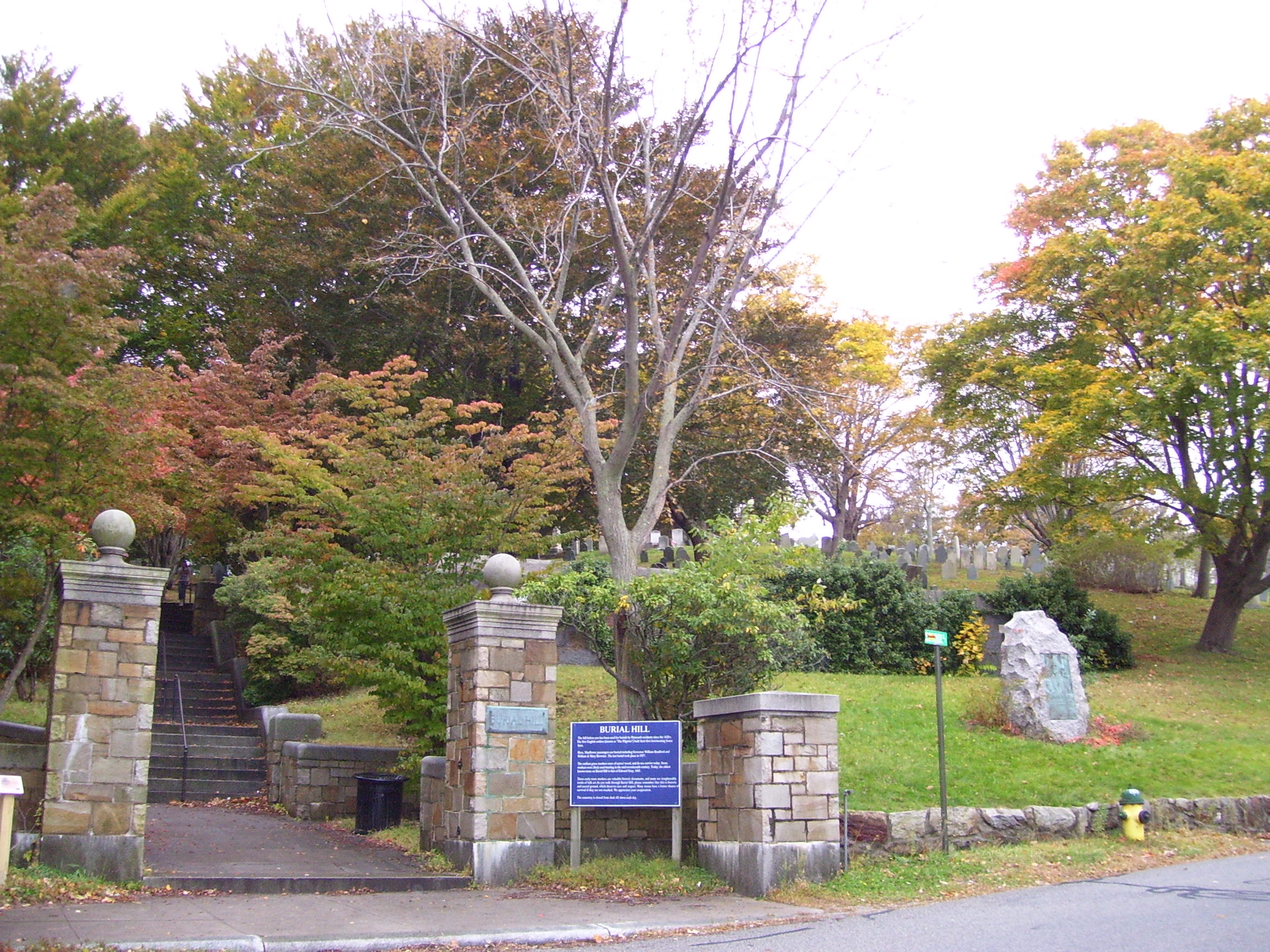
Burial Hill, cemetery entrance

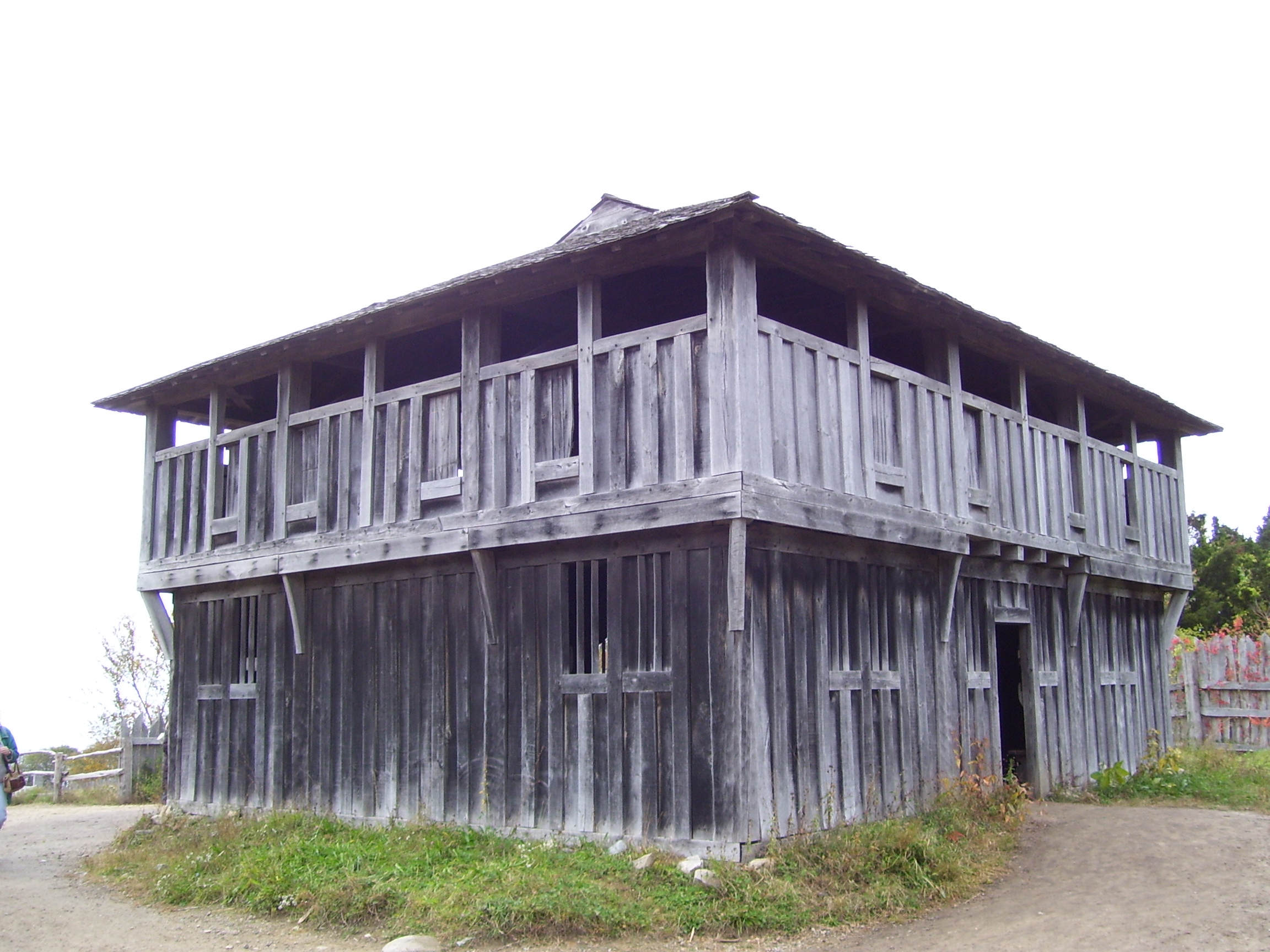
recreation of original Burial Hill fort/meeting house at Plimoth Plantation

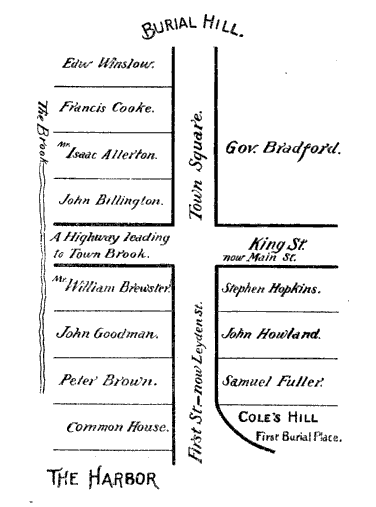
Map of early Plymouth home lots

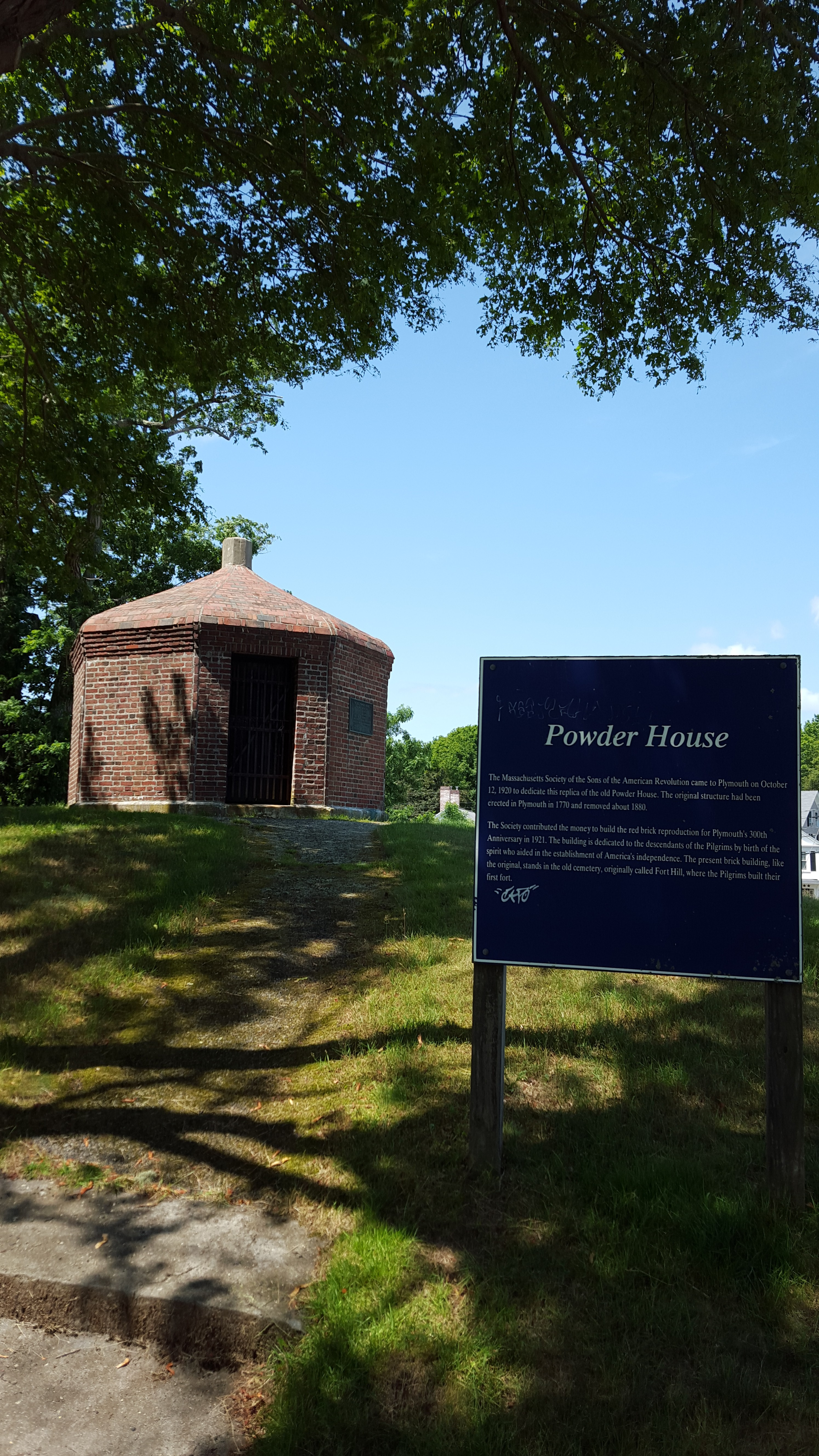
Powder House, 2015

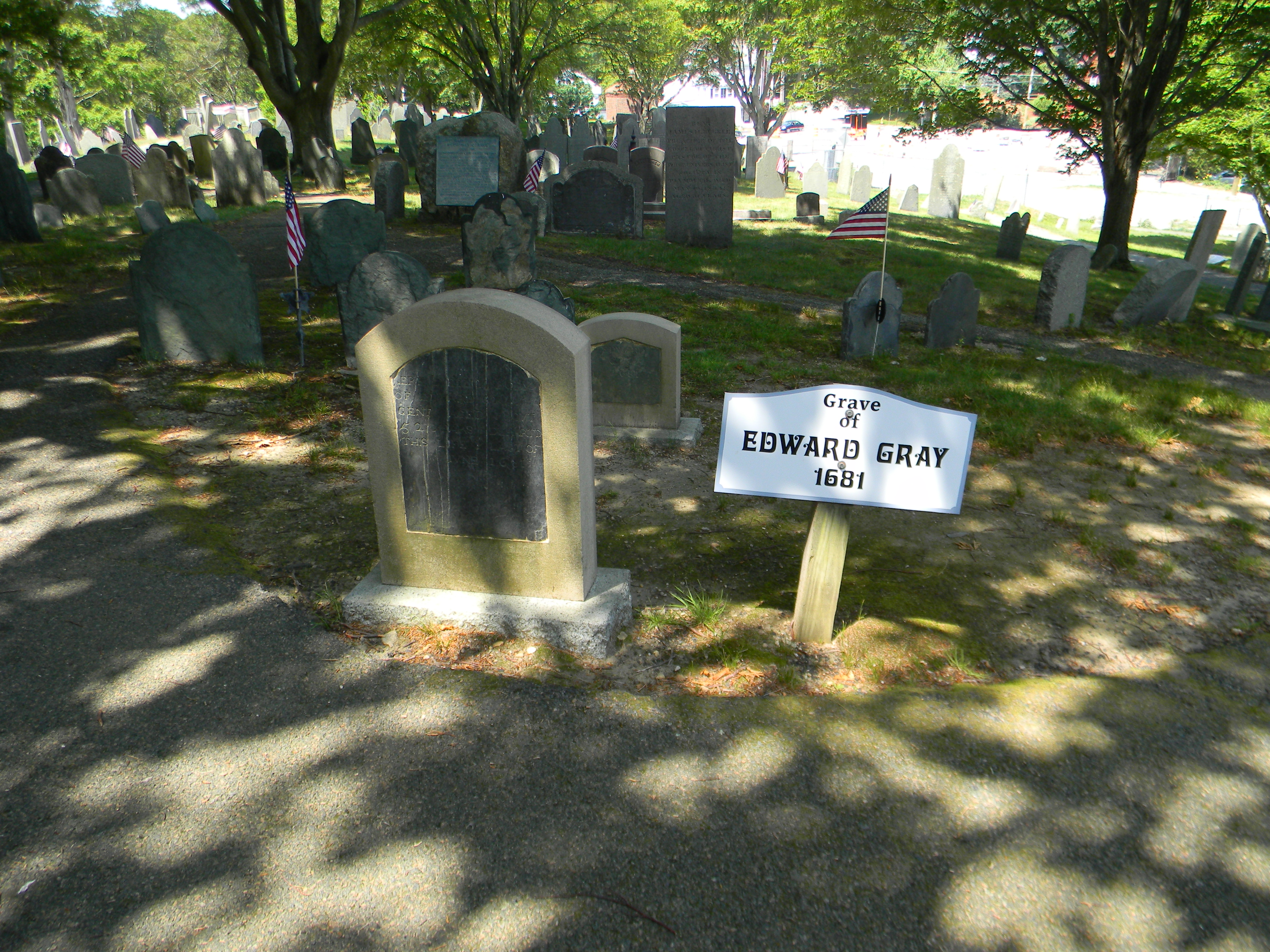
Edward Gray Grave, 2015

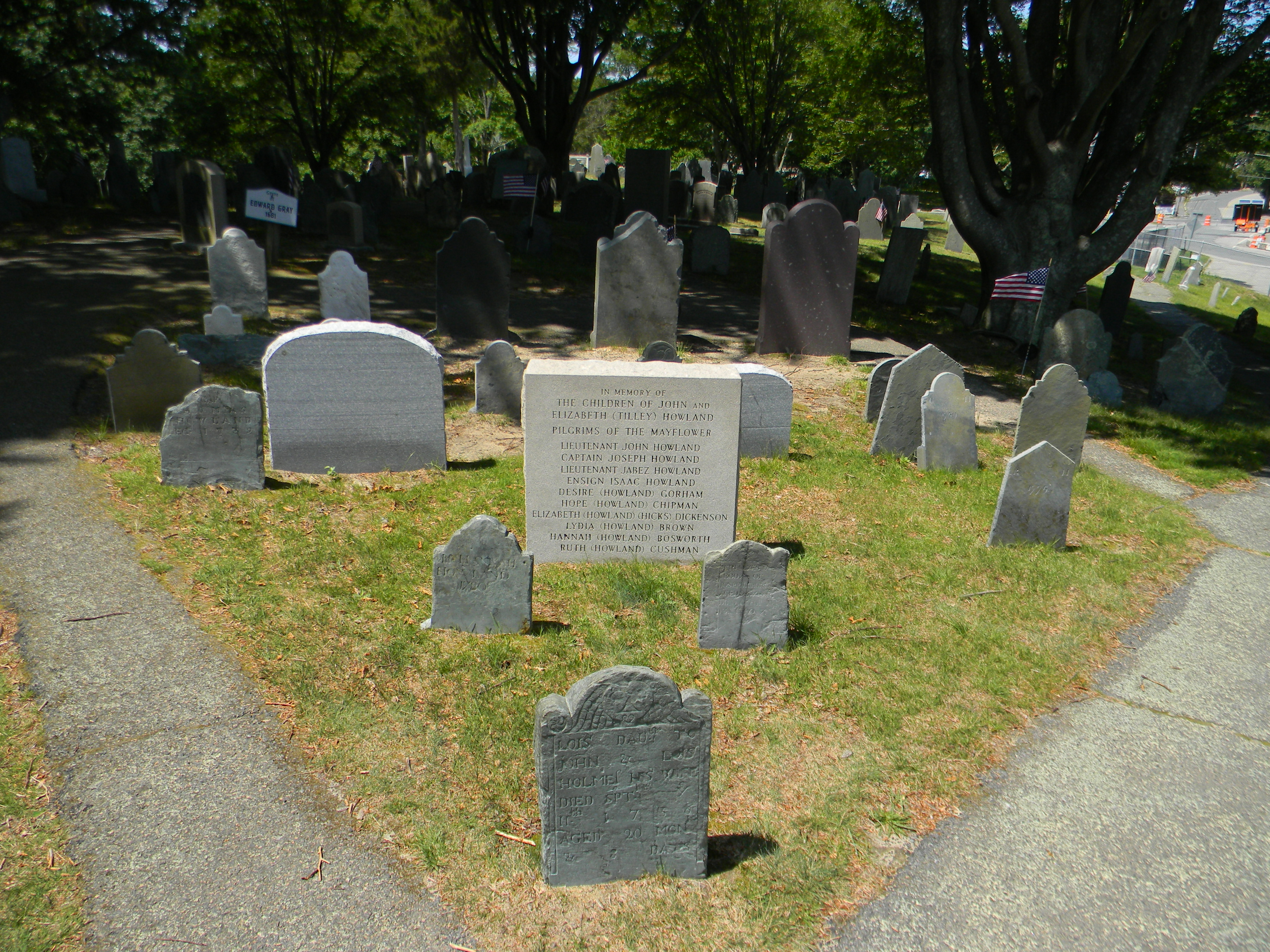
Memorial to the children of John and Elizabeth Howland, 2015

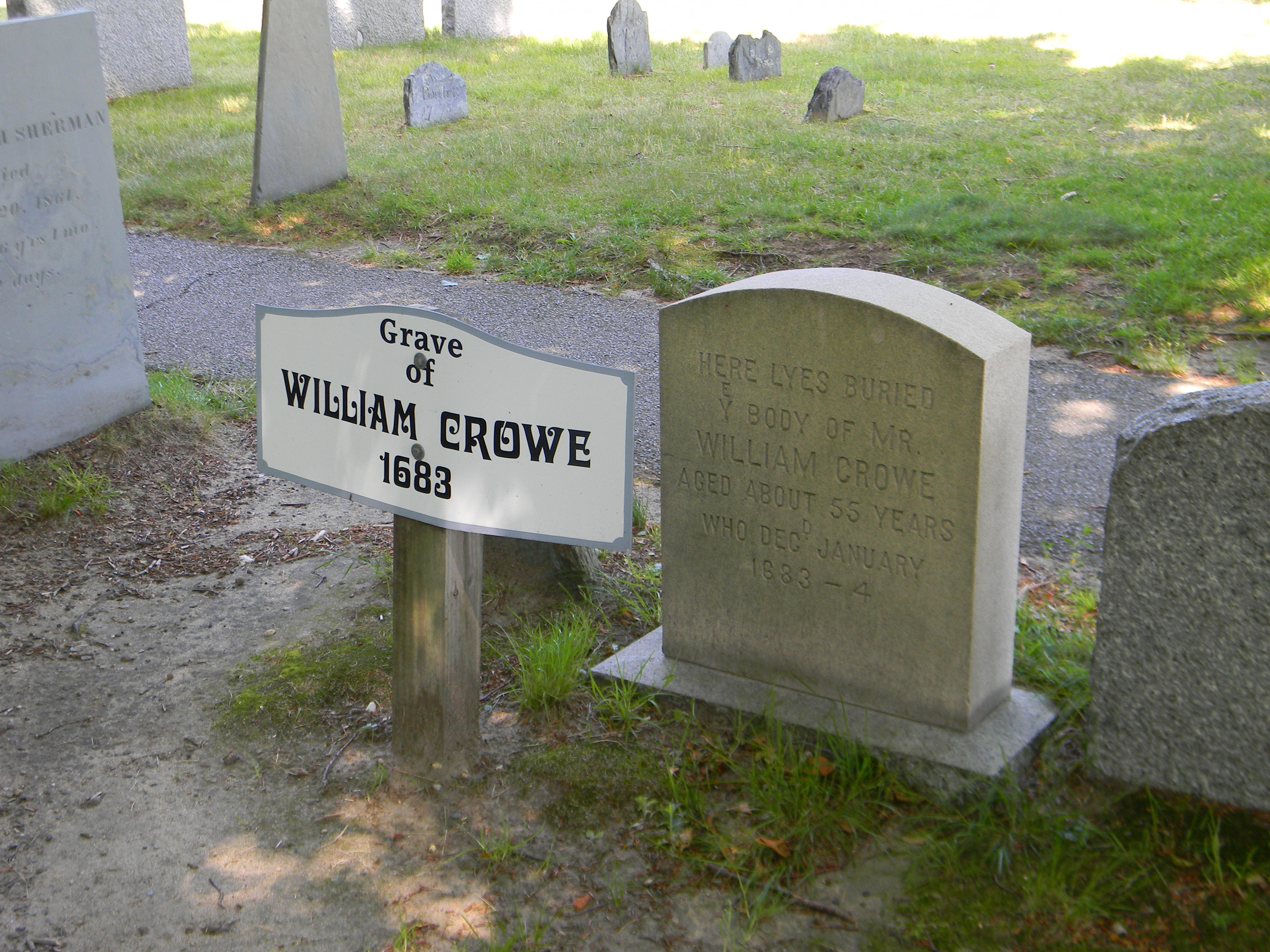
William Crowe Grave, 2015

== See also ==
- Myles Standish Burial Ground
- Cole's Hill
- Plymouth Rock
- National Register of Historic Places listings in Plymouth County, Massachusetts
- Funerary art in Puritan New England
