= First Parish Church in Plymouth =

Historic church in Massachusetts, United States

Coordinates: 41°57′19.9″N 70°39′53.8″W

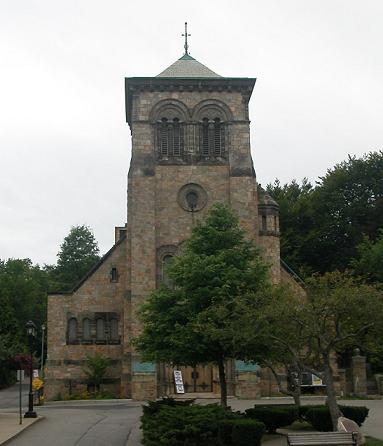
- The current First Parish Church building, built in 1899, in Plymouth is located downtown on Town Square at the base of Burial Hill (on the right)
- First Parish Church in Plymouth
- Location: 12 Church St., Plymouth, Massachusetts
- Country: USA
- Denomination: Unitarian Universalist
- Website: firstparishplymouth.org

History
- Status: Active
- Founded: 1606

Architecture
- Heritage designation: National Register of Historic Places
- Designated: 2014
- Architectural type: Neo-Romanesque
- Years built: 1899

First Parish Church in Plymouth is a historic Unitarian Universalist church at the base of Burial Hill on the town square off Leyden Street in Plymouth, Massachusetts. The congregation was founded in 1620 by the Pilgrims in Plymouth. The current building was constructed in 1899.

== History ==
=== Congregation ===
The congregation was formed in the English village of Scrooby, Nottinghamshire, around 1607 by the Pilgrim Fathers, a group of exiled dissenting Puritans in the Dutch Republic. After they emigrated to America in 1620, the congregation built a chapel in Plymouth which became a parish church of Massachusetts' state church, the Congregational Church. Eventually, a schism developed in 1801, when much of the congregation adopted Unitarianism along with many of the other state churches in Massachusetts; the Congregationalist dissenters broke away to form the Church of the Pilgrimage. All state churches were disaffiliated with the government by 1834. The congregation is currently affiliated with the Unitarian Universalist Association and has 64 members as of 2016.

=== Buildings ===
Originally, the congregation held Christian services on the Mayflower and then at a fort on Burial Hill from 1621 until 1648. The fort was also used for other colony events including meetings of the Plymouth General Court. In 1648 the first of four church buildings on the town square was constructed. Later churches were built in 1684, 1744, and 1831. Hartwell, Richardson & Driver designed the current Romanesque-style building, completed 1899, which replaced the 1831 wooden Gothic structure. The 1899 building was listed on the National Register of Historic Places in 2014. It has Tiffany stained glass windows illustrating the Pilgrim story. The sanctuary features carved quarter-sawn oak and is one of the finest examples of hammer beam construction in the United States.

== Gallery ==
Burial Hill Fort, ca. 1621, housed the original church in Plymouth. From Perkins et al.: Handbook of Old Burial Hill, Plymouth, Massachusetts, Plymouth, Mass., 1902.

William Harlow House, built in 1677 in Plymouth, made of timbers from the Burial Hill Fort, (meeting place of First Parish Church). From Perkins et al.: Handbook of Old Burial Hill, Plymouth, Massachusetts, Plymouth, Mass., 1902.

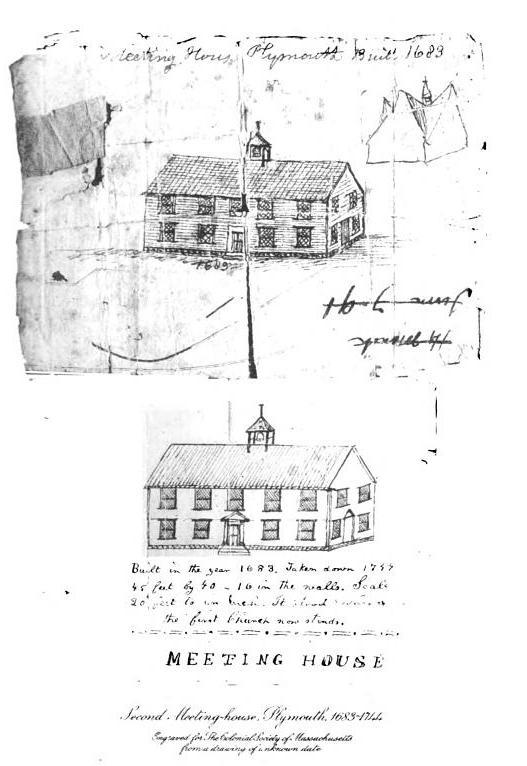
1683 First Parish Meeting House

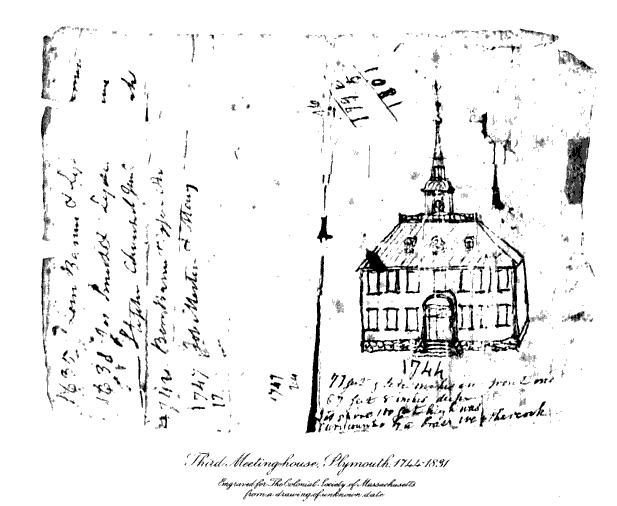
1744 First Parish Meeting House

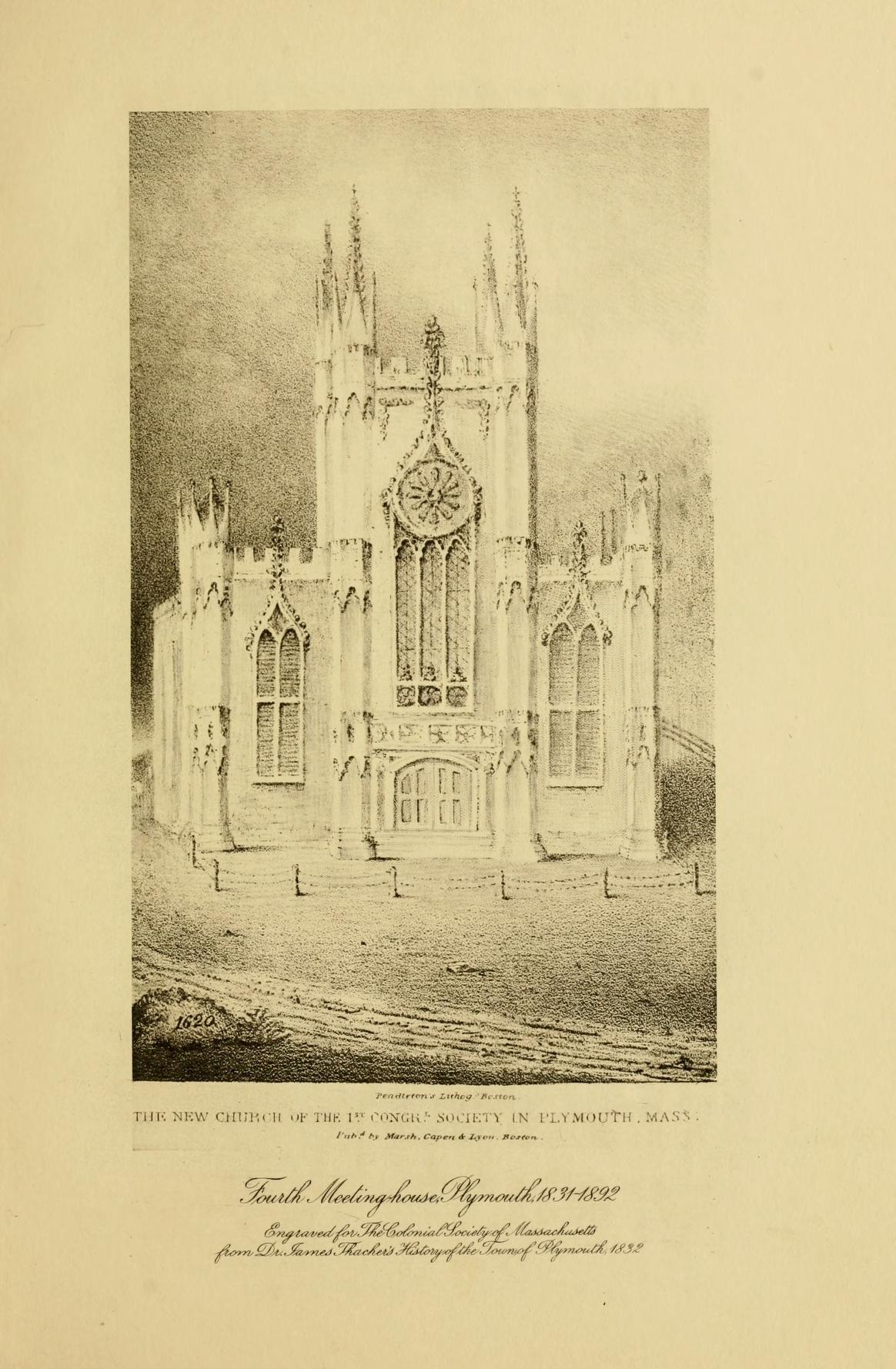
1831 First Parish Meeting House

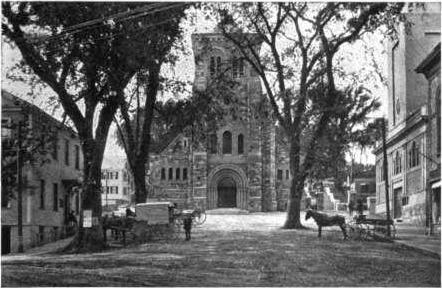
1899 First Parish Meeting House

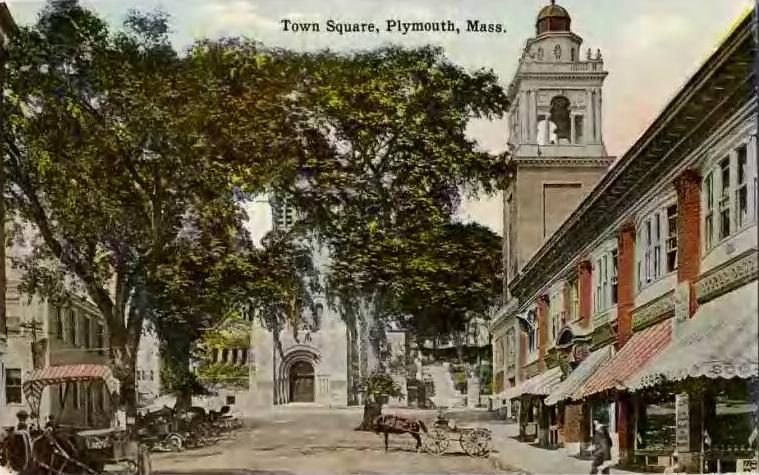
First Parish Church in Town Square, ca. 1905

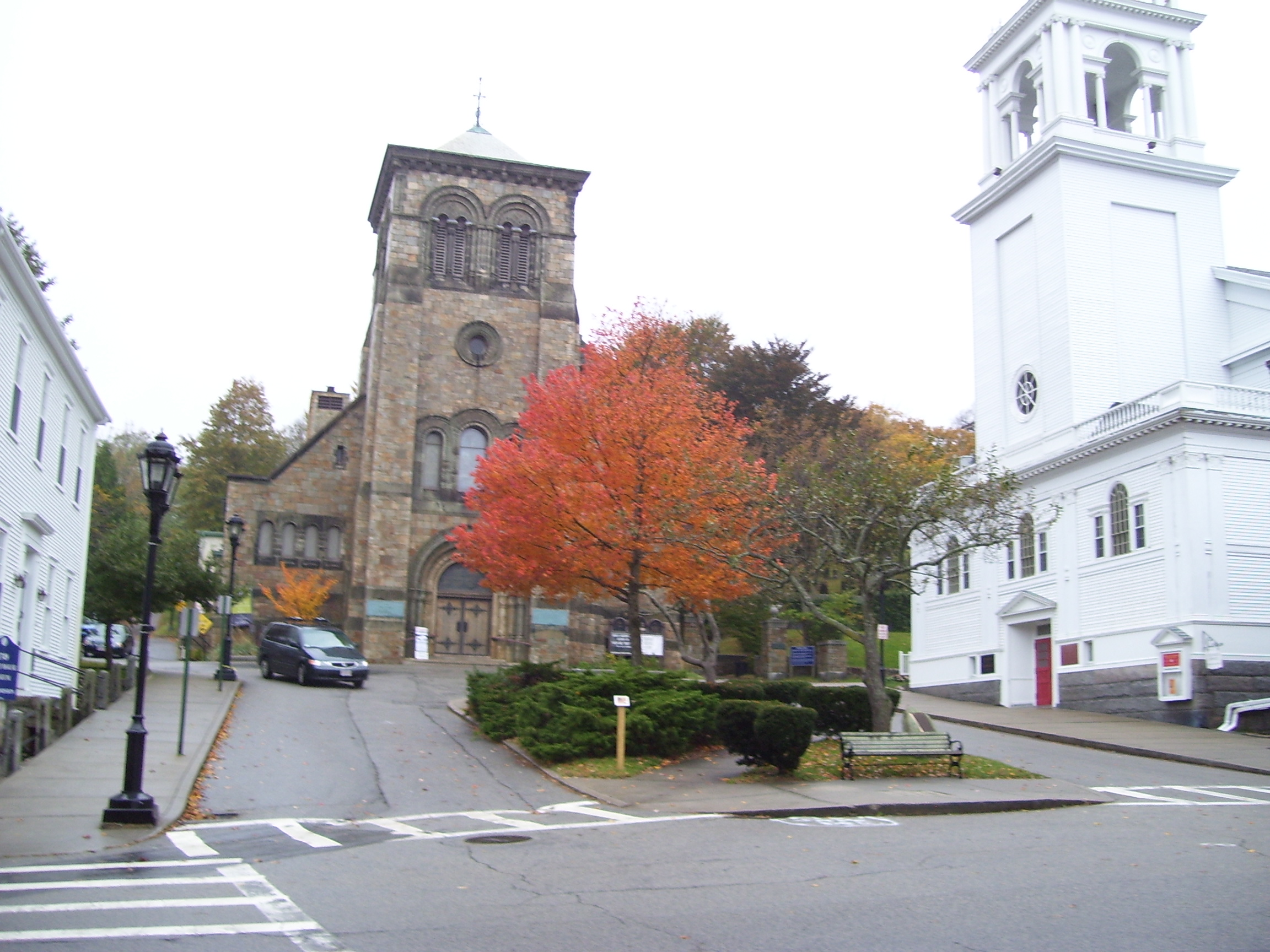
First Parish is at the rear, while the white church to the right is the Church of the Pilgrimage

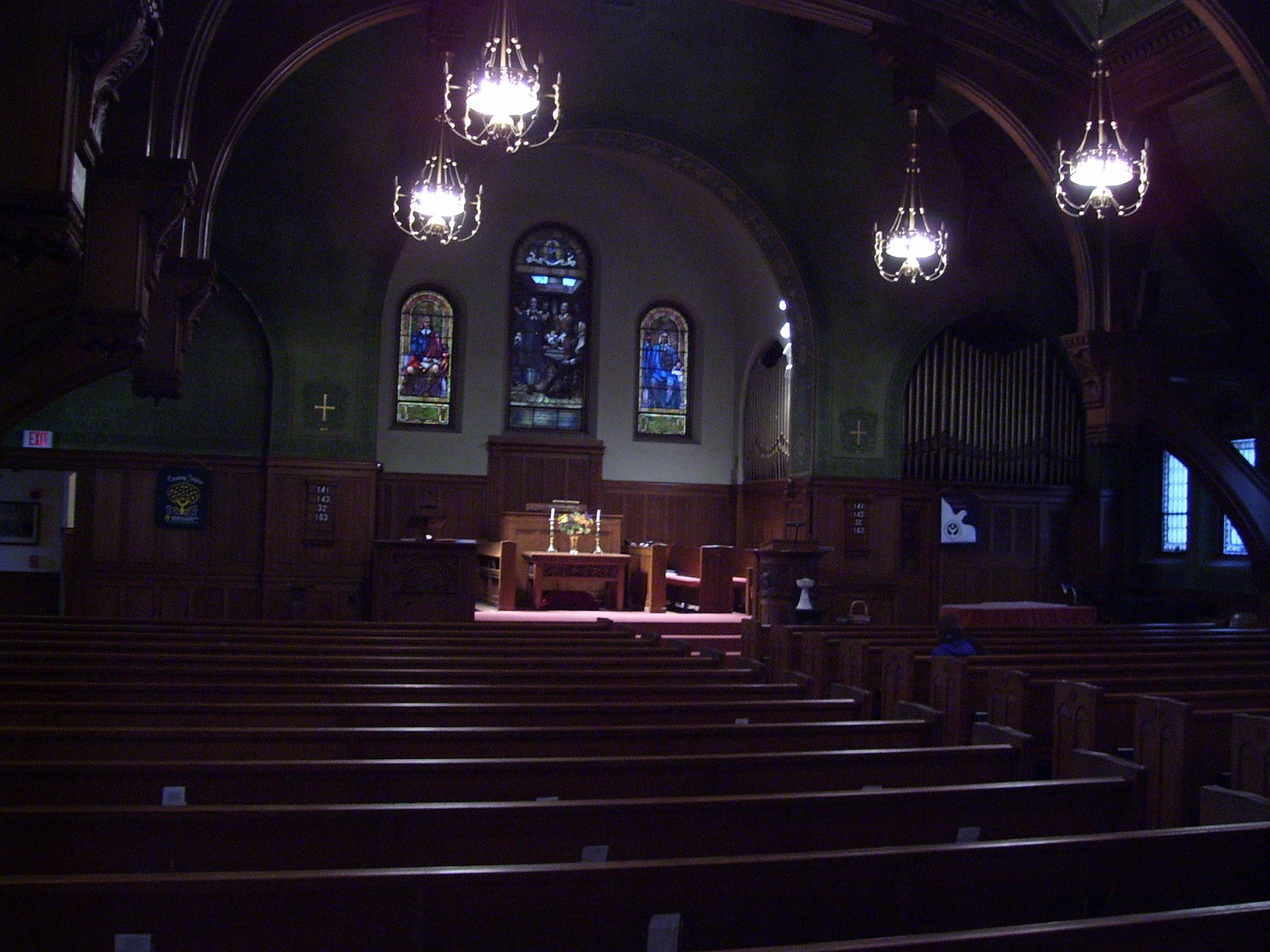
interior

== See also ==
- First Parish Church (Duxbury, Massachusetts)
- Oldest churches in the United States
- National Register of Historic Places listings in Plymouth County, Massachusetts
