= First Parish Church (Duxbury, Massachusetts) =

Historic church in Massachusetts, United States

- U.S. National Register of Historic Places
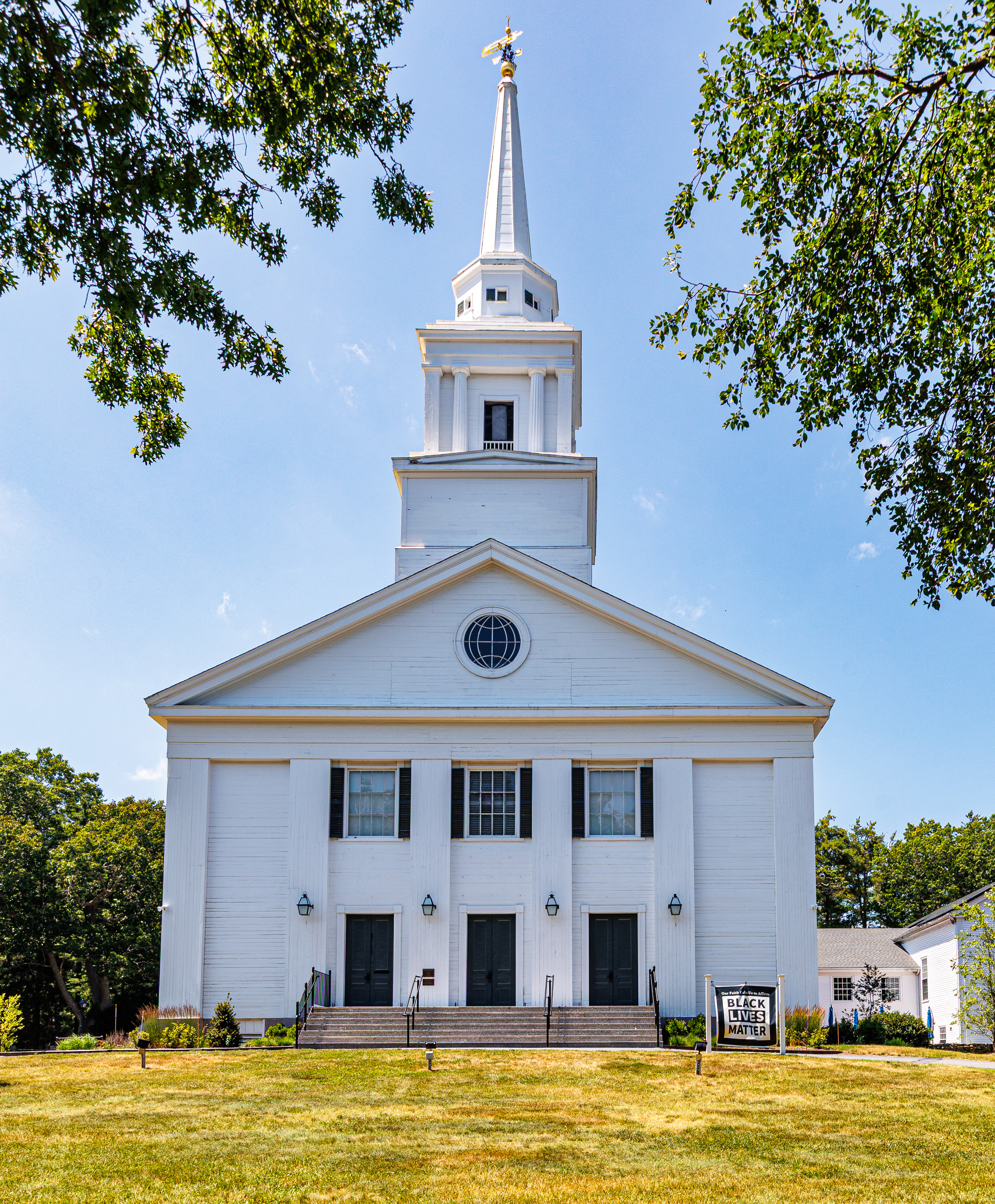

- Location within Massachusetts Location within the United States
- Location: 842 Tremont St., Duxbury, Massachusetts
- Coordinates: 42.0352°N 70.6922°W
- Built: 1840
- Architectural style: Greek Revival
- NRHP reference No.: 78001404
- Added to NRHP: July 21, 1978

The First Parish Church is a historic Unitarian Universalist (formerly Congregationalist) church at Tremont and Depot Streets in Duxbury, Massachusetts. First Parish Church is currently a member congregation of the Unitarian Universalist Association.

== History ==
The original Duxbury congregation was founded in 1632 by Elder William Brewster as a Christian Separatist church with early members coming from the First Parish Church in Plymouth, the oldest church in New England. In the beginning, the church likely met in congregants' homes until the first meeting house was built near what is today known as Miles Standish Burial Ground. The Duxbury congregation became a parish church of Massachusetts' Congregationalist state church. A schism developed at the turn of the 19th century, when much of the congregation adopted Unitarianism along with many of the other state churches in Massachusetts. State churches were officially disaffiliated with the Massachusetts government in 1834. The current church building was constructed in 1840. The building was added to the National Register of Historic Places in 1978.

== Images ==
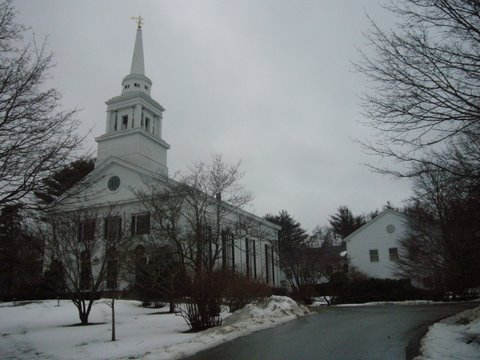
First Parish Church in 2010

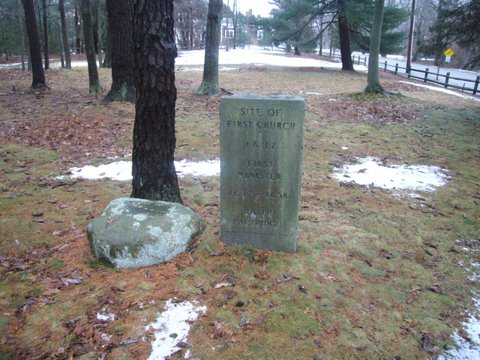
Site of the original First Parish Church meeting house within Myles Standish Burial Ground

== See also ==
- First Parish Church in Plymouth
- National Register of Historic Places listings in Plymouth County, Massachusetts
