= Charles E. Fuller (New York politician) =

American politician (1847–1925)

Member of the New York State Assembly from the Broome County, 1st district
- In office 1897–1898
- Preceded by: Joseph H. Brownell
- Succeeded by: James T. Rogers

Personal details
- Born: Charles Edward Fuller; March 10, 1847 Binghamton, New York, U.S.
- Died: April 28, 1925 (aged 78) Conklin, New York, U.S.
- Resting place: Conklin Cemetery
- Party: Republican
- Spouse: Annie M. Banta (m. 1870)
- Children: 3
- Education: Lowell's Business College
- Occupation: Politician; farmer

Charles Edward Fuller (March 10, 1847 – April 28, 1925) was an American farmer and politician from New York.

== Life ==
Fuller was born on March 10, 1847, in Binghamton, New York, the son of Joseph Fuller and Matilda Luce. He was a descendant of Samuel Fuller, the surgeon of the Mayflower.

Fuller attended common schools, spent three years with a private tutor, and graduated from Lowell's Business College. He taught school for around ten years, briefly worked as a bookkeeper, and by 1897 was a farmer. He was also a trustee, secretary, and treasurer of Conklin Milk and Produce Company. A resident of Conklin, he was an assessor of the town. He also represented the town as town supervisor for ten years, serving as chairman of the board of supervisors in 1890. In 1880, he was appointed school commissioner of the First District to fill a vacancy caused by the resignation of Arthur G. Wilson. He was elected for a three-year term for that office later that year.

In 1896, Fuller was elected to the New York State Assembly as a Republican, representing the Broome County 1st District. He served in the Assembly in 1897 and 1898. While in the Assembly, he helped pass the biannual town meeting bill in 1897, and in 1898 he helped pass the Fuller good road bill (which provided state aid to improve highways or towns that adopt the money system.

Fuller was a ruling elder of the Presbyterian Church of Conklin. He was also a member of the Freemasons and a trustee and secretary of the Conklin Cemetery Association. In 1870, he married Annie M. Banta. Their children were Grace M. and Alice Fennett. They had a son Archie E. who died in 1889 when he was seventeen.

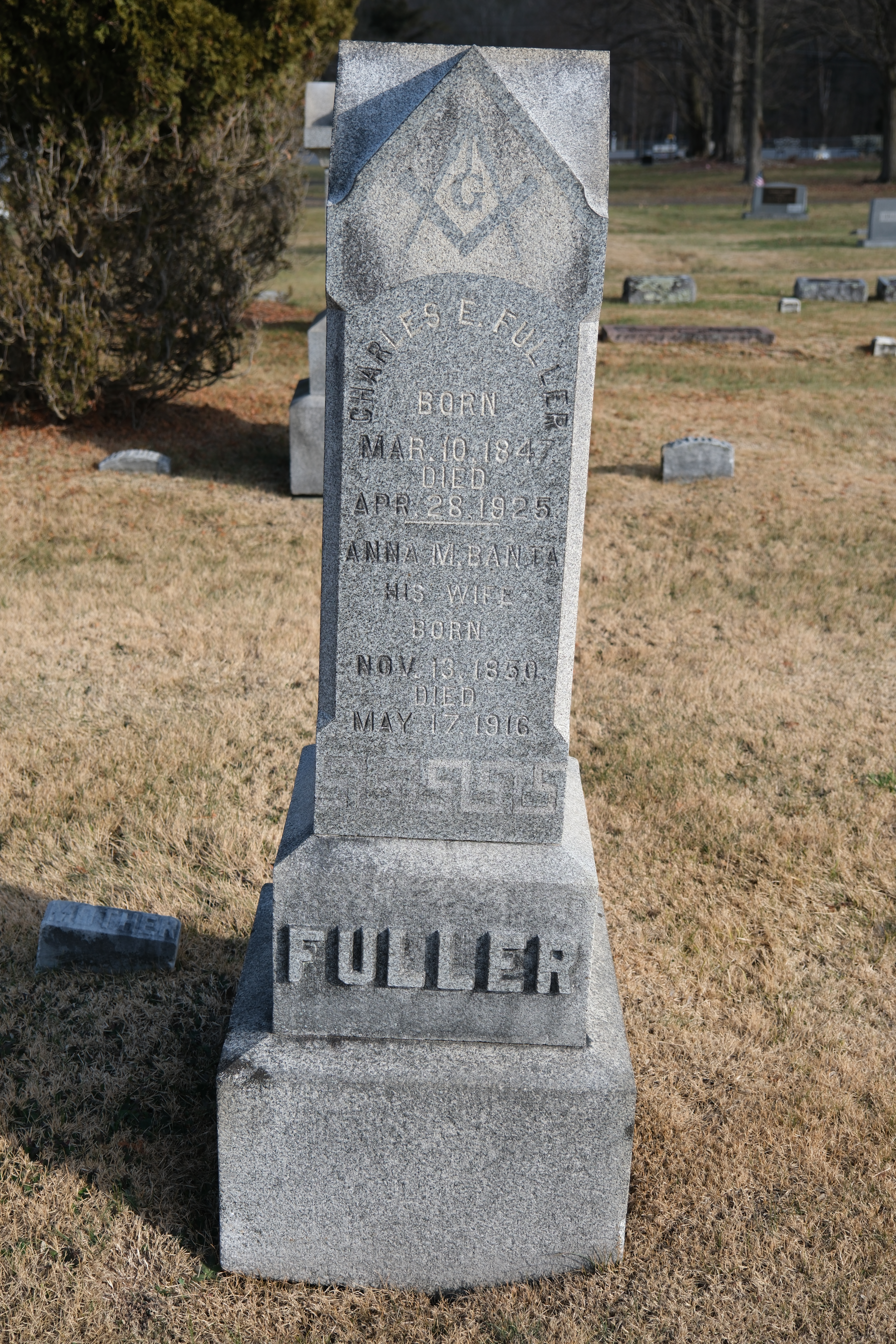
Grave of Fuller in Conklin Cemetery

Fuller died at his home in Conklin on April 28, 1925. He was buried in Conklin Cemetery.

New York State Assembly
Preceded by Joseph H. Brownell	New York State Assembly; Broome County, 1st District; 1897–1898	Succeeded by James T. Rogers
