= Israel T. Deyo =

American lawyer and politician (1854–1953)

Member of the New York State Assembly from the Broome County district
- In office 1890–1893
- Preceded by: Alonzo D. Lewis
- Succeeded by: Joseph H. Brownell

Personal details
- Born: Israel Tripp Deyo; January 28, 1854 Union, New York, U.S.
- Died: October 5, 1953 (aged 99)
- Resting place: Floral Park Cemetery
- Party: Republican
- Spouse(s): Josephine A. Smith (m. 1880; died 1881) Edith A. Weld (m. 1889)
- Children: 3, including Martin W.
- Education: Amherst College (BA)
- Occupation: Politician; educator; lawyer

Israel Tripp Deyo (January 28, 1854 – October 5, 1953) was an American lawyer and politician from New York.

== Life ==
Deyo was born on January 28, 1854, in Union, New York. He was the son of Richard Deyo and Caroline Eckert.

Deyo graduated from Binghamton High School as the class valedictorian in 1875. He then attended Amherst College, graduating with a Bachelor of Arts in 1879. He was a member of both Phi Beta Kappa and Delta Kappa Epsilon. He became principal of Whitney's Point Academy in Whitney Point in 1879 and 1880. Afterwards, he taught English and history at Cortland Normal School (today the State University of New York College at Cortland) in 1881 and 1882.

Deyo read law, and in 1882 studied law under David H. Carver, the District Attorney of Broome County. He was admitted to the bar in 1883, and began practicing law in Binghamton. In 1885 he formed a law practice with Carver. They later started the law firm Carver, Deyo, & Jenkins.

In 1889, Deyo was elected to the New York State Assembly as a Republican, representing Broome County. He served in the Assembly in 1890, 1891, 1892, and 1893.

In 1894, Governor Flower appointed Deyo to serve on a commission to investigate charges made against the management of the Elmira Reformatory. He served as a delegate to the 1915 New York State Constitutional Convention.

After he left the Assembly, Deyo became a member of the law firm Jenkins, Deyo, & Hitchcock. He was a member and former vice-president of the New York State Bar Association and a member of the American Bar Association. He was a director of Binghamton Gas Works and Binghamton Dry Goods Company, secretary-director of the Deyo Oil Company, secretary of Larrabee-Deyo Motor Truck Company, and member of the dairy firm Deyo Brothers. He also was a member of the Board of Trustees for the Cortland Normal School and vice-president of the New York State Agricultural Society. He was a freemason, a companion of the Royal Arch Masonry, a Knight Templar, and a Shriner. In 1887, he became the trustee of the First Congregational Church in Binghamton.

Deyo married Josephine A. Smith in 1880. She died in 1881, less than a year after their marriage. In 1889, he married Edith A. Weld. Their children were Austin, Dorothy, and state senator and New York Supreme Court Justice Martin W. Deyo. One sibling of note was Martin L. Deyo. Martin L. Deyo attended the Brockport Normal School and was a founding member of The Gamma Sigma Society of 1869. Martin L Deyo was a renowned Math Professor at the Albany Academy from 1870 to 1898.

Deyo was still working as a lawyer until the age of 93. He died at home on October 5, 1953. He was buried in Floral Park Cemetery.

New York State Assembly
Preceded by Alonzo D. Lewis	New York State Assembly; Broome County; 1890-1893	Succeeded by Joseph H. Brownell
