= Charles Fuller (footballer) =

English footballer

Personal information
- Full name: Charles Edward Fuller
- Date of birth: 25 May 1919
- Date of death: 16 November 2004 (aged 85)
- Place of death: Medway, England

International career
Years	Team	Apps	(Gls)
1952	Great Britain	1	(0)

Charles Edward Fuller (25 May 1919 – 16 November 2004) was an English footballer who represented Great Britain at the 1952 Summer Olympics.
