= Martin W. Deyo =

American politician (1902–1951)

Member of the New York Senate from the 40th district
- In office 1935–1936
- Preceded by: Bert Lord
- Succeeded by: Roy M. Page

Member of the New York State Assembly from the Broome County, 2nd district
- In office 1933–1934
- Preceded by: Forman E. Whitcomb
- Succeeded by: James E. Hill

Personal details
- Born: Martin Weld Deyo; December 12, 1902 Binghamton, New York, U.S.
- Died: October 20, 1951 (aged 48)
- Resting place: Floral Park Cemetery; Johnson City, New York, U.S.
- Party: Republican
- Parent: Israel T. Deyo (father)
- Education: Amherst College; Columbia Law School
- Occupation: Politician; lawyer

Martin Weld Deyo (December 12, 1902 – October 20, 1951) was an American lawyer and politician from New York.

== Life ==
He was born on December 12, 1902, in Binghamton, Broome County, New York, the son of Assemblyman Israel T. Deyo (1854–1953) and Edith Austin (Weld) Deyo (1863–1944). He attended Binghamton Central High School, and graduated from Amherst College in 1925. In 1928, he married Amy G. Sleeper (1902–1975). He graduated from Columbia Law School, was admitted to the bar in 1931, and practiced in Binghamton.

Deyo was a member of the New York State Assembly (Broome Co., 2nd D.) in 1933 and 1934; and a member of the New York State Senate (40th D.) in 1935 and 1936. In 1935, he introduced a bill in the Legislature to sterilize mentally defective people.

He was a delegate to the New York State Constitutional Convention of 1938.

He was a justice of the New York Supreme Court (6th D.) from 1940 until his death in 1951, and sat on the Appellate Division (3rd Dept.) from 1947 on.

He died on October 20, 1951; and was buried at the Floral Park Cemetery in Johnson City.

== Sources ==
New York State Assembly
Preceded by Forman E. Whitcomb	New York State Assembly; Broome County, 2nd District; 1933–1934	Succeeded by James E. Hill
New York State Senate
Preceded by Bert Lord	New York State Senate; 40th District; 1935–1936	Succeeded by Roy M. Page
