= DuBois-Deyo House =

Historic house in New York, United States

- U.S. National Register of Historic Places
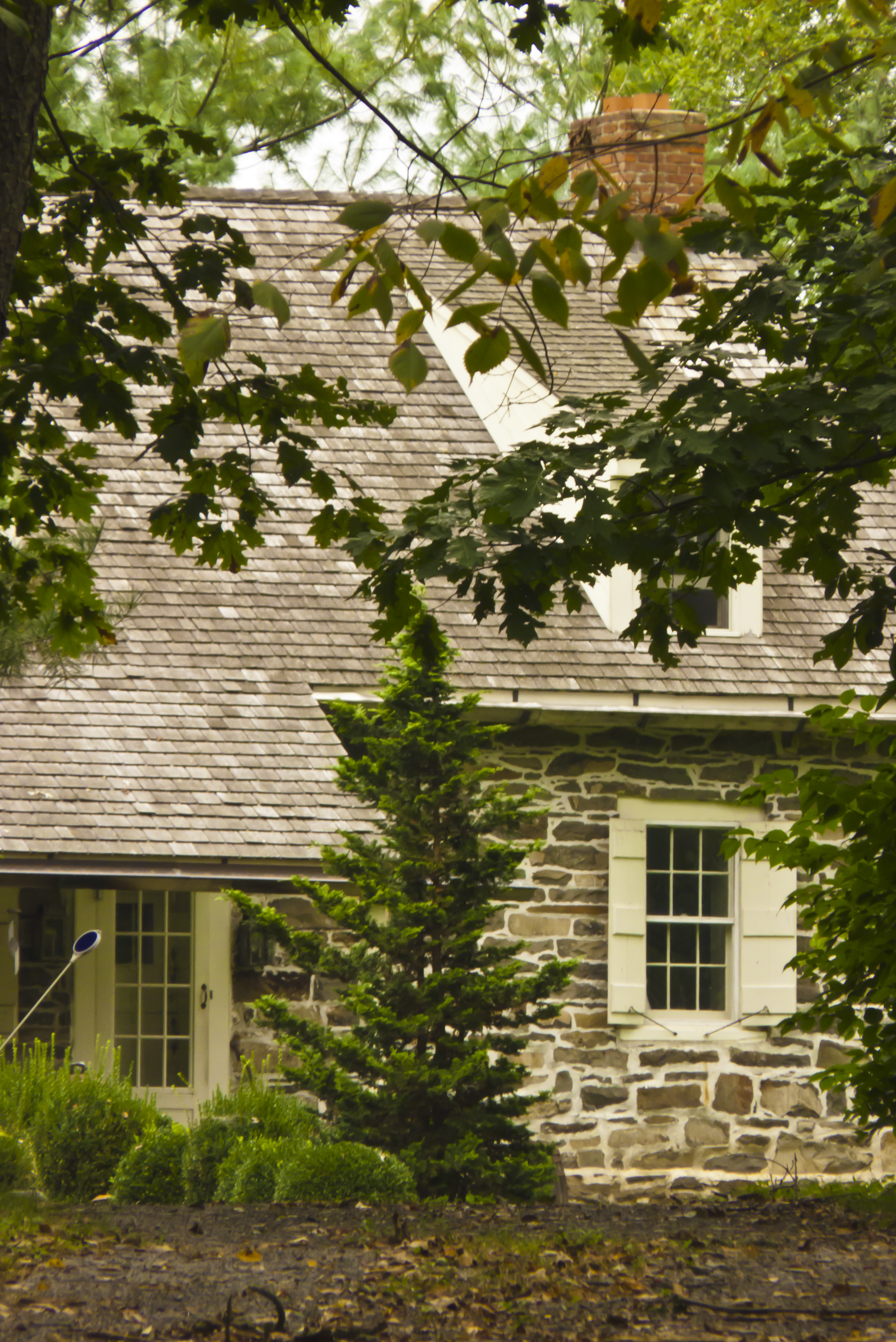

- Location within New York Location within the United States
- Location: 437 Springtown Rd., Rosendale, New York
- Coordinates: 41°48′16″N 74°5′12″W
- Area: 5 acres (2.0 ha)
- Built: 1750
- NRHP reference No.: 94001374
- Added to NRHP: November 25, 1994

DuBois-Deyo House is a historic home located at Rosendale in Ulster County, New York. It was built about 1750 and is composed of two sections. The main block is a two-story, four-by-two-bay stone and frame building with a two-story frame rear wing. Also on the property is a garage dated to about 1890.

The house was purchased by artist Carolee Schneemann in 1964 and became her primary residence until her death in 2019. Many of her artworks were created and filmed in the house, including the film Fuses.

It was listed on the National Register of Historic Places in 1994.
