= Leyden Street =

Historic street in Plymouth, Massachusetts

Coordinates: 41.9560°N 70.6635°W

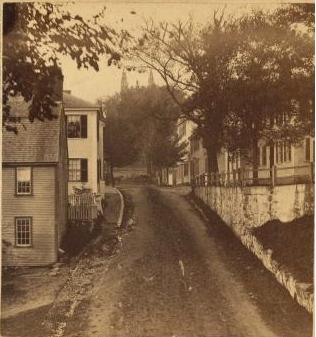
Leyden Street in the 1800s from a period stereograph

Leyden Street is a street in Plymouth, Massachusetts that was created in 1620 by the Pilgrims, and claims to be the oldest continuously inhabited street in the Thirteen Colonies of British America. It was originally named First Street; afterward in the Records it was called Great and Broad Street. It was named Leyden Street in 1823, but it is also known as Leiden Street or The Street.

== History ==
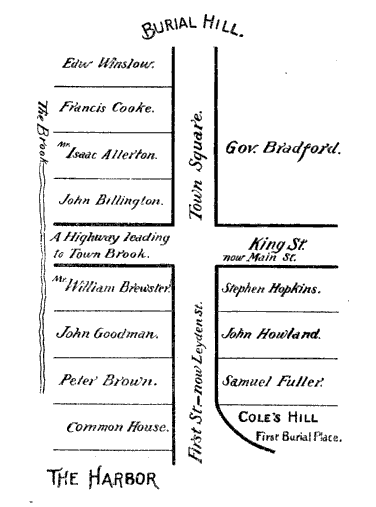
map of Pilgrim home lots on Leyden Street

The Pilgrims began laying out the street before Christmas in 1620 after disembarking from the Mayflower. The original settlers built their houses along the street from the shore up to the base of Burial Hill where the original fort building was located and now is the site of a cemetery and First Church of Plymouth. Town Brook is adjacent to the street and provided drinking water for the early colonists. Governor William Bradford, Dr. Samuel Fuller, Peter Browne, and other settlers owned lots along the road. The famed First Thanksgiving was likely held nearby in 1621. In 1823, the street was named Leyden Street after the city in Holland that offered the Pilgrims refuge before coming to America. Leyden Street has been re-created at nearby Plimouth Plantation to look as it probably did in 1627. Leyden Street has been used continuously since the original settlers built houses along it, making it the oldest continuously used road in the United States.

== Gallery ==
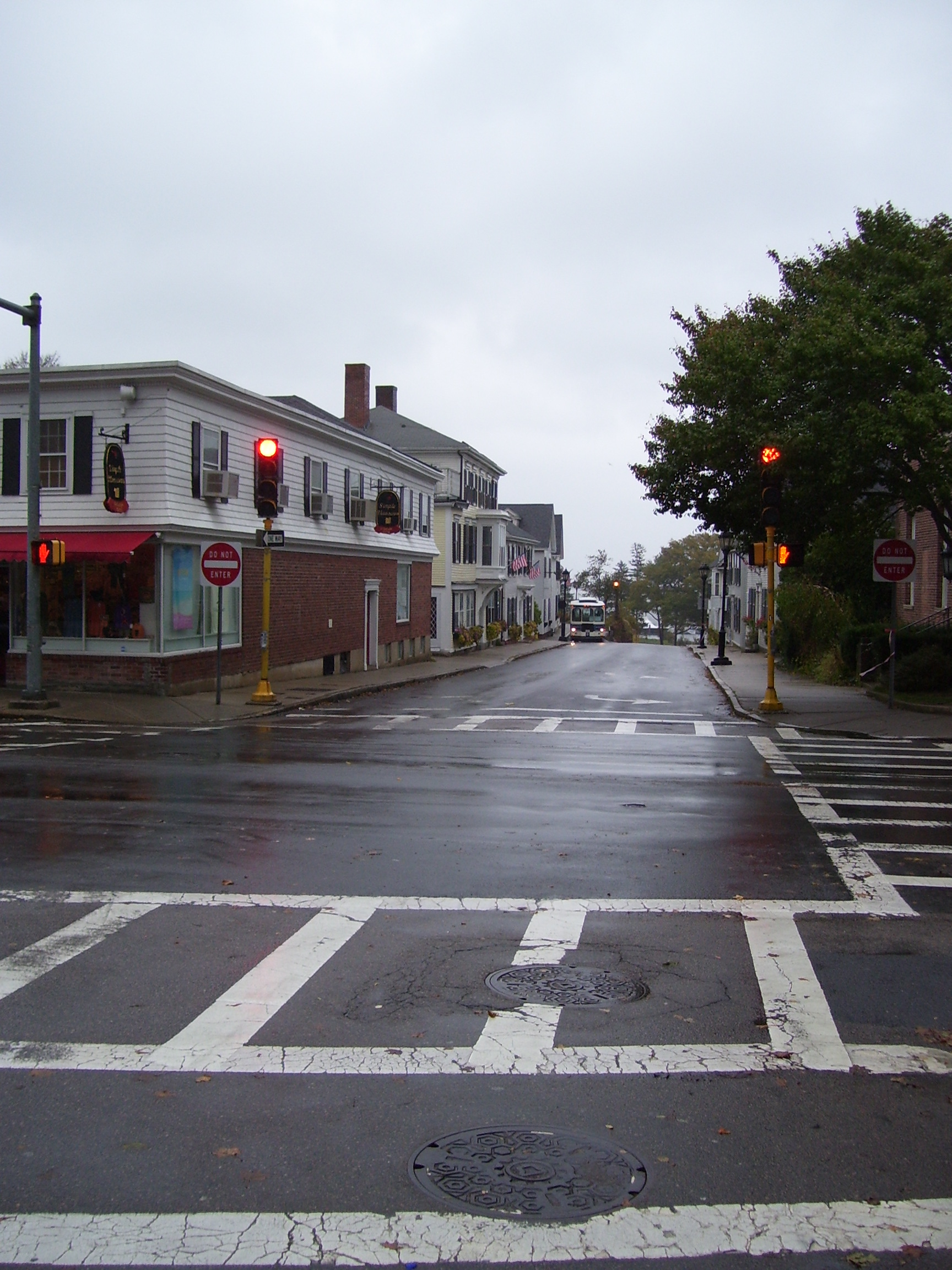
Leyden Street, the first street in Plymouth

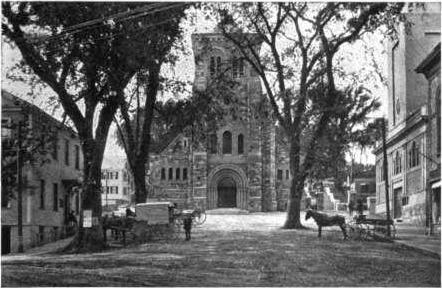
First Parish Church at the base of Burial Hill on the town square, is a continuation of the original Pilgrim church

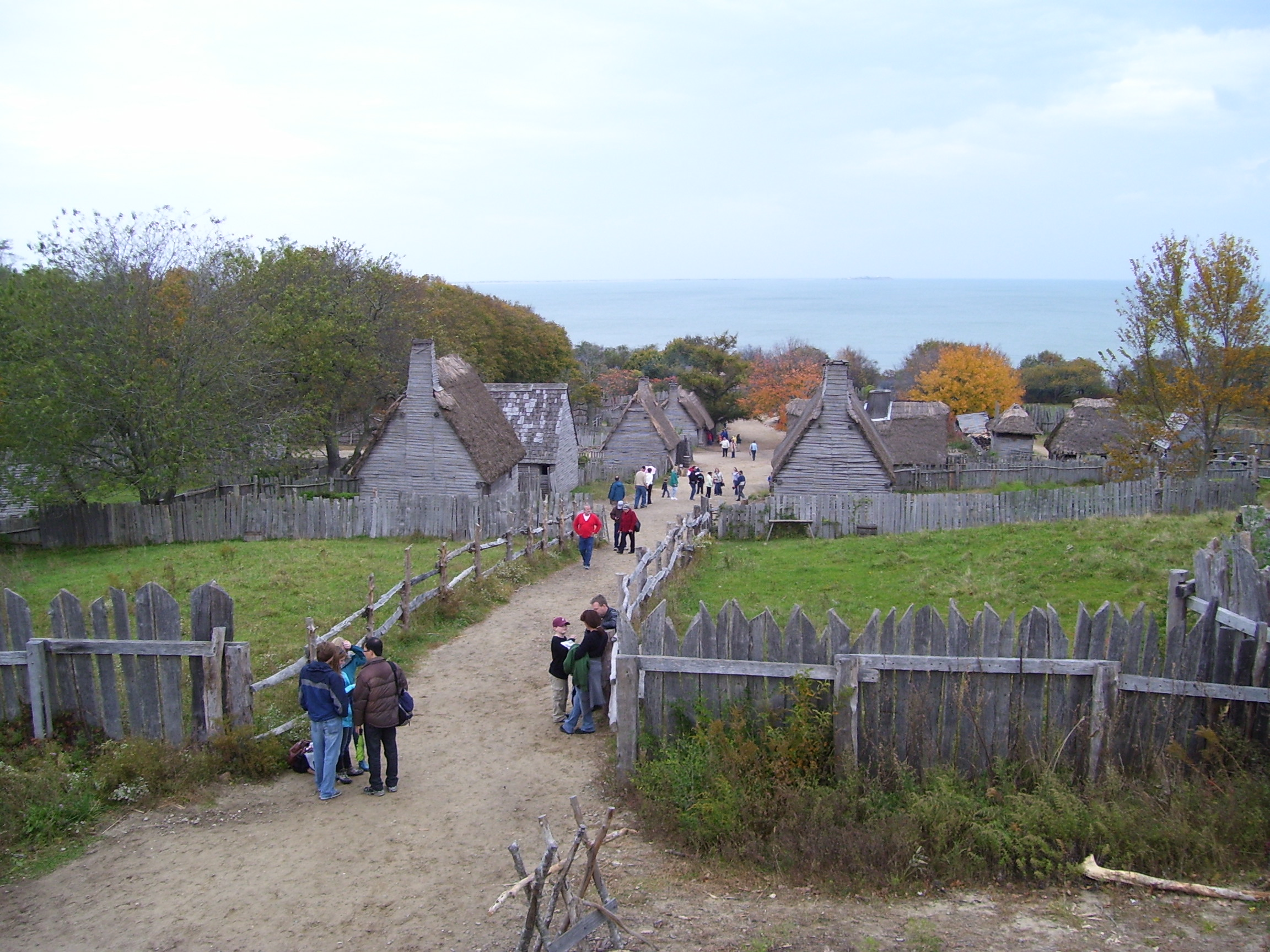
view from the fort at Plimoth Plantation, looking down a re-creation of Leyden Street, the first street in Plymouth

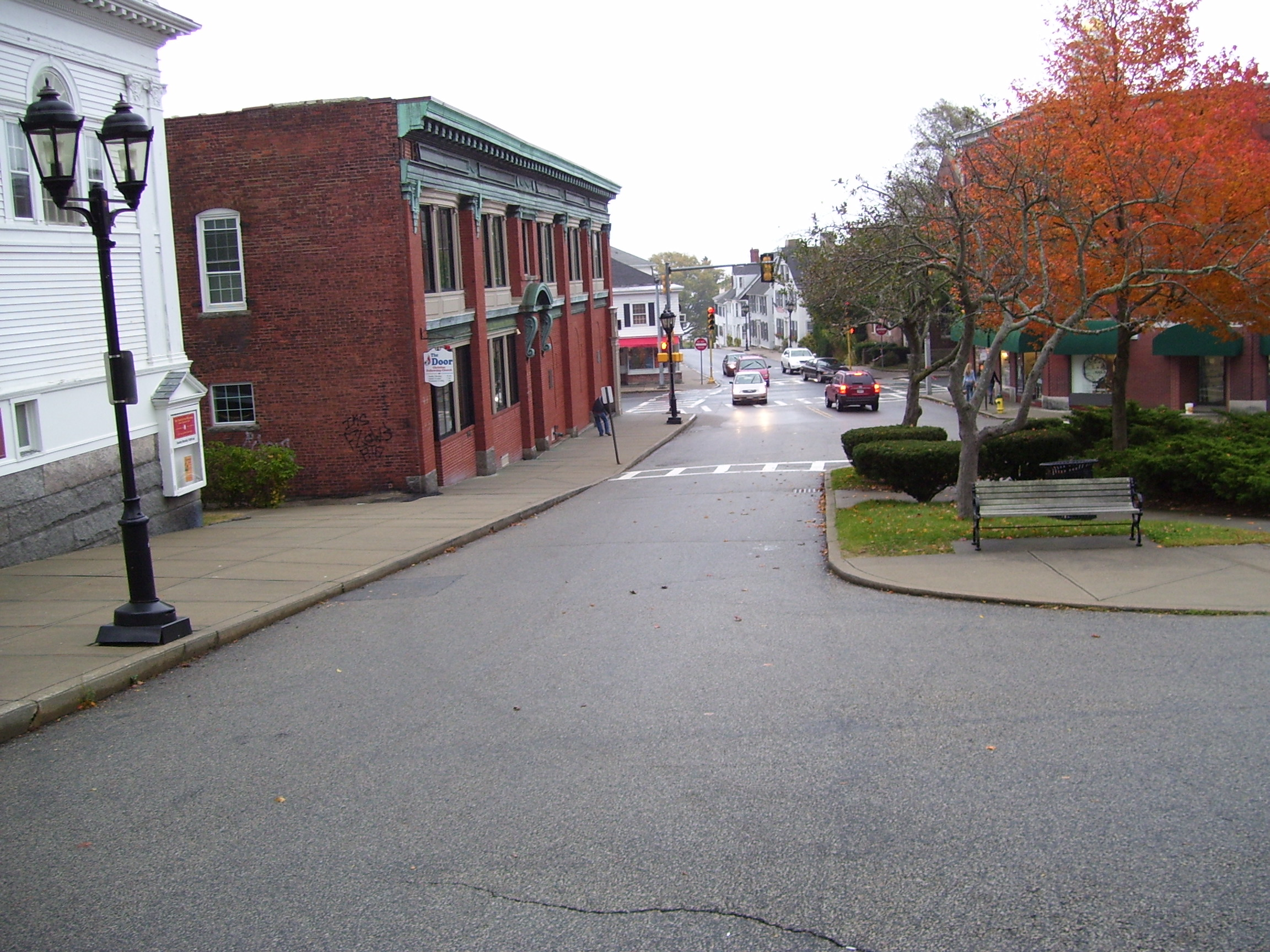
Leyden Street, the first street in Plymouth, as seen from First Parish Church in Plymouth

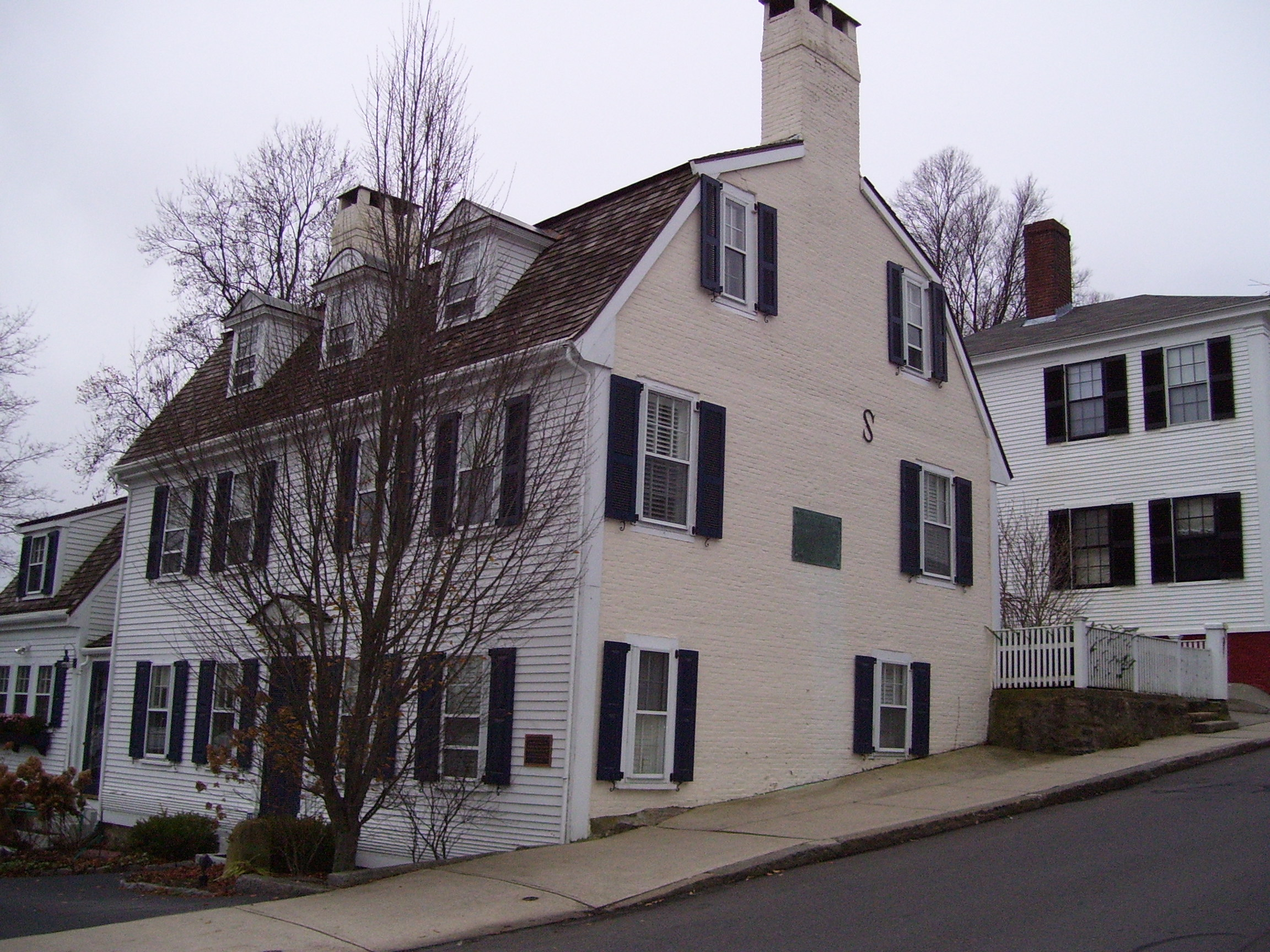
Town House site on Leyden Street

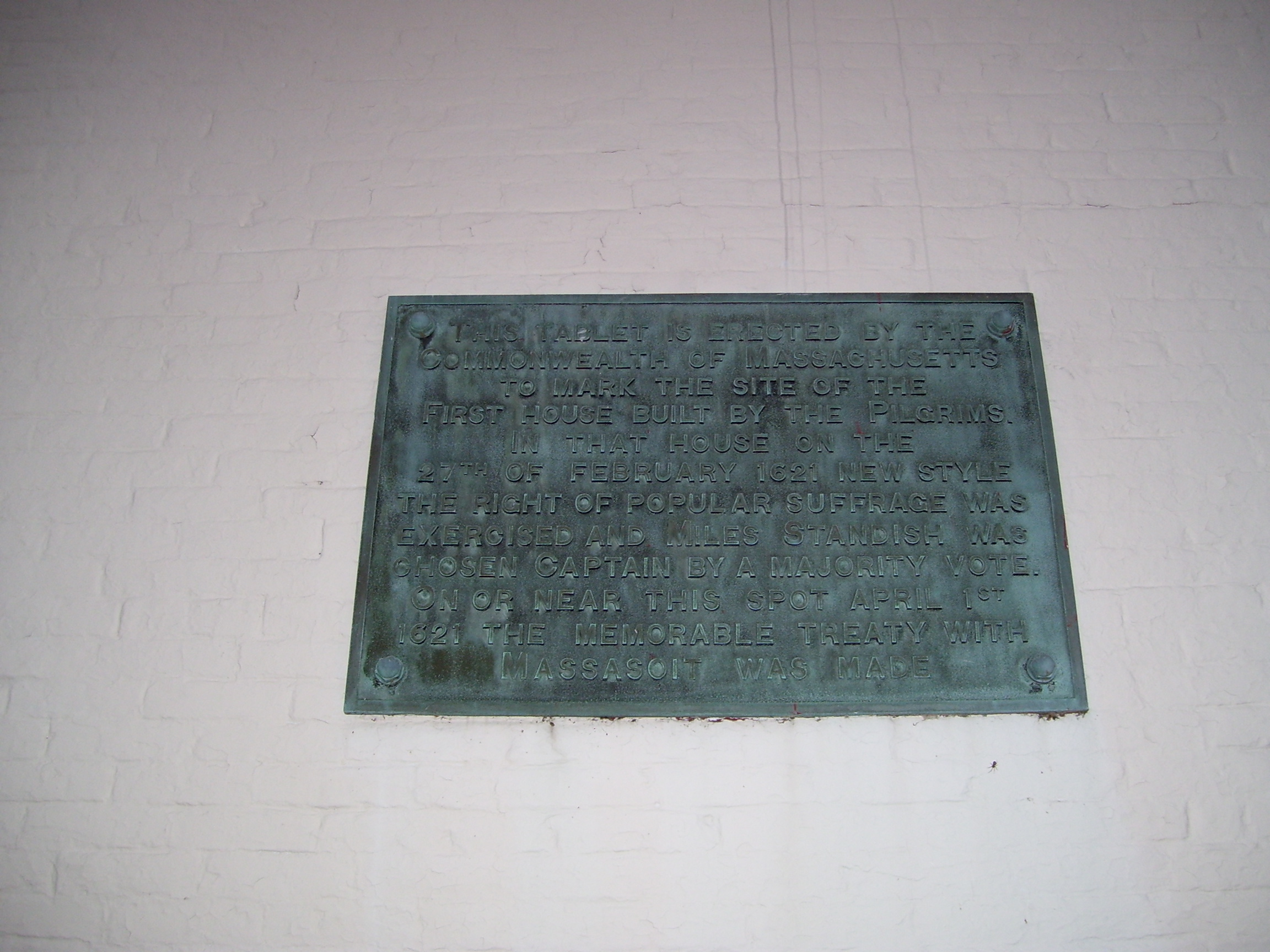
Town House site plaque on Leyden Street

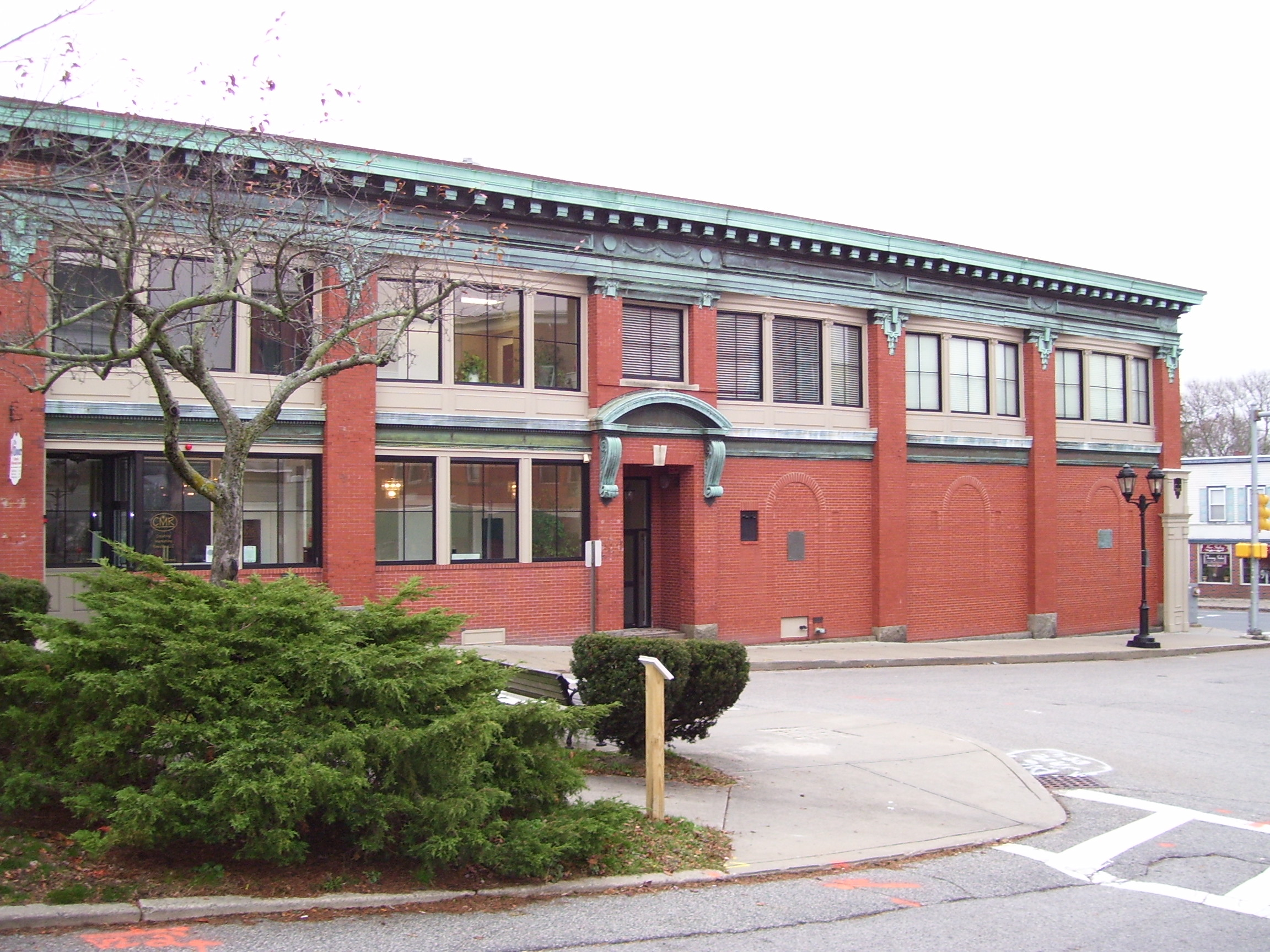
Site of William Bradford's home on Leyden Street

== See also ==
- Old County Courthouse
- First Church in Plymouth
- Burial Hill
