= Samuel Fuller (Pilgrim) =

Mayflower colonist (1580–1633)

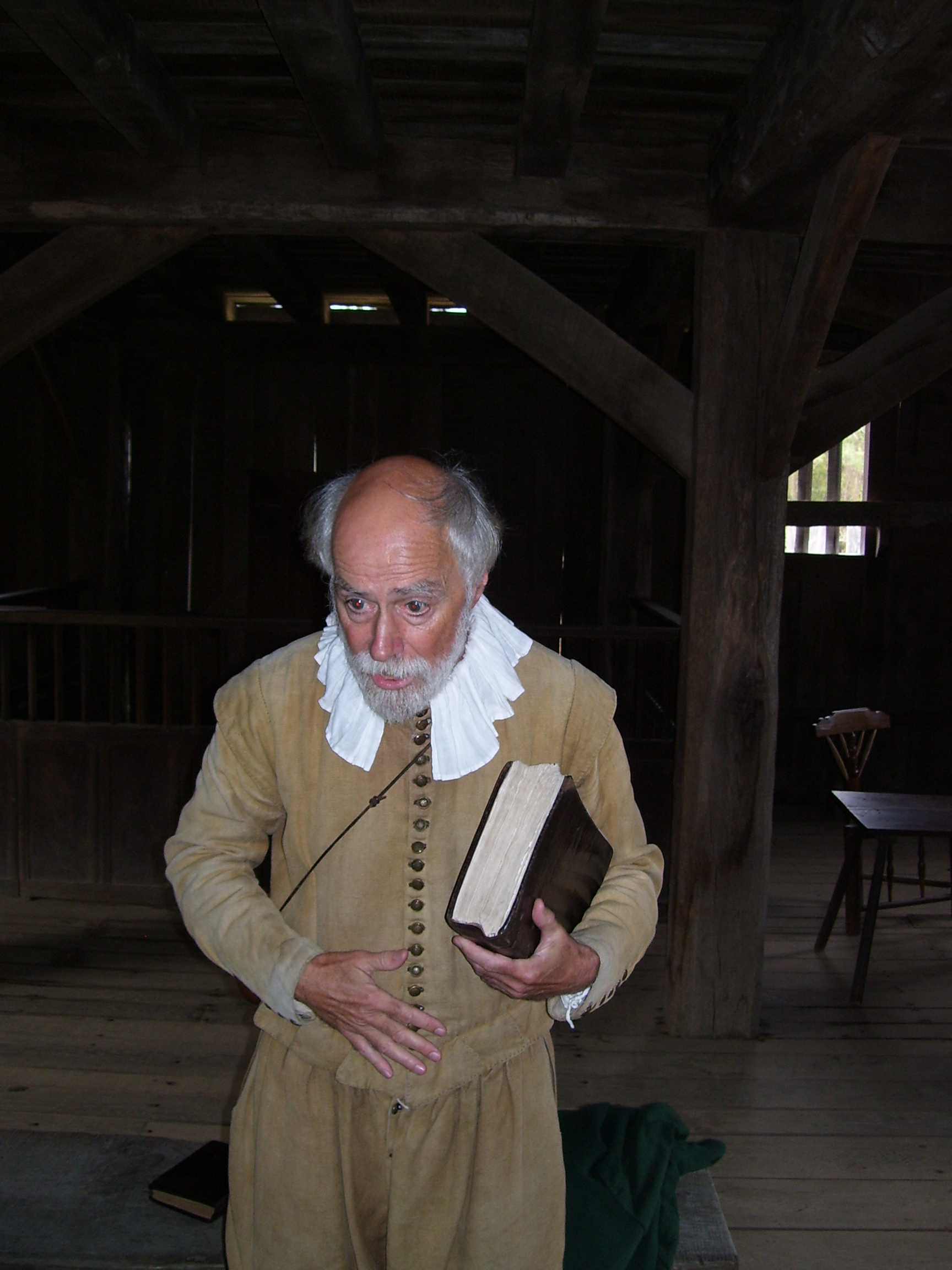
Dr. John Kemp of the Plimoth Plantation portraying Samuel Fuller (2009)

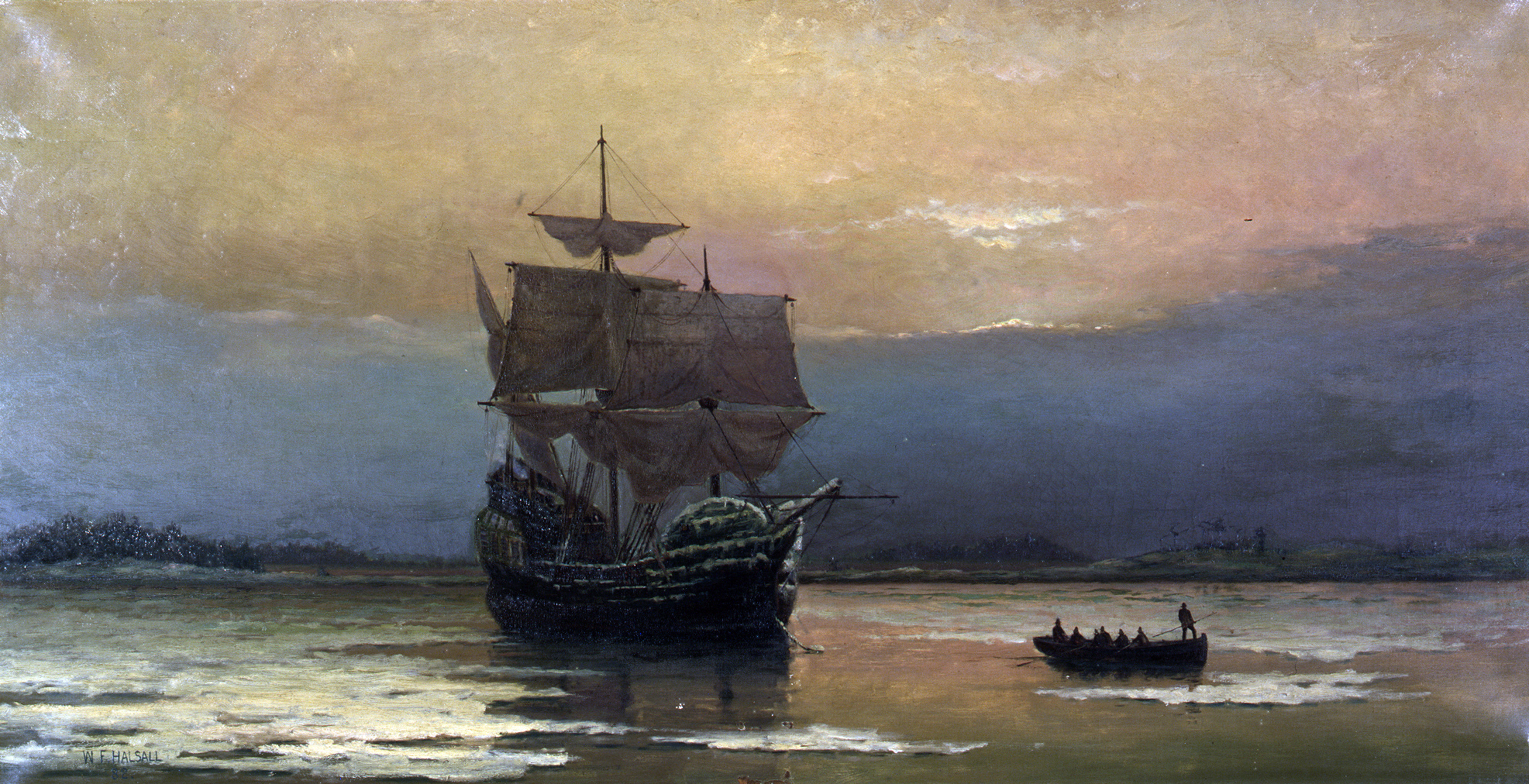
Mayflower in Plymouth Harbor by William Halsall (1899)

Samuel Fuller (c. 1580/81 – between August 9 and September 26, 1633, in Plymouth) was a passenger on the historic 1620 voyage of the Pilgrim ship Mayflower and became a respected church deacon and the physician for Plymouth Colony.

== English origin ==
Fuller was baptized on January 20, 1580, at Redenhall, county of Norfolk, England. He was a son of Robert Fuller, a butcher, and his first wife, Sarah Dunthorne. She was buried there on July 1, 1584. In 1614, Samuel is mentioned in the will of his father, but he was bequeathed a small amount of inheritance money, less even than his sisters, which may indicate his father's unhappiness with him.

== Life in Holland ==
Fuller's first mention in records of the time was of his move to Leiden by 1610, where he was a witness to his sister Ann's betrothal. And in 1611, he witnessed the betrothal of future Mayflower passenger Degory Priest to Sarah Allerton, sister of Mayflower passenger Isaac Allerton. His name also appears in the Leiden records as an active church congregation member. In Leiden records, he was referred to as "a serge worker of London."

On January 27, 1612, Fuller witnessed the betrothal of his half sister Anna to a William White, apparently not the Mayflower passenger of the same name. This one record entry has caused much confusion in more recent genealogy, with Mayflower passenger William White descendants mistakenly claiming that Ann Fuller married the Mayflower passenger in Leiden, whereas recent research assigns that William White a wife named Susanna Jackson. Additionally, the Society states that there is no proof that the Mayflower White family was ever in Leiden and, in fact, joined the company in England as non-religious members.

Fuller was betrothed to Agnes Carpenter, daughter of Alexander Carpenter, on March 15, 1613, in Leiden. They married on April 24, 1613. The marriage record notes a prior marriage to Alice Glasscock, who was deceased, but no records have been found of this marriage in Leiden or England.

On May 7, 1613, Fuller witnessed the betrothal of Alice Carpenter, sister to his wife Agnes, to Edward Southworth. Alice was later widowed and married Plymouth Governor William Bradford in 1623.

In mid-1615, Fuller's wife Agnes gave birth to a boy who died soon after and was buried on June 29, 1615, at St. Peter's in Leiden. Agnes died a few days later and was buried on July 3, 1615.

Records note that Samuel was living in the Groene Poort (Green Alley) neighborhood of Leiden "over against the clock tower" in 1615. On May 27, 1617, Fuller married Bridget Lee. His name appears in Leiden records as a witness to betrothals in his English religious community for several years more.

== Organizing of the voyage ==
Fuller was involved in the church's decision to move to Northern Virginia per agreement with the Virginia Company. He and congregation members Edward Winslow, William Bradford, and Isaac Allerton sent a letter on June 10, 1620, to their agents in England (John Carver and Robert Cushman) who were organizing the Mayflower voyage. The letter expressed the frustration that they were having with changes being made to the terms and conditions of the contract covering the voyage as being re-written by Merchant Adventurers agent Thomas Weston, who turned out to be quite disreputable in his dealing with the Mayflower Pilgrims in Plymouth. When the Mayflower departed England, none of the complaints had been resolved and the agreement had not been finalized. This problem persisted for more than a year and was partially resolved upon agent Robert Cushman's arrival on the Fortune in November 1621.

In preparation for the Mayflower voyage, Fuller may have tried to learn the rudiments of medical knowledge, knowing that the Mayflower would not have a doctor on board.

== Mayflower voyage ==
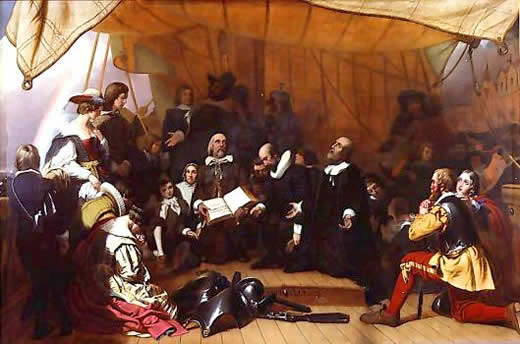
"The Embarkation of the Pilgrims from Delfthaven in Holland" (1844) by Robert Walter Weir

Fuller boarded the Mayflower with only his servant, William Butten, leaving his wife Bridget and his young daughter Bridget behind in Leiden, waiting until the colony conditions would better suit families. His brother Edward Fuller was also a passenger, and he traveled with his wife and son, Samuel.

The Mayflower departed Plymouth, England on September 6, 1620. They reached America's shores on November 9, 1620, after about three months at sea. They found themselves in Provincetown Harbor at the tip of Cape Cod, but they had been intending to settle near the mouth of the Hudson River. They spent several days trying to sail south, but strong winter seas forced them to return to the harbor at Cape Cod hook, where they anchored on November 11. Fuller and others signed the Mayflower Compact that day.

The small, 100-foot ship had carried 102 passengers and a crew of about 30 to 40 in extremely cramped conditions. By the second month out, the ship was being buffeted by strong westerly gales, causing the timbers to be badly shaken, with caulking failing to keep out sea water, and with passengers lying wet and ill. This and a lack of proper rations and unsanitary conditions for several months contributed to sickness that proved fatal for many, especially the majority of women and children. Two people died on the crossing, but the worst came after arriving in America. Almost half the passengers perished during that first cold, harsh, unfamiliar New England winter.

== Life in Plymouth Colony ==
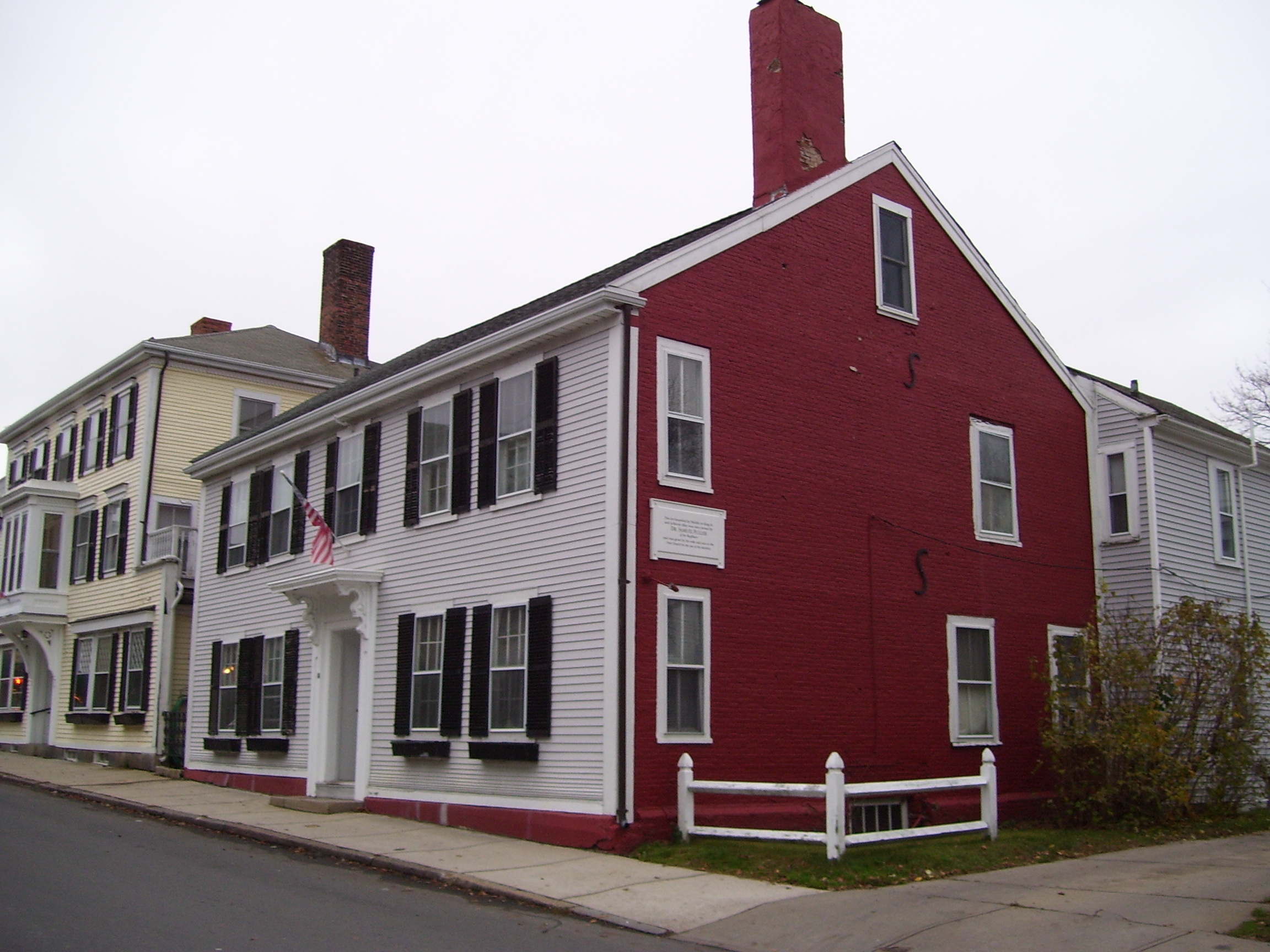
Site of Fuller's home on Leyden Street in Plymouth, Massachusetts

In the winter of 1620-21, almost half of the Pilgrims died. Fuller lost his brother, Edward, and sister-in-law, and he became the guardian of his nephew, Samuel. In 1623, Fuller's wife, Bridget, arrived on the ship Anne. Fuller received two acres of land in 1623 as part of the allocation of private plots, and his wife received her share "in with a corner by the pond."

In 1629, a group of settlers led by John Endicott, the founder of Salem, arrived in need of medical care and advice on church organization. Plymouth sent Fuller to assist, and Endicott later warmly expressed his appreciation in a letter to William Bradford dated May 11, 1629. A similar situation occurred in 1630 when Fuller aided colonists at Charlestown by letting blood (a common medical practice at the time) for some 20 persons. Letters from Bradford detail the situation at "Mattapan" and note that there were many sick and dead there.

In 1637, a former Plymouth resident named Thomas Morton wrote a scathing analysis of Fuller's medical abilities in his book New English Canaan. "But in mine opinion," writes Morton, "he deserves to be set upon a palfrey and led up and down in triumph through New Canaan, with a collar of Jurdans about his neck, as was one of like desert in Richard the Second's time through the streets of London, that men might know where to find a quacksalver."

In the summer of 1633, Fuller fell ill with an "infectious fever" that had spread through Plymouth by autumn. Nathaniel Morton wrote about Fuller's death in his 1669 New England's Memorial: "Mr. Samuel Fuller then died, after he had much helped others, and was a comfort to them; he was their surgeon and physician, and did much good in his place, being not only useful in his faculty, but otherwise, as he was a godly man, and served Christ in his office of a deacon in the church for many years, and forward to do good in his place, and was much missed after God removed him out of this world."

== Family ==
Samuel Fuller married three times:

His first wife was Alice Glasscock, he possibly married her in England, she died by 1613. Then, he wed Agnes Carpenter, when she was around about 24 years old, they married in Leiden April 23, 1613. Banks states they were married March 15, 1613. She was one of five daughters of Alexander and Priscilla Carpenter of Wrington, co. Somerset, near Bristol and all were later residents of Leiden by about 1600. Witnesses at her wedding were her father Alexander, sister Alice and Edward Southworth, who would become Alice's husband a month after Agnes' wedding. In 1615, Agnes gave birth to an unnamed child who died at birth and was buried in Leiden on June 29. Agnes herself died soon after, possibly from complications, the exact date of her death being unknown. She was buried at St. Pieterskerk (St. Peter's Church) in Leiden on July 3, 1615. His third marriage was with Bridget Lee in Leiden on May 27, 1617. She died May 2, 1667. Banks states she was the daughter of Joyce Lee and sister of Samuel Lee and that she married Samuel Fuller on May 12, 1617.

Child of Samuel Fuller and wife Agnes:

- Two unnamed children who died young and were buried in Leiden. In 1615 Agnes gave birth to an unnamed child who died soon after and was buried at St. Peter's Church in Leiden on June 29, 1615.

Children of Samuel Fuller and wife Bridget:

- Mercy born after May 22, 1627. She was still living as of Bradford's list of passengers made in 1651, but there is no further record.
- Samuel born about 1629. Samuel died on August 17, 1695.

Samuel Fuller (Jr) married:

1. Susanna

2. Elizabeth (Nicholas) Bowen between April 11, 1663, and May 2, 1667, and had seven children.

== Will ==
Samuel Fuller made out his will on July 30, 1633, calling himself "sick and weak," and died sometime between August 9 and September 26, 1633.

His will was proved October 28, 1633, and his estate inventory was presented to the court the following January.

== Servant traveling in company with Samuel Fuller on the Mayflower ==
William Butten sailed on the Mayflower as an indentured servant to Samuel Fuller, and was listed as "a youth." According to popular belief, his father had died when he was young and his mother could not financially support him. Author Caleb Johnson provides his research that the Butten family had an early association with the Leiden Separatists, and that William, son of John, was baptized on March 13, 1605, at Worksop, Nottinghamshire. Some Leiden church members were known in Worksop, as early Separatist churches were developed there. Worksop is located near William Bradford's birthplace in Austerfield, Yorkshire.

Butten was sick for most of the two-month Mayflower voyage and died on November 6, 1620 – just three days before the sighting of Cape Cod. William Bradford wrote "in all this voyage there died but one of the passengers, which was William Butten, a youth, servant to Samuel Fuller, when they drew near the coast."

Provincetown on Cape Cod has several present-day memorials to William Butten and several others who were the earliest Mayflower passengers to die.
