= Plymouth Colony =

English colonial venture in America (1620–1691)

- 1620–1686; 1689–1691
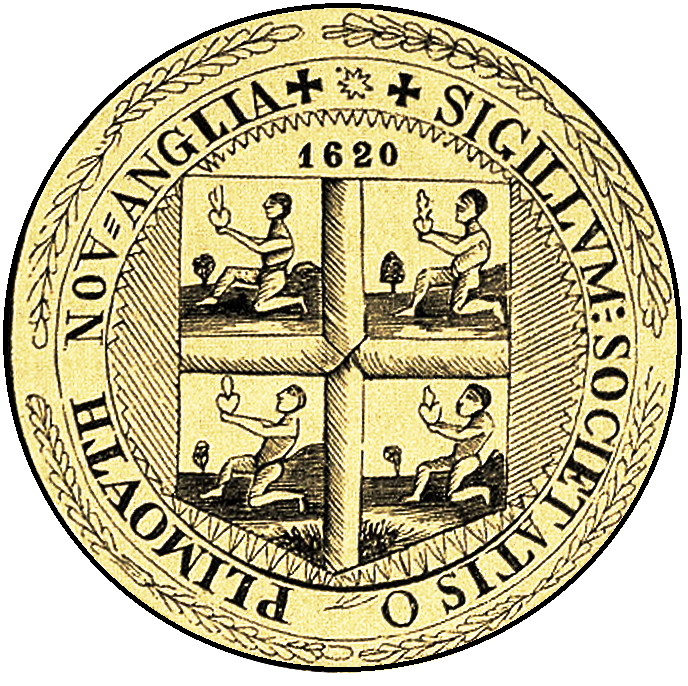
- Seal

- Plymouth Colony town locations
- Status: Self-governing colony of England
- Capital: Plymouth; 41°57′27″N 70°39′45″W
- Official languages: English
- Religion: Puritanism
- Governor
  - 1620–1621: John Carver (first)
  - 1689–1692: Thomas Hinckley (last)
- Legislature: General Court
- Historical era: British colonization of the Americas; Puritan migration to New England (1620–1640)
  - Charter given: 1620; 406 years ago
  - First Thanksgiving: 1621
  - Pequot War: 1636–1638
  - New England Confederation formed: 1643
  - King Philip's War: 1675–1676
  - Joseph Dudley is made governor of New England: 25 May 1686
  - Boston revolt: 18 April 1689
  - Massachusetts Charter issued: 7 October 1691
Preceded by	Succeeded by
1620: Wampanoag; 1689: Dominion of New England	1691: Province of Massachusetts Bay; 1686: Dominion of New England

Plymouth Colony (sometimes spelled Plimouth) was the first permanent English colony in New England, founded in 1620, and the third permanent English colony in America, after Newfoundland and the Jamestown Colony. It was settled by the passengers on the Mayflower at a location that had previously been surveyed and named by Captain John Smith. The settlement served as the capital of the colony and developed as the town of Plymouth, Massachusetts. At its height, Plymouth Colony occupied most of what is now the southeastern portion of Massachusetts; it was approximately coterminous with the combined territories of Plymouth, Barnstable, and Bristol Counties, all of which were originally established by the General Court of the Plymouth Colony. Many of the people and events surrounding Plymouth Colony have become part of American folklore, including the American tradition of Thanksgiving and the monument of Plymouth Rock.

Plymouth Colony was founded by a group of Protestant Separatists initially known as the Brownist Emigration, who came to be known as the Pilgrims. The colony established a treaty with Wampanoag chief Massasoit which helped to ensure its success; in this, they were aided by Squanto, a member of the Patuxet tribe. Plymouth played a central role in King Philip's War (1675–1678), one of several Indian Wars. The colony was ultimately merged with the Massachusetts Bay Colony and other territories in 1691 to form the Province of Massachusetts Bay.

Despite the colony's relatively short independent existence, Plymouth holds a special role in American history. The social and legal systems of the colony became closely tied to their religious beliefs, as well as to English custom.

== History ==
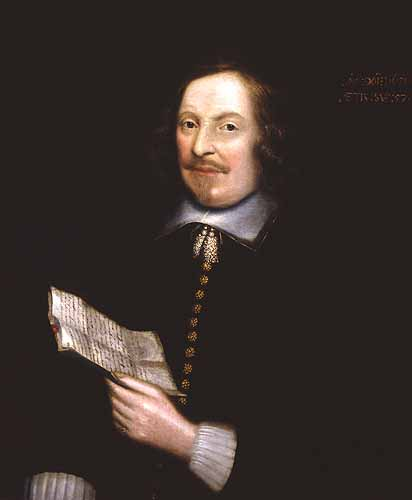
Edward Winslow negotiated the treaty with the Wampanoags, served as the Pilgrims' ambassador to their financial backers in England, and was as one of the first governors of Plymouth Colony. This portrait is the only portrait of a Pilgrim that was painted from life.

=== Origin ===
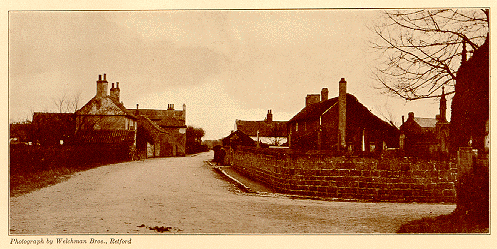
The village of Scrooby, England, c. 1911, home of the Mayflower Pilgrims until 1607

Plymouth Colony was founded by a group of Brownists (a sect of English Protestant dissenters) who came to be known as the Pilgrims. The core group (roughly 40 percent of the adults and 56 percent of the family groupings) were part of a congregation led in America by William Bradford and William Brewster. They began to feel the pressures of religious persecution by the Church of England while still in the English village of Scrooby, near East Retford, Nottinghamshire. In 1607, Archbishop Tobias Matthew raided homes and imprisoned several members of the congregation. The congregation left England in 1608 and moved to the Netherlands, settling first in Amsterdam and then in Leiden.

In Leiden, the congregation gained the freedom to worship as they chose, but Dutch society was foreign to them. Scrooby had been an agricultural community, whereas Leiden was a thriving industrial center, and they found the pace of life difficult. The community remained close-knit, but their children began adopting the Dutch language and customs, and some also entered the Dutch Army. They were also still harassed by the English Crown: English authorities came to Leiden to arrest William Brewster in 1618 after he published sharp criticism of the King of England and the Anglican Church. Brewster escaped arrest, but the events spurred the congregation to move farther from England.

The congregation obtained a land patent from the Plymouth Company in June 1619. They had declined the opportunity to settle south of Cape Cod in New Netherland because of their desire to avoid Dutch influence. The Plymouth land patent allowed them to settle at the mouth of the Hudson River. They obtained financial backing through the Merchant Adventurers, a group of businessmen who sought to profit from the colony once the Pilgrims began working to repay their debts. (Note: The debts were paid off by working 6 days a week for the sponsors. It was not paid off until 1648 because of hardships experienced during the early years of the settlement, as well as corruption and mismanagement by their representatives.)

With the funds secured from the Merchant Adventurers, the Colonists bought provisions and obtained passage on the Mayflower and the Speedwell. They had intended to leave early in 1620, but they were delayed several months by complications with the Merchant Adventurers, including several changes in plans for the voyage and financing. The congregation and the other colonists finally boarded the Speedwell in July 1620 in the Dutch port of Delfshaven.

=== Mayflower voyage ===
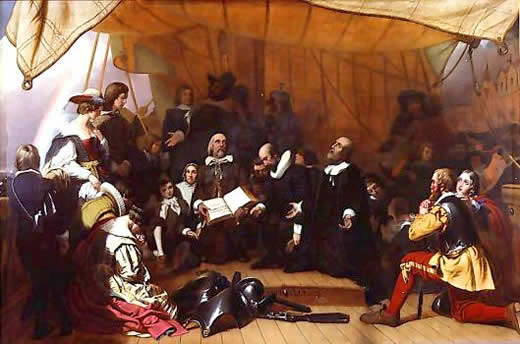
Embarkation of the Pilgrims, an 1844 portrait by Robert Walter Weir, which now hangs in the United States Capitol rotunda

Speedwell was re-rigged with larger masts before leaving Holland and setting out to meet Mayflower in Southampton, England, around the end of July 1620. The Mayflower was purchased in London. The original captains were Captain Reynolds for Speedwell and Captain Christopher Jones for Mayflower. Other passengers joined the group in Southampton, including William Brewster, who had been in hiding for the better part of a year, and a group known to the Leiden congregation as "The Strangers", extra workers and staff largely recruited by the Merchant Adventurers. The term was also used for many of the indentured servants who paid for their passage by binding themselves to a period of service.

Among the Strangers were Myles Standish, who was the colony's military leader; Christopher Martin, who had been designated by the Merchant Adventurers to act as shipboard governor during the trans-Atlantic trip; and Stephen Hopkins, a veteran of a failed colonial venture that may have inspired William Shakespeare's The Tempest. The group who later became the Leiden Leaders after the merging of ships included John Carver, William Bradford, Edward Winslow, William Brewster, and Isaac Allerton.

The departure of the Mayflower and Speedwell was beset by delays, including further disagreements with the Merchant Adventurers. A total of 120 passengers finally departed on August 5: 90 on the Mayflower and 30 on the Speedwell. Leaving Southampton, the Speedwell took on significant leakage, which required the ships to immediately put in at Dartmouth. The leakage was partly caused by being overmasted and pressed with too much sail. Repairs were completed, and a further delay ensued as they awaited favorable winds. The two ships finally set sail on August 23; they traveled only 200 miles (320 km) beyond Land's End before another major leak in the Speedwell forced the expedition to return again to England, this time to the port of Plymouth. The Speedwell was found to be unseaworthy; some passengers abandoned their attempt to emigrate, while others joined the Mayflower, overcrowding the already heavily burdened ship. Later, it was speculated that the crew of the Speedwell had intentionally sabotaged the ship to avoid having to make the treacherous trans-Atlantic voyage. The delays had significant consequences; the cost of repairs and port fees required that the colonists sell some of their vital provisions. More importantly, the late-autumn voyage meant that everyone had to spend the coming winter on board the Mayflower off Cape Cod in increasingly squalid conditions.

The Mayflower departed Plymouth, England, on September 6, 1620, with 102 passengers and about 30 crew members in the 106 feet (32 m) long ship. The seas were not severe during the first month on the Atlantic, but in the second month the ship was badly shaken by strong north-Atlantic winter gales, causing leaks from structural damage. There were many hardships and dangers throughout the trip, including seasickness and the bending and cracking of a main beam of the ship. One death occurred, that of William Button.

After two months at sea, they sighted land on November 9, 1620, off the coast of Cape Cod. They attempted to sail south to the designated landing site at the mouth of the Hudson but ran into trouble at Pollock Rip, a shallow area of shoals between Cape Cod and Nantucket Island. With winter approaching and provisions running dangerously low, the passengers decided to return north to Cape Cod Bay and abandon their original landing plans.

=== Prior exploration and settlements ===
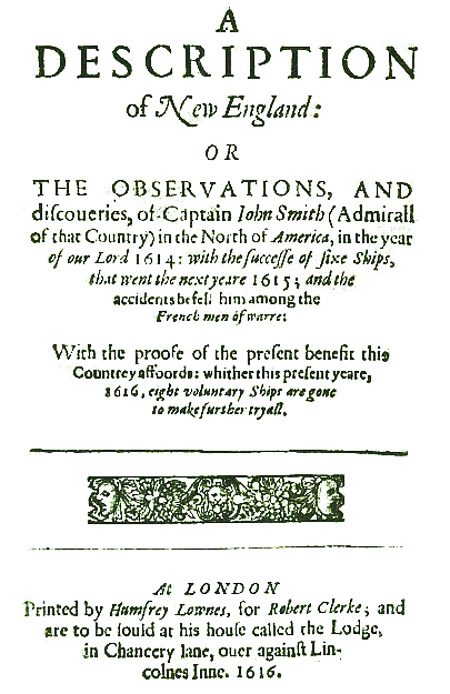
The cover of John Smith's A Description of New England, published in 1616, which was the first text to use the name "New Plymouth" to describe the site of the future colony

The Pilgrims were not the first Europeans in the area. John Cabot's discovery of Newfoundland in 1497 had laid the foundation for the extensive English claims over the east coast of America. Cartographer Giacomo Gastaldi made one of the earliest maps of New England c. 1540, but he erroneously identified Cape Breton with the Narragansett Bay and completely omitted most of the New England coast. European fishermen had also been plying the waters off the New England coast for much of the 16th and 17th centuries.

Frenchman Samuel de Champlain had explored the area extensively in 1605. He had specifically explored Plymouth Harbor, which he called "Port St. Louis," and he made an extensive and detailed map of it and the surrounding lands. He showed the Patuxet village (where the town of Plymouth was later built) as a thriving settlement. However, an epidemic wiped out up to 90% of the Indigenous peoples along the Massachusetts coast in 1617–1619, including the Patuxets, before the arrival of the Mayflower. The epidemic has traditionally been thought to be smallpox, but a recent analysis suggests it was a lesser-known disease called leptospirosis. The absence of any serious Indian opposition to the Pilgrims' settlement may have been pivotal to their success and to English colonization in America.

Popham Colony, also known as Fort St. George, was organized by the Plymouth Company (unrelated to Plymouth Colony) and founded in 1607 on the coast of Maine. Beset by internal political struggles, sickness, and weather problems, it was abandoned in 1608.

Captain John Smith of Jamestown had explored the area in 1614 and is credited with naming the region New England. He named many locations using approximations of Indian words. He gave the name "Accomack" to the Patuxet settlement on which the Pilgrims founded Plymouth, but he changed it to New Plymouth after consulting Prince Charles, son of King James. A map published in his 1616 work A Description of New England clearly shows the site as "New Plimouth."

In the Mayflower settlers' first explorations of Cape Cod, they came across evidence that Europeans had previously spent extensive time there. They discovered remains of a European fort and uncovered a grave that contained the remains of both an adult European male and a native child.

=== Landings at Provincetown and Plymouth ===
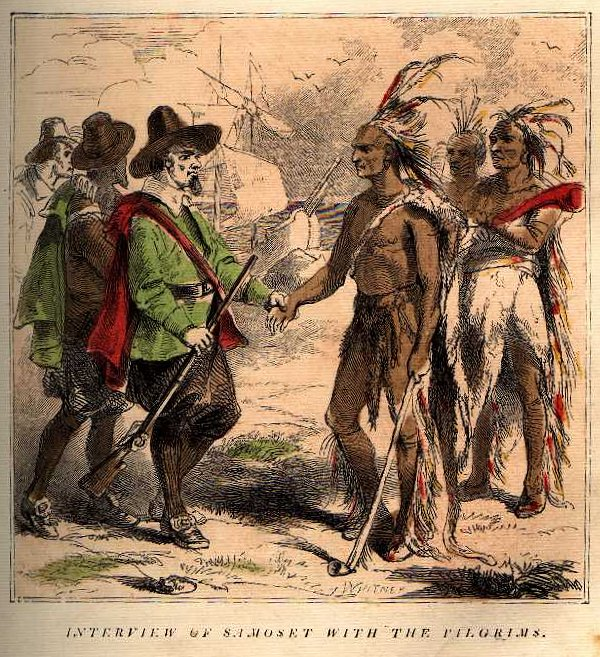
Interview of Samoset with the Pilgrims, an 1852 book engraving

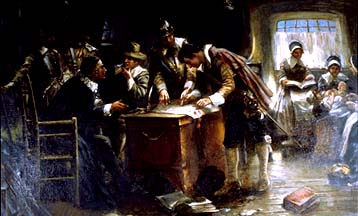
"Signing of the Mayflower Compact" by Edward Percy Moran, c. 1900

The Mayflower anchored at Provincetown Harbor on November 11, 1620. The Pilgrims did not have a patent to settle this area, and some passengers began to question their right to land, objecting that there was no legal authority to establish a colony and hence no guarantee of retaining ownership over any land that they settled. In response to this, a group of colonists drafted and signed the Mayflower Compact while still aboard the ship as it lay at anchor, which became the first governing document for the colony. The compact established a means of governing the colony along the lines of an English town. It also served as a first step to legitimize the colony, relieving the property concerns of many of the settlers. This social contract was written and signed by 41 male passengers. It was modeled on the church covenants that Congregationalists used to form new congregations. It made clear that the colony should be governed by "just and equal laws," and those who signed it promised to keep those laws.

The group remained on board the ship through the next day for prayer and worship, as it was Sunday. They finally set foot on land at Provincetown on November 13. The first task was to rebuild a shallop, a shallow draft boat that had been disassembled for transport aboard the Mayflower. It remained with the Pilgrims when the Mayflower returned to England. On November 15, Captain Myles Standish led a party of 16 men on an exploratory mission, during which they disturbed an Indian grave and located a buried cache of Indian corn. The following week, Susanna White gave birth to son Peregrine White on the Mayflower. He was the first child born to the Pilgrims in the New World. The shallop was finished on November 27, and it carried a second expedition led by Mayflower master Christopher Jones. Thirty-four men went, but the expedition was beset by bad weather, though they did find an Indian burial ground with corn grave offerings, which they took for future planting. A third expedition along Cape Cod left on December 6; it resulted in a skirmish with natives known as the "First Encounter" near Eastham, Massachusetts. The colonists decided to look elsewhere, having failed to find a proper site for settlement, and fearing that they had angered the natives by taking their corn and firing upon them. The Mayflower left Provincetown Harbor and set sail for Plymouth Harbor.

The Mayflower dropped anchor in Plymouth Harbor on December 16 and spent three days looking for a settlement site. They rejected several sites, including one on Clark's Island and another at the mouth of the Jones River, in favor of the site of a recently abandoned settlement which had been occupied by the Patuxet tribe. The location was chosen largely for its defensive position. The settlement would be centered on two hills: Cole's Hill, where the village would be built, and Fort Hill, where a defensive cannon would be stationed. Also important in choosing the site was that the prior villagers had cleared much of the land, making agriculture relatively easy. Fresh water for the colony was provided by Town Brook and Billington Sea. There are no contemporaneous accounts to verify the legend, but Plymouth Rock is often hailed as the point where the colonists first set foot on their new homeland.

The area where the colonists settled had been identified as "New Plymouth" in maps which John Smith published in 1614. The colonists elected to retain the name for their own settlement, in honor of their final point of departure from Plymouth, Devon.

=== First winter ===
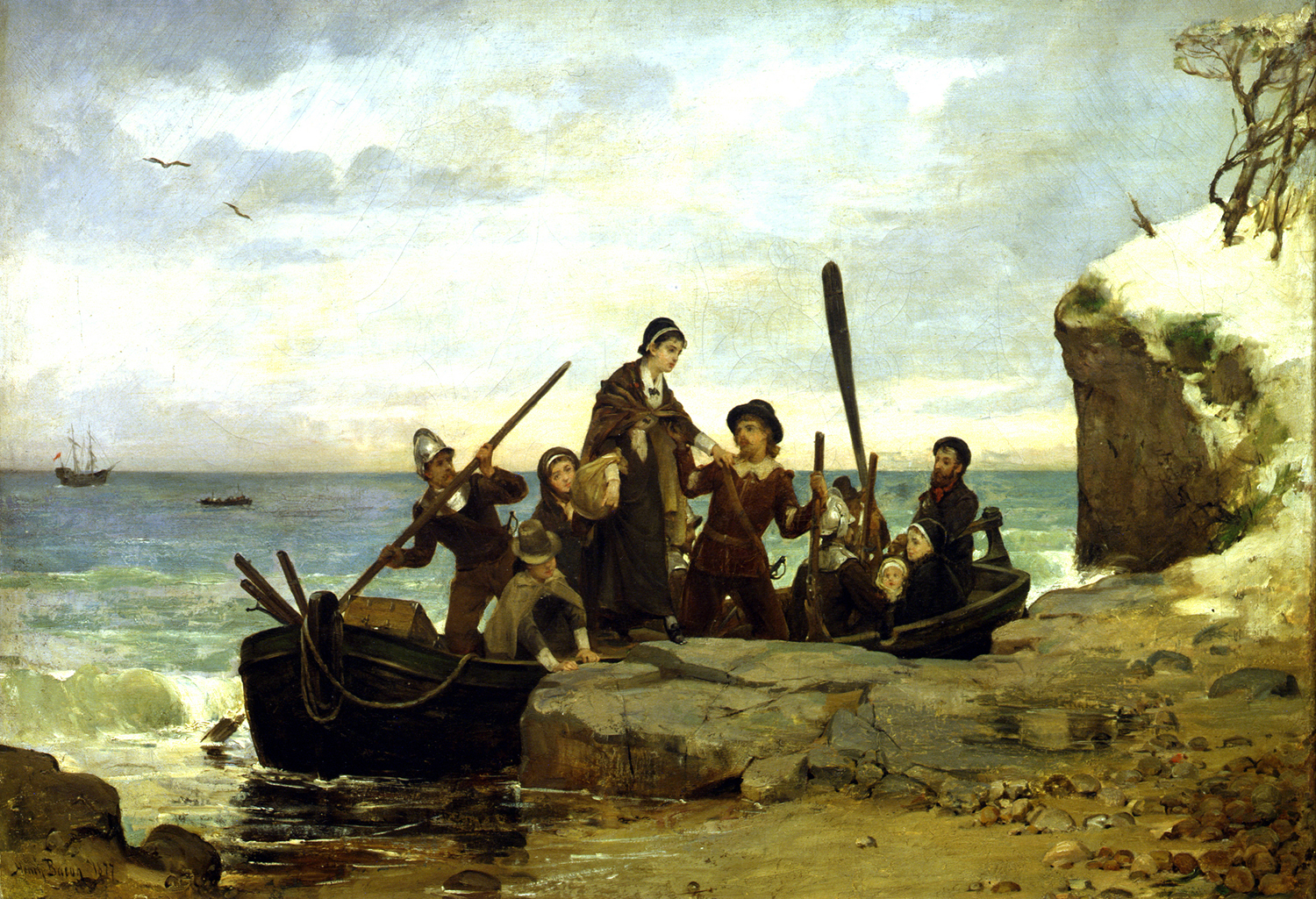
The Landing of the Pilgrims, an 1877 portrait by Henry Bacon

On December 21, 1620, the first landing party arrived at the site of Plymouth. Plans to build houses, however, were delayed by bad weather until December 23. As the building progressed, 20 men always remained ashore on guard while the rest of the work crews returned each night to the Mayflower. Women, children, and the infirm remained on board the Mayflower, and many had not left the ship for six months. The first structure was a common house of wattle and daub, and it took two weeks to complete in the harsh New England winter. In the following weeks, the rest of the settlement slowly took shape. The living and working structures were built on the relatively flat top of Cole's Hill, and a wooden platform was constructed atop nearby Fort Hill to support the cannon that would defend the settlement.

During the winter, the Mayflower colonists suffered greatly from lack of shelter, diseases such as scurvy, and general conditions on board ship. Many of the men were too infirm to work; 45 out of 102 pilgrims died and were buried on Cole's Hill. Only seven residences and four common houses were constructed during the first winter out of a planned 19. By the end of January, enough of the settlement had been built to begin unloading provisions from the Mayflower.

The men of the settlement organized themselves into military orders in mid-February, after several tense encounters with local Indians, and Myles Standish was designated as the commanding officer. By the end of the month, five cannons had been defensively positioned on Fort Hill. John Carver was elected governor to replace Governor Martin.

On March 16, 1621, the first formal contact occurred with the Indians. Samoset was an Abenaki sagamore originally from Pemaquid Point in Maine. He had learned some English there from fishermen and trappers, and he walked boldly into the settlement and proclaimed, "Welcome, Englishmen!" It was during this meeting that the Pilgrims learned how the previous residents of Patuxet had died of an epidemic. They also learned that an important leader of the region was Wampanoag Indian chief Massasoit, and they learned about Squanto (Tisquantum), the sole survivor from Patuxet. Squanto had spent time in Europe and spoke fluent English. Samoset spent the night in Plymouth and agreed to arrange a meeting with Massasoit's men.

Massasoit and Squanto were apprehensive about the Pilgrims, as several men of their tribe had been killed by English sailors. They also knew that the Pilgrims had taken some corn stores in their landings at Provincetown. Squanto himself had been abducted in 1614 by English explorer Thomas Hunt and had spent five years in Europe, first as a slave for a group of Spanish monks, then as a freeman in England. He had returned to New England in 1619, acting as a guide to explorer Capt. Robert Gorges, but Massasoit and his men had massacred the crew of the ship and had taken Squanto.

Samoset returned to Plymouth on March 22 with a delegation from Massasoit that included Squanto; Massasoit joined them shortly after, and he and Governor Carver established a formal treaty of peace after exchanging gifts. This treaty ensured that each people would not harm the other, that Massasoit would send his allies to negotiate with Plymouth, and that they would come to each other's aid in a time of war.

The Mayflower set sail for England on April 5, 1621, after being anchored for almost four months in Plymouth Harbor. Nearly half of the original 102 passengers had died during the first winter. As William Bradford wrote, "of these one hundred persons who came over in this first ship together, the greatest half died in the general mortality, and most of them in two or three months' time." Several of the graves on Cole's Hill were uncovered in 1855; their bodies were disinterred and moved to a site near Plymouth Rock.

Governor Carver suddenly died shortly after the Mayflower returned to England. William Bradford was elected to replace him and went on to lead the colony through much of its formative years.

=== Early relations with the Native Americans ===
As promised by Massasoit, numerous Natives arrived at Plymouth throughout the middle of 1621 with pledges of peace. On July 2, a party of Pilgrims led by Edward Winslow (who later became the chief diplomat of the colony) set out to continue negotiations with the chief. The delegation also included Squanto as translator. After traveling for several days, they arrived at Massasoit's village of Sowams near Narragansett Bay. After meals and an exchange of gifts, Massasoit agreed to an exclusive trading pact with the Plymouth colonists. Squanto remained behind and traveled throughout the area to establish trading relations with several tribes.

In late July, a boy named John Billington became lost for some time in the woods around the colony. It was reported that he was found by the Nausets, the tribe on Cape Cod from whom the Pilgrims had stolen corn seed during their first explorations. The colonists organized a party to recover Billington, and they agreed to reimburse the Nausets for the corn in return for the boy. This negotiation did much to secure further peace with the tribes in the area.

During their dealings with the Nausets over the release of John Billington, the Pilgrims learned that Massasoit, Squanto, and several other Wampanoags had been captured by Corbitant, sachem of the Narragansetts. Eager to aid their ally, ten colonists under Myles Standish set out against Corbitant. While hunting for him, they learned that Squanto had escaped and Massasoit was back in power. Standish and his men had injured several Natives, whom they brought to Plymouth for medical attention. The politically astute expedition garnered respect for the Pilgrims, and nine of the most powerful sachems in the area, including Massasoit and Corbitant, signed a treaty in September pledging their loyalty to King James.

==== First Thanksgiving ====
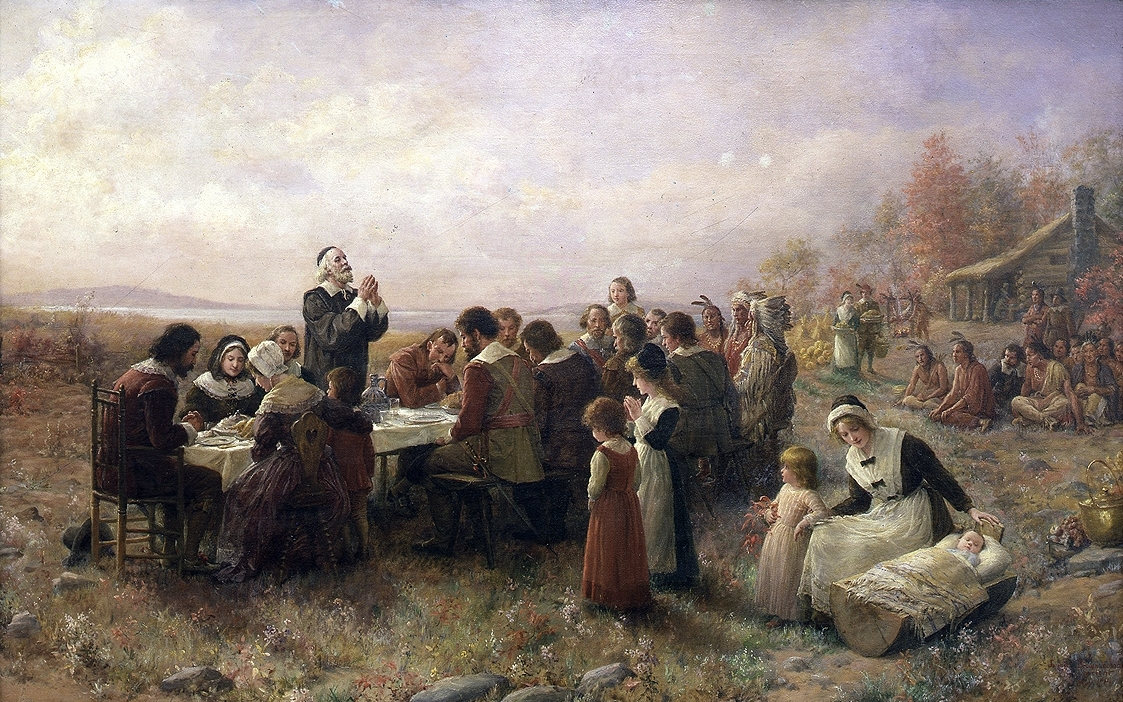
The First Thanksgiving at Plymouth, a 1914 portrait by Jennie Augusta Brownscombe that is now housed in Pilgrim Hall Museum in Plymouth, Massachusetts

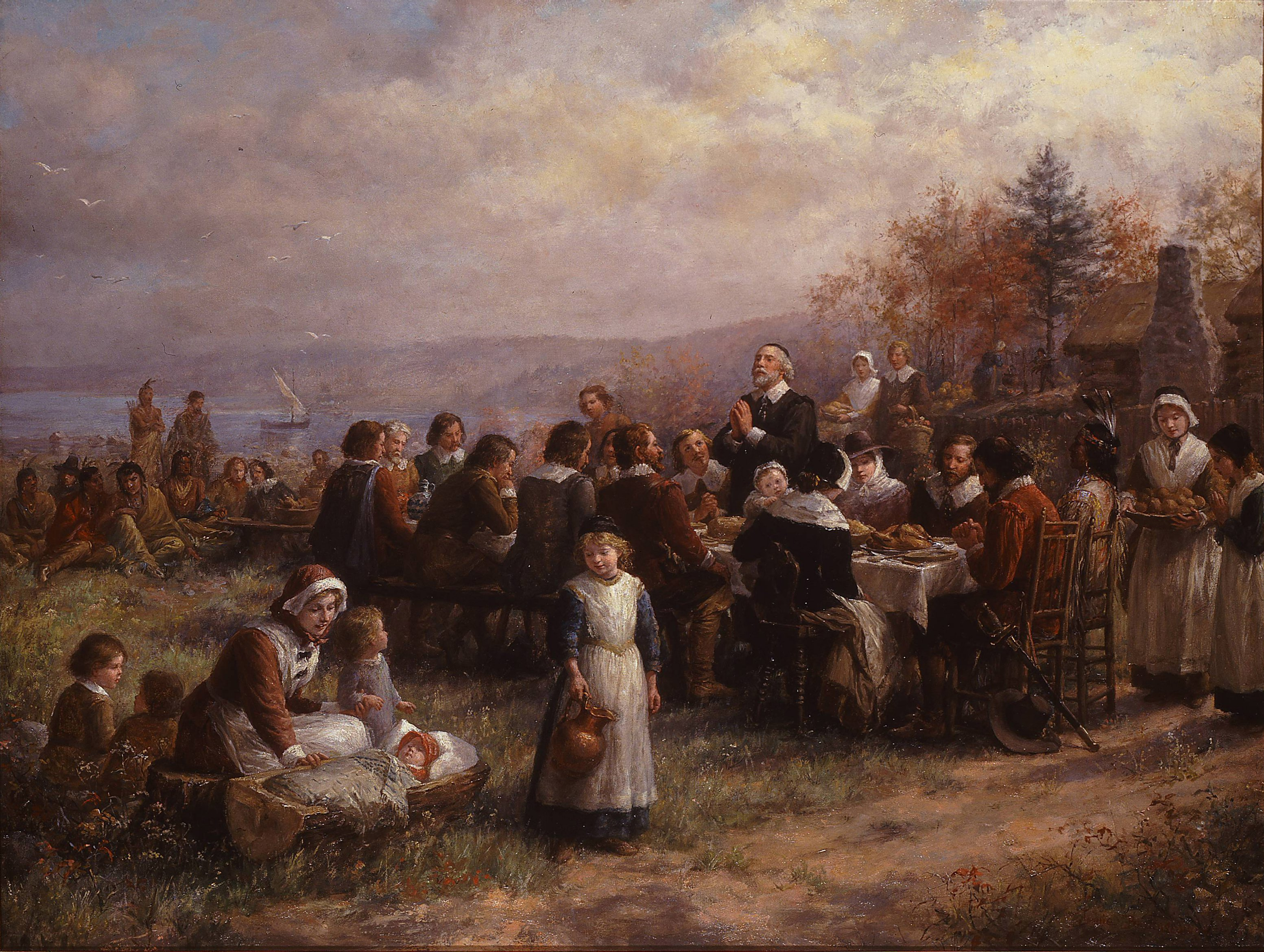
Thanksgiving at Plymouth, a portrait by Jennie Augusta Brownscombe now housed in the National Museum of Women in the Arts in Washington, D.C.

In November 1621, the pilgrims celebrated a feast of thanksgiving which became known in the 19th century as "The First Thanksgiving." The feast was probably held in early October 1621 and was celebrated by the 53 surviving Pilgrims, along with Massasoit and 90 of his men. Three contemporaneous accounts of the event survive: Of Plymouth Plantation by William Bradford, Mourt's Relation probably written by Edward Winslow, and New England's Memorial by Plymouth Colony Secretary (and Bradford's nephew) Capt. Nathaniel Morton. The celebration lasted three days and featured a feast of numerous types of waterfowl, wild turkeys, and fish procured by the colonists, and five deer brought by the Wampanoags.

After the departure of Massasoit and his men, Squanto remained in Plymouth to teach the Pilgrims how to survive in New England, such as using dead fish to fertilize the soil. For the first few years of colonial life, the fur trade was the dominant source of income beyond subsistence farming, buying furs from Natives and selling to Europeans.

In May 1622, a vessel named the Sparrow arrived carrying seven men from the Merchant Adventurers seeking a site for a new settlement in the area. Two ships followed shortly after carrying 60 settlers, all men. They spent July and August in Plymouth before moving north to found a settlement which they named Wessagussett (modern Weymouth). The settlement of Wessagussett was short-lived, but it provided the spark for an event that dramatically changed the political landscape between the local tribes and the settlers.

Reports reached Plymouth of a military threat to Wessagussett, and Myles Standish organized a militia to defend it. Though there had been no attack, Standish decided on a pre-emptive strike, an event which historian Nathaniel Philbrick calls "Standish's raid." He lured two prominent Massachusett military leaders into a house at Wessagussett under the pretense of negotiations, and killed them. Standish and his men pursued Obtakiest, a local sachem, but he escaped with three prisoners from Wessagussett, whom he killed. Wessagussett was disbanded, and the survivors were integrated into the town of Plymouth.

Word quickly spread among the Indigenous tribes of Standish's attack; many abandoned their villages and fled the area. As noted by Philbrick: "Standish's raid had irreparably damaged the human ecology of the region ... It was some time before a new equilibrium came to the region." Edward Winslow reports in his 1624 memoirs Good News from New England that "they forsook their houses, running to and fro like men distracted, living in swamps and other desert places, and so brought manifold diseases amongst themselves, whereof very many are dead." The Pilgrims lost the trade in furs which they had enjoyed with the local tribes, their main source of income to pay their debt to the Merchant Adventurers. The raid had disastrous consequences for the colony, as attested by William Bradford in a letter to the Merchant Adventurers: "we had much damaged our trade, for there where we had most skins the Indians are run away from their habitations." The only positive effect seemed to be the increased power of Massasoit and the Wampanoags, the Pilgrims' closest ally in the region.

=== Growth of Plymouth ===
Historical populations
Date	Pop.
December 1620	99
April 1621	50
November 1621	85
July 1623	180
May 1627	156
January 1630	almost 300
1640	1,020
1643	approx. 2,000
1650	1,566
1660	1,980
1670	5,333
1680	6,400
1690	7,424
1691	approx. 7,000

In November 1621, a Merchant Adventurers ship named Fortune brought 37 new settlers for Plymouth, unexpectedly and without many supplies, putting a strain on the resources of the colony. Among the passengers of the Fortune were several of the original Leiden congregation, including William Brewster's son Jonathan, Edward Winslow's brother John, and Philip Delano (originally "de la Noye"), an ancestor of President Franklin Delano Roosevelt. The ship also carried a letter from the Merchant Adventurers chastising the colony for failure to return a first payment of trade goods with the Mayflower; but the Fortune sailed back laden with £500 worth of goods (equivalent to £76,000 in 2010, or $115,769 at PPP), more than enough to keep the colonists on schedule for repayment of their debt. However, the Fortune was captured by the French before she could deliver her cargo to England, creating an even larger deficit for the colony.

In July 1623, two more ships arrived: the Anne under Captain "Master" William Peirce and Master John Bridges, and the Little James under the command of Captain Emanuel Altham. They carried 96 new settlers, among them Leideners, including William Bradford's future wife Alice along with William and Mary Brewster's daughters Patience and Fear. Some passengers on the Anne were either unprepared for frontier life or undesirable additions to the colony, and they returned to England the next year. According to Gleason Archer, "those who remained were not willing to join the colony under the terms of the agreement with the Merchant Adventurers. They had embarked for America upon an understanding with the Adventurers that they might settle in a community of their own, or at least be free from the bonds by which the Plymouth colonists were enslaved. A letter addressed to the colonists and signed by thirteen of the merchants recited these facts and urged acceptance of the new comers on the specified terms." The new arrivals were allotted land in the area of the Eel River known as Hobs Hole, which became Wellingsley, a mile south of Plymouth Rock.

In September 1623, another ship arrived carrying settlers destined to refound the failed colony at Weymouth, and they stayed temporarily in Plymouth. In March 1624, a ship arrived bearing some additional settlers and the first cattle. A 1627 apportionment of cattle lists 156 colonists divided into 12 lots of 13 colonists each. Another ship arrived in August 1629, also named Mayflower, with 35 additional members of the Leiden congregation. Ships arrived throughout the period between 1629 and 1630 carrying new settlers, though the exact number is unknown; contemporaneous documents indicate that the colony had almost 300 people by January 1630. In 1643, the colony had an estimated 600 males fit for military service, implying a total population of about 2,000. The estimated total population of Plymouth County was 3,055 by 1690, on the eve of the colony's merger with Massachusetts Bay. It is estimated that the entire population of the colony at the point of its dissolution was around 7,000. For comparison, more than 20,000 settlers had arrived in the neighboring Massachusetts Bay Colony between 1630 and 1640 (the Great Migration), and the colonial population of all New England was estimated to be about 60,000 by 1678. Plymouth was the first colony in the region, but it was much smaller than Massachusetts Bay Colony by the time that they merged.

=== Military history ===
==== Myles Standish ====
Myles Standish was the military leader of Plymouth Colony from the beginning. He was officially designated as the captain of the colony's militia in February 1621, shortly after the arrival of the Mayflower in December 1620. He organized and led the first party from the Mayflower to set foot in New England, an exploratory expedition of Cape Cod upon arrival in Provincetown Harbor. He also led the third expedition, during which Standish fired the first recorded shot by the Pilgrim settlers in the event known as the First Encounter. Standish had training in military engineering from the University of Leiden, and it was he who decided the defensive layout of the settlement when they finally arrived at Plymouth. He also organized the able-bodied men into military orders in February of the first winter. During the second winter, he helped design and organize the construction of a large palisade wall surrounding the settlement. Standish led two early military raids on Indigenous villages: the raid to find and punish Corbitant for his attempted coup, and the killing at Wessagussett called "Standish's raid." The former had the desired effect of gaining the respect of the local natives; the latter only served to frighten and scatter them, resulting in loss of trade and income.

==== Pequot War and United Colonies of New England ====
The first major war in New England was the Pequot War of 1637. The war's roots go back to 1632, when a dispute arose between Dutch fur traders and Plymouth officials over control of the Connecticut River Valley near Hartford. Representatives from the Dutch East India Company and Plymouth Colony both had deeds which claimed that they had rightfully purchased the land from the Pequots. A sort of land rush occurred as settlers from Massachusetts Bay and Plymouth colonies tried to beat the Dutch in settling the area. Other tribes in the area sided with the English, including the Narragansetts and Mohegans, traditional enemies of the Pequots. The event that sparked formal hostilities was the capture of a boat and the murder of Captain John Oldham in 1636, an event blamed on allies of the Pequots.

In April 1637, a raid on a Pequot village by John Endicott led to a retaliatory raid by Pequot warriors on the town of Wethersfield, Connecticut, with some 30 English settlers killed. This led to a further retaliatory raid led by Captain John Underhill and Captain John Mason, which burned a Pequot village to the ground in Mystic, killing 300 Pequots. Plymouth Colony had little to do with the actual fighting in the war.

When it appeared that the war would resume, four of the New England colonies (Massachusetts Bay, Connecticut, New Haven, and Plymouth) formed a defensive alliance known as the United Colonies of New England. Edward Winslow, already known for his diplomatic skills, was its chief architect. His experience in the United Provinces of the Netherlands during the Leiden years was key to organizing the confederation. John Adams later considered the United Colonies to be the prototype for the Articles of Confederation, the first attempt at a national American government.

==== King Philip's War ====
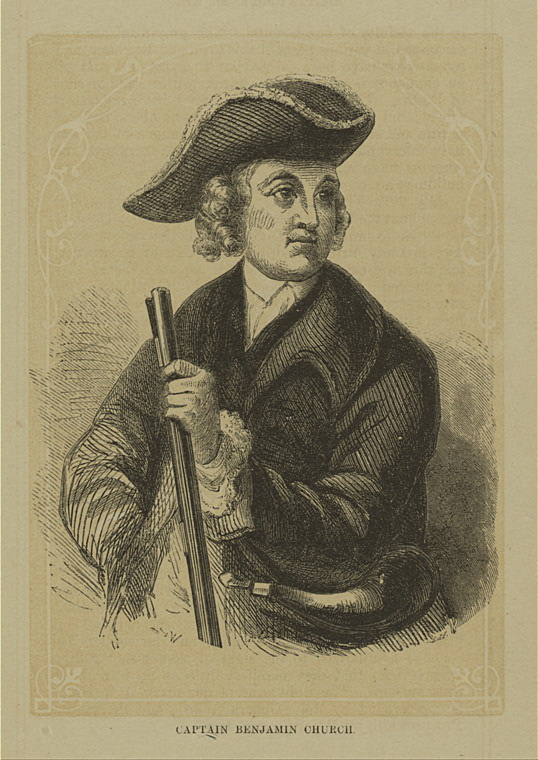
Benjamin Church, considered the father of American ranging

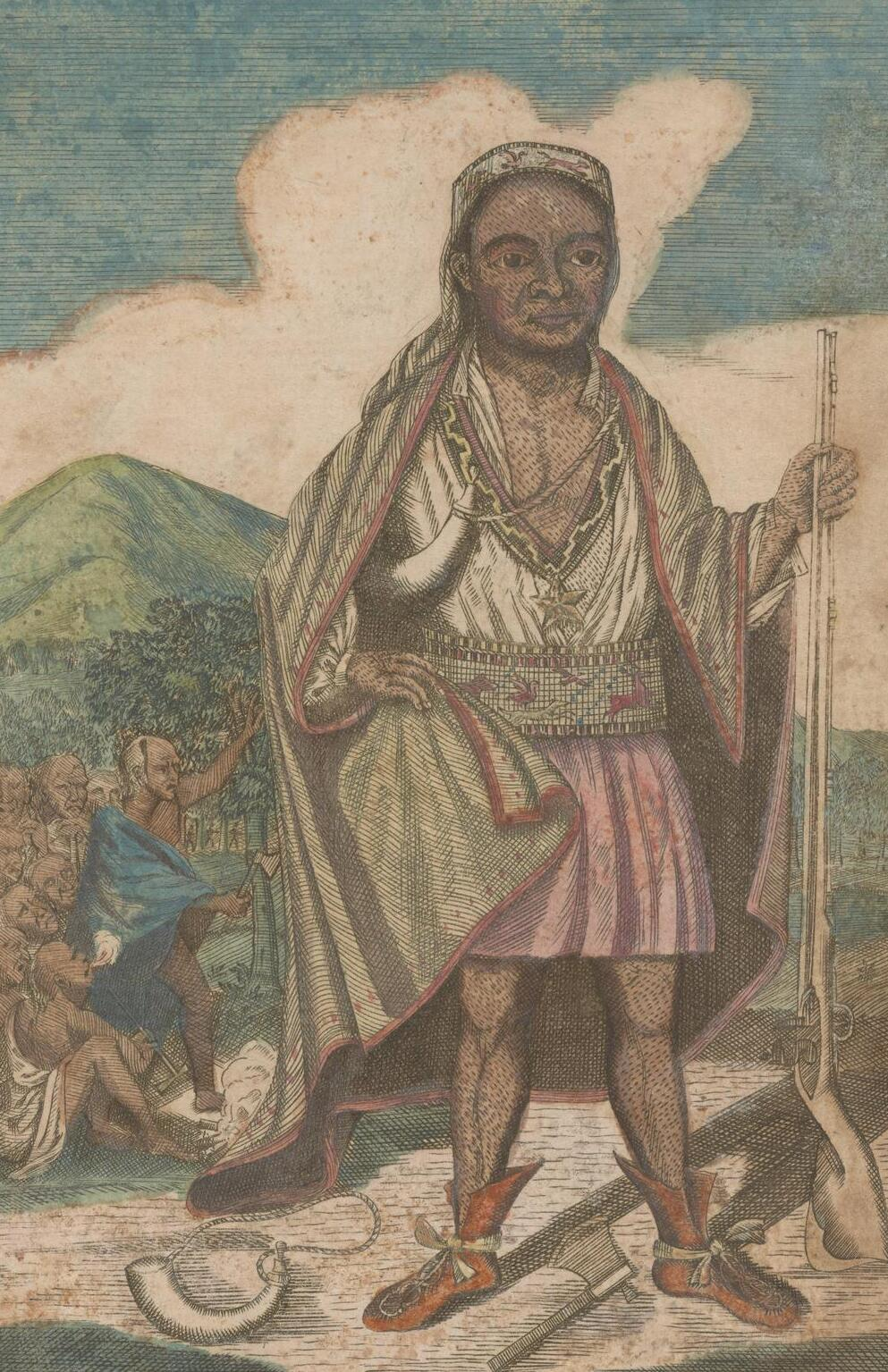
Paul Revere's portrait of King Philip, illustration from Benjamin Church's The Entertaining History of King Philip's War, 1772

Metacomet was the younger son of Massasoit and the heir to Massasoit as sachem of the Pokanokets and supreme leader of the Wampanoags. He was known to the colonists as Philip, and he became sachem in 1662 upon the sudden death of his older brother Wamsutta, known as Alexander.

Native leaders such as Philip resented the colonists' increasing land acquisitions, and they looked for a means to slow or reverse it. Of specific concern was the founding of the town of Swansea, located only a few miles from the Wampanoag capital at Mount Hope. The General Court of Plymouth began using military force to coerce the sale of Wampanoag land to the settlers of the town.

The proximate cause of the conflict was the killing of a Praying Indian named John Sassamon in 1675. Sassamon had been an advisor and friend to Philip before Sassamon's conversion to Christianity had driven the two apart. Some of Philip's most senior lieutenants were accused in the murder. A jury of twelve Englishmen and six Praying Indians found these Wampanoags guilty of murder and sentenced them to death. It is still debated whether King Philip's men actually committed the murder.

Philip had already begun war preparations at his home base near Mount Hope, and he started raiding and pillaging English farms, taking women and children for ransom, including Mary Rowlandson. Governor Josiah Winslow called out the militia, and they began to move on Philip's position.

The war continued through the rest of 1675 and into the next year. The Native American warriors evaded pitched battle, preferring a form of guerrilla warfare that confounded the English. Captain Benjamin Church fervently argued to seek help from friendly Native Americans to learn how to fight against Philip, but he was repeatedly rebuffed by the Plymouth leadership who mistrusted all Native Americans, thinking them potential enemies. Eventually, Governor Winslow and Plymouth military commander Major William Bradford (son of the late Governor William Bradford) relented and gave Church permission to organize a combined force of English and Native Americans. After securing the alliance of the Sakonnets, he led his combined force in pursuit of Philip, who had thus far avoided any major battles. Throughout July 1676, Church's band captured hundreds of Native American warriors, often without much of a fight, though Philip eluded him. Church was given permission to grant amnesty to any captured Native Americans who would agree to join the colonial side, and his force grew immensely. Philip was killed by a Pocasset Indian, and the war soon ended as an overwhelming colonial victory.

Eight percent of the colonial adult male population is estimated to have died during the war, but the impact on the Native Americans was far higher. So many were killed, fled, or shipped off as slaves that the entire Indigenous population of New England fell by 60% to 80%.

=== Final years ===
In 1686, the entire New England region was reorganized by the British Crown under a single government known as the Dominion of New England, incorporating the colonies of Plymouth, Rhode Island, Massachusetts Bay, Connecticut, and New Hampshire. In 1688, New York, West Jersey, and East Jersey were added. The Anglican and Dominion President Edmund Andros was highly unpopular. After news reached Boston in early April 1689 of the Glorious Revolution of 1688, the citizens of Boston rose up and immediately arrested Andros, regimental leaders, and Anglicans, and in Plymouth the local magistrates reclaimed power. The Dominion was dissolved by the end of April 1689, with colonies establishing self-government within months. Andros and other prisoners from the Boston revolt were sent to England in 1690 for trials, but they were all acquitted.

The return of self-rule to Plymouth Colony was short-lived, however. A delegation of New Englanders led by Increase Mather went to England to negotiate a return of the colonial charters that had been nullified during the Dominion years. The situation was particularly problematic for Plymouth Colony, as it had existed without a formal charter since its founding. Plymouth did not get its wish for a formal charter; instead, a new charter was issued combining Plymouth Colony, Massachusetts Bay Colony, and other territories including Maine. The official date of the proclamation was October 17, 1691, legally ending the existence of Plymouth Colony, though it was not put into force until the arrival of the new royal governor Sir William Phips inaugurated the Province of Massachusetts Bay on May 14, 1692. The last official meeting of the Plymouth General Court occurred on June 8, 1692.

== Life ==
=== Religion ===
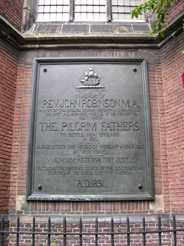
John Robinson's memorial outside of St. Peter's Church in Leiden

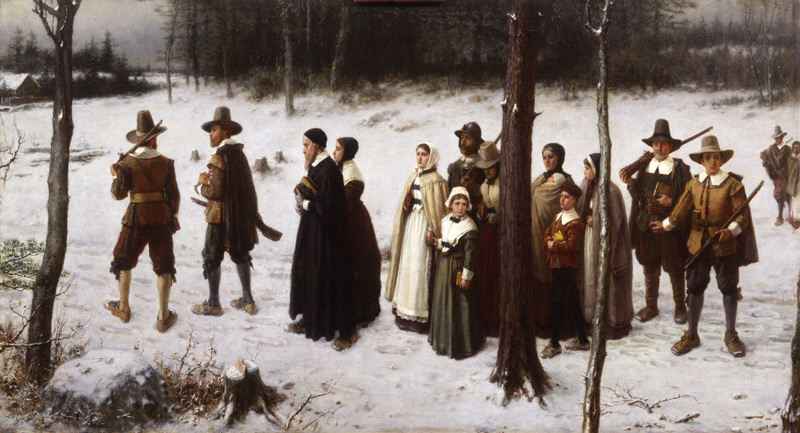
Pilgrims Going to Church, an 1867 portrait by George Henry Boughton

John Robinson was the original pastor of the Scrooby congregation and the religious leader of the separatists throughout the Leiden years. He never actually set foot in New England, but many of his theological pronouncements shaped the nature and character of the Plymouth church. For example, Robinson stated that women and men have different social roles, but neither was lesser in the eyes of God. He taught that men and women have distinct but complementary roles in church, home, and society as a whole, and he referred to women as the "weaker vessel," quoting from 1 Peter 3:7. In matters of religious understanding, he proclaimed that it was the man's role to "guide and go before" women.

The Pilgrims themselves were separatist Puritans, Protestant Christians who separated from the Church of England. They sought to practice Christianity as was done in the times of the Apostles. Following Martin Luther's and John Calvin's Reformation, they believed that the Bible was the only true source of religious teaching and that any additions made to Christianity had no place in Christian practice, especially with regard to church traditions such as clerical vestments or the use of Latin in church services. In particular, they were strongly opposed to the Anglicans' episcopal form of church government. They believed that the church was a community of Christians who made a covenant with God and with one another. Their congregations had a democratic structure. Ministers, teachers, and lay church elders were elected by and responsible to the entire congregation. Each congregation was independent of all the others and directly subject to Christ's government, hence the name Congregationalism. The Pilgrims distinguished themselves from another branch of Puritans in that they sought to separate themselves from the Anglican Church, rather than reform it from within. It was this desire to worship from outside of the Anglican Communion that led them first to the Netherlands and ultimately to New England.

Each town in the colony was considered a single church congregation; in later years, some of the larger towns split into two or three congregations. Church attendance was mandatory for all residents of the colony, while church membership was restricted to those who had converted to the faith. In Plymouth Colony, it seems that a simple profession of faith was all that was required for acceptance as a member. This was a more liberal doctrine than the congregations of the Massachusetts Bay Colony, where it was common to conduct detailed interviews with those seeking formal membership. There was no central governing body for the churches. Each individual congregation was left to determine its own standards of membership, hire its own ministers, and conduct its own business.

The church was the most important social institution in the colony. The Bible was the primary religious document of the society, and it also served as the primary legal document. Church membership was socially vital. Education was carried out for religious purposes, motivated by a determination to teach the next generation how to read the Bible. The laws of the colony specifically asked parents to provide for the education of their children, "at least to be able duly to read the Scriptures" and to understand "the main Grounds and Principles of Christian Religion." It was expected that the male head of the household would be responsible for the religious well-being of all its members, children and servants alike.

Most churches used two acts to sanction its members: censure and being "put out." Censure was a formal reprimand for behavior that did not conform with accepted religious and social norms, while being "put out" meant to be removed from church membership. Many social breaches were dealt with through church discipline rather than through civil punishment, from fornication to public drunkenness. Church sanctions seldom held official recognition outside church membership and seldom resulted in civil or criminal proceedings. Nevertheless, such sanctions were a powerful tool of social stability.

The Pilgrims practiced infant baptism. The public baptism ceremony was usually performed within six months of birth. Marriage was considered a civil ceremony, rather than a religious one. The Pilgrims saw this arrangement as biblical, there being no evidence from Scripture that a minister should preside over a wedding.

Besides the theology espoused by their religious leaders, the people of Plymouth Colony had a strong belief in the supernatural. Richard Greenham was a Puritan theologian whose works were known to the Plymouth residents, and he counseled extensively against turning to magic or wizardry to solve problems. Massachusetts Bay Colony experienced an outbreak of witchcraft scares in the 17th century, but there is no evidence that Plymouth was engulfed in anything similar. Witchcraft was listed as a capital crime in the 1636 codification of the laws by the Plymouth General Court, but there were no actual convictions of witches in Plymouth Colony. The court records only show two formal accusations of witchcraft. The first was of Goodwife Holmes in 1661, but it never went to trial. The second was of Mary Ingram in 1677, which resulted in trial and acquittal.

=== Marriage and family life ===
Edward Winslow and Susanna White both lost their spouses during the harsh winter of 1620–1621, and the two became the first couple to be married in Plymouth. Governor Bradford presided over the civil ceremony.

In Plymouth Colony, "courtships were usually initiated by the young people themselves, but as a relationship progressed toward something more permanent, the parents became more directly involved," according to John Putnam Demos. Parents were concerned with the moral and religious qualities of the proposed spouse, as well as the financial means of each party's family. The first step toward marriage was generally a betrothal or pre-contract, a ceremony carried out before two witnesses in which the couple pledged to wed in due time. The couple's intentions were published several weeks or months after the betrothal was contracted. "A betrothed couple was considered to have a special status, not married but no longer unmarried either." Sexual contact was prohibited between a betrothed couple, but the penalty for it was one-fourth of what it was for single persons, and records indicate a relatively high number of babies born less than nine months after a wedding ceremony.

Women in Plymouth Colony had more extensive legal and social rights compared to 17th-century European norms. They were considered equal to men before God from the perspective of the Church. Women were, however, expected to take traditionally feminine roles, such as child-rearing and maintaining the household. Plymouth women enjoyed extensive property and legal rights and could be signatories on contracts. A wife in Plymouth could not be "written out" of her husband's will and was guaranteed a full third of the family's property upon his death. In some cases, especially in second marriages, women were given exclusive right to retain control of their property separately from their husbands. Women were also known to occasionally sit on juries in Plymouth, a remarkable circumstance in 17th-century legal practice. Historians James and Patricia Scott Deetz cite a 1678 inquest into the death of Anne Batson's child, where the jury was composed of five women and seven men.

Family size in the colony was large by modern American standards, (Note: By the third generation, the average family had 9.3 births, with 7.9 children living until adulthood. Most families had two parents, so this would extrapolate to an average of 10 people under one roof.) though childbirth was often spaced out, with an average of two years between children. Most families averaged five to six children living under the same roof, though it was not uncommon for one family to have grown children moving out before the mother had finished giving birth. Maternal mortality rates were fairly high; one birth in 30 ended in the death of the mother, resulting in one in five women dying in childbirth. However, "the rate of infant mortality in Plymouth seems to have been relatively low."

=== Childhood, adolescence, and education ===
Children generally remained in the direct care of their mothers until about the age of 8, after which it was not uncommon for the child to be placed in the foster care of another family. Some children were placed into households to learn a trade, others to be taught to read and write. It was assumed that children's own parents would love them too much and would not properly discipline them. By placing children in the care of another family, there was little danger of them being spoiled.

Adolescence was not a recognized phase of life in Plymouth colony, and there was no rite of passage which marked transition from youth to adulthood. Several important transitions occurred at various ages, but none marked a single "coming of age" event. Children were expected to begin learning their adult roles in life quite early by taking on some of the family work or by being placed in foster homes to learn a trade. Orphaned children were given the right to choose their own guardians at age 14. At 16, males became eligible for military duty and were also considered adults for legal purposes, such as standing trial for crimes. Age 21 was the youngest at which a male could become a freeman, though for practical purposes this occurred some time in a man's mid-twenties. Twenty-one was the assumed age of inheritance, as well, although the law respected the rights of the deceased to name an earlier age in his will.

Actual schools were rare in Plymouth colony. The first true school was not founded until 40 years after the foundation of the colony. The General Court first authorized colony-wide funding for formal public schooling in 1673, but only the town of Plymouth made use of these funds at that time. By 1683, though, five additional towns had received this funding.

Education of the young was never considered to be the primary domain of schools, even after they had become more common. Most education was carried out by a child's parents or foster parents. Formal apprenticeships were not the norm in Plymouth; it was expected that a foster family would teach the children whatever trades they themselves practiced. The church also played a central role in a child's education. As noted above, the primary purpose of teaching children to read was so that they could read the Bible for themselves.

== Government and laws ==
=== Organization ===
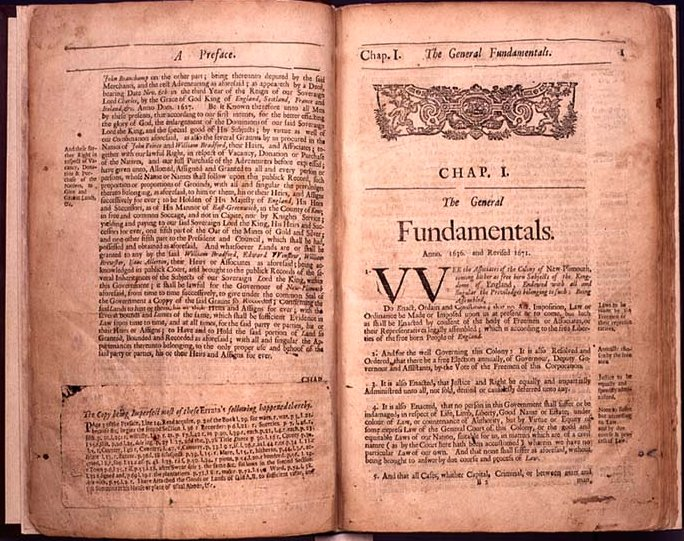
The Book of the General Laws of the Inhabitants of the Jurisdiction of New-Plimouth, Boston a 1685 book by Samuel Green

Plymouth Colony did not have a royal charter authorizing it to form a government, yet some means of governance was needed. The Mayflower Compact was the colony's first governing document, signed by the 41 Puritan men aboard the Mayflower upon their arrival in Provincetown Harbor on November 21, 1620. Formal laws were not codified until 1636. The colony's laws were based on a hybrid of English common law and religious law as laid out in the Bible. The colonial authorities were deeply influenced by Calvinist theology, and were convinced that democracy was the form of government mandated by God.

The colony offered nearly all adult males potential citizenship. Full citizens, or freemen, were accorded full rights and privileges in areas such as voting and holding office. To be considered a freeman, adult males had to be sponsored by an existing freeman and accepted by the General Court. Later restrictions established a one-year waiting period between nominating and granting of freeman status, and also placed religious restrictions on the colony's citizens, specifically preventing Quakers from becoming freemen. Freeman status was also restricted by age; the official minimum age was 21, although in practice most men were elevated to freeman status between the ages of 25 and 40, averaging somewhere in their early thirties. The colony established a disabled veterans' fund in 1636 to support veterans who returned from service with disabilities. In 1641, the Body of Liberties developed protections for people who were unable to perform public service. In 1660, the colonial government restricted voting with a specified property qualification, and they restricted it further in 1671 to only freemen who were "orthodox in the fundamentals of religion."

Governors of Plymouth Colony
Dates	Governor
1620	John Carver
1621–1632	William Bradford
1633	Edward Winslow
1634	Thomas Prence
1635	William Bradford
1636	Edward Winslow
1637	William Bradford
1638	Thomas Prence
1639–1643	William Bradford
1644	Edward Winslow
1645–1656	William Bradford
1657–1672	Thomas Prence
1673–1679	Josiah Winslow
1680–1692	Thomas Hinckley

The colony's most powerful executive was its Governor, who was originally elected by the freemen but was later appointed by the General Court in an annual election. The General Court also elected seven Assistants to form a cabinet to assist the Governor. The Governor and Assistants then appointed Constables who served as the chief administrators for the towns, and Messengers who were the main civil servants of the colony. They were responsible for publishing announcements, performing land surveys, carrying out executions, and a host of other duties.

The General Court was the chief legislative and judicial body of the colony. It was elected by the freemen from among their own number and met regularly in Plymouth, the capital town of the colony. As part of its judicial duties, it would periodically call a Grand Enquest, which was a grand jury of sorts elected from the freemen, who would hear complaints and swear out indictments for credible accusations. The General Court, and later lesser town and county courts, would preside over trials of accused criminals and over civil matters, but the ultimate decisions were made by a jury of freemen.

The General Court as the legislative and judicial bodies, and the Governor as the chief executive of the colony constituted a political system of division of power. It followed a recommendation in John Calvin's political theory to set up several institutions which complement and control each other in a system of checks and balances in order to minimize the misuse of political power. In 1625, the settlers had repaid their debts and thus gained complete possession of the colony. The colony was a de facto republic, since neither an English company nor the King and Parliament exerted any influence – a representative democracy governed on the principles of the Mayflower Compact ("self-rule").

=== Laws ===
As a legislative body, the General Court could make proclamations of law as needed. These laws were not formally compiled anywhere in the early years of the colony; they were first organized and published in the 1636 Book of Laws. The book was reissued in 1658, 1672, and 1685. These laws included the levying of "rates" or taxes and the distribution of colony lands. The General Court established townships as a means of providing local government over settlements, but reserved for itself the right to control specific distribution of land to individuals within those towns. When new land was granted to a freeman, it was directed that only the person to whom the land was granted was allowed to settle it. It was forbidden for individual settlers to purchase land from Native Americans without formal permission from the General Court. The government recognized the precarious peace that existed with the Wampanoag, and wished to avoid antagonizing them by buying up all of their land.

The laws also set out crimes and their associated punishment. There were several crimes that carried the death penalty: treason, murder, witchcraft, arson, sodomy, rape, bestiality, adultery, and cursing or smiting one's parents. The actual exercise of the death penalty was fairly rare; only one sex-related crime resulted in execution, a 1642 incidence of bestiality by Thomas Granger. Edward Bumpus was sentenced to death for "striking and abusing his parents" in 1679, but his sentence was commuted to a severe whipping by reason of insanity. Perhaps the most notable use of the death penalty was in the execution of the Native Americans convicted of the murder of John Sassamon; this helped lead to King Philip's War. Though nominally a capital crime, adultery was usually dealt with by public humiliation only. Convicted adulterers were often forced to wear the letters "A.D." sewn into their garments, much in the manner of Hester Prynne in Nathaniel Hawthorne's later novel The Scarlet Letter.

Several laws dealt with indentured servitude, a legal status whereby a person would work off debts or be given training in exchange for a period of unrecompensed service. The law required that all indentured servants had to be registered by the Governor or one of the Assistants, and that no period of indenture could be less than six months. Further laws forbade a master from shortening the length of time of service required for his servant, and also confirmed that any indentured servants whose period of service began in England would still be required to complete their service while in Plymouth.

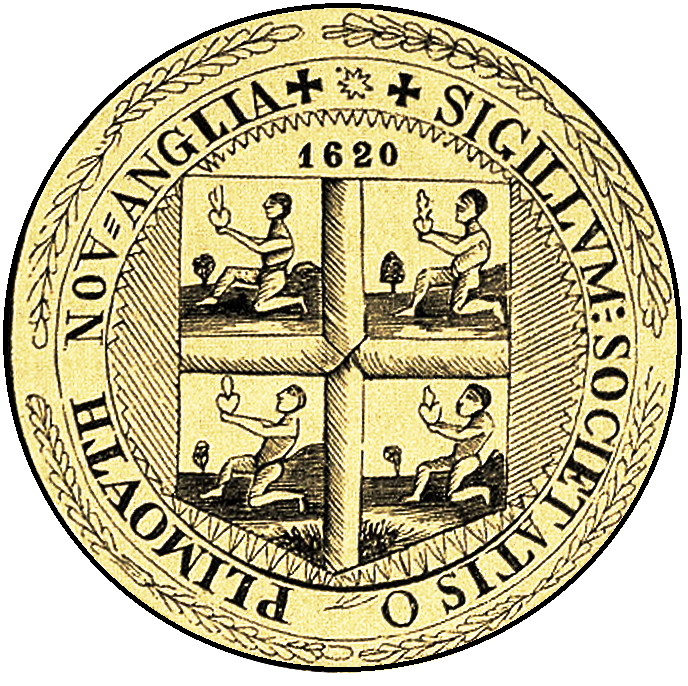
Plymouth Colony seal

=== Official seal ===
The seal of the Plymouth Colony was designed in 1629 and is still used by the town of Plymouth. It depicts four figures within a shield bearing St George's Cross, each carrying the burning heart symbol of John Calvin. The seal was also used by the County of Plymouth until 1931.

== Geography ==
=== Boundaries ===
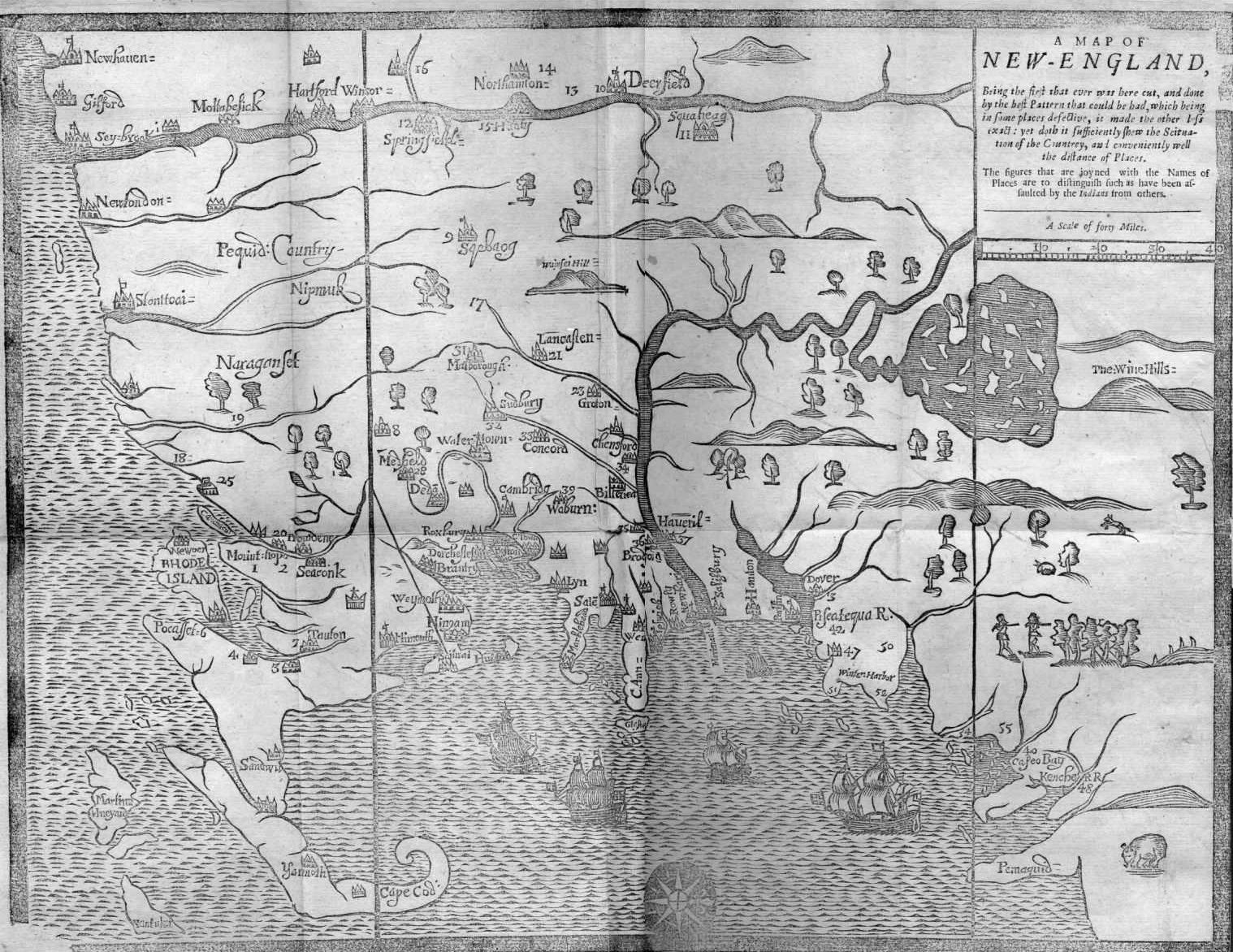
1677 map of New England by William Hubbard showing the location of Plymouth Colony. The map is oriented with west at the top.

Without a clear land patent for the area, the settlers settled without a charter to form a government and, as a result, it was often unclear in the early years what land was under the colony's jurisdiction. In 1644, "The Old Colony Line" – which had been surveyed in 1639 – was formally accepted as the boundary between Massachusetts Bay and Plymouth.

The situation was more complicated along the border with Rhode Island. Roger Williams settled in the area of Rehoboth in 1636, near modern Pawtucket. He was forcibly evicted in order to maintain Plymouth's claim to the area. Williams moved to the west side of the Pawtucket River to found the settlement of Providence, the nucleus for the colony of Rhode Island, which was formally established with the "Providence Plantations Patent" of 1644. Various settlers from both Rhode Island and Plymouth began to settle along the area, and the exact nature of the western boundary of Plymouth became unclear. The issue was not fully resolved until the 1740s, long after the dissolution of Plymouth Colony itself. Rhode Island had received a patent for the area in 1693, which had been disputed by Massachusetts Bay Colony. Rhode Island successfully defended the patent, and a royal decree in 1746 confirmed Rhode Island's territory along the eastern shore of the Narragansett Bay, including the mainland portion of Newport County and all of modern Bristol County, Rhode Island. The border itself continued to be contested by Massachusetts, first as a colony and later as a state, until as late as 1898, when the boundary was settled and ratified by both states.

=== Counties and towns ===
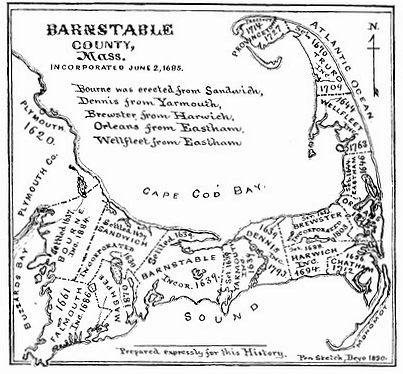
1890 map of Barnstable County, Massachusetts, showing the location and dates of incorporation of towns

For most of its history, the town was the primary administrative unit and political division of the colony. Plymouth Colony was not formally divided into counties until June 2, 1685, during the reorganization that led to the formation of the Dominion of New England. Three counties were composed of the following towns. (Note: Deetz lists twenty towns as part of Plymouth Colony. In addition to the ones listed here, they include the towns of Edgartown and Tisbury on Martha's Vineyard, and Nantucket on its namesake island. However, several other sources note that Martha's Vineyard (Dukes County) and Nantucket Island (Nantucket County) were part of the Colony of New York prior to the Dominion (including the 1890 Massachusetts Gazetteer used here) and were not formally annexed until the 1691 charter that ended Plymouth Colony as an independent entity. Some towns north of the "Old Colony Line" may have been founded by Plymouth settlers or were temporarily administered as part of Plymouth Colony before the boundary was established with Massachusetts in 1644, such as Hull and Wessagussett.)

Barnstable County on Cape Cod:

- Barnstable, the shire town (county seat) of the county, first settled in 1639 and incorporated 1650.
- Eastham, site of the "First Encounter," first settled 1644 and incorporated as the town of Nauset in 1646, name changed to Eastham in 1651.
- Falmouth, first settled in 1661 and incorporated as Succonesset in 1686.
- Rochester, settled 1638, incorporated 1686.
- Sandwich, first settled in 1637 and incorporated in 1639.
- Yarmouth, originally named Mattacheese by the Native Americans, it was named for a seaport at the mouth of the Yar river in England and incorporated in 1639.

Bristol County along the shores of Buzzards Bay and Narragansett Bay; part of this county was later ceded to Rhode Island:

- Taunton, the shire town of the county, incorporated in 1639 and grew due to the early discovery of bog iron.
- Bristol, incorporated in 1680 and including the former locations of Sowams and Montaup (Mount Hope), which were Massasoit's and King Philip's capitals, respectively. Ceded to Rhode Island in 1746 and is now part of Bristol County, Rhode Island.
- Dartmouth, incorporated in 1664. Dartmouth was the site of a significant massacre by the native forces during King Philip's War. It was also the location of a surrender of a group of some 160 of Philip's forces who were later sold into slavery.
- Freetown, originally known as "Assonet" to the natives, and "Freemen's Land" by its first settlers. Settlement records are lost however it was incorporated under its current name in July 1683.
- Little Compton, incorporated as Sakonnet in 1682, ceded to Rhode Island in 1746 and is now part of Newport County, Rhode Island.
- Rehoboth, first settled in 1644 and incorporated in 1645. Nearby to, but distinct from the Rehoboth settlement of Roger Williams, which is now the town of Pawtucket, Rhode Island.
- Swansea, founded as the township of Wannamoiset in 1667, incorporated as the town of Swansea in 1668. It was here that the first English casualty occurred in King Philip's War. (Note: Some confusion exists over the correct spelling of Swansea. The modern spelling is used here. Various records have listed the town as Swansea, Swanzey, Swanzea, and Swansey)

Plymouth County, located along the western shores of Cape Cod Bay:

- Plymouth, the shire town of the county and capital of the colony. This was the original 1620 settlement of the Mayflower Pilgrims, and continued as the largest and most significant settlement in the colony until its dissolution in 1691.
- Bridgewater, purchased from Massasoit by Myles Standish, and originally named Duxburrow New Plantation, it was incorporated as Bridgewater in 1656.
- Duxbury, founded by Myles Standish, was incorporated in 1637. Other notable residents of Duxbury included John Alden, William Brewster, and Governor Thomas Prence.
- Marshfield, settled in 1632, incorporated in 1640. Home to Governor Edward Winslow. Also home to Josiah Winslow, who was the Governor of the colony during King Philip's War, and to Peregrine White, the first English child born in New England.
- Middleborough, incorporated in 1669 as Middleberry. Named for its location as the halfway point on the journey from Plymouth to Mount Hope, the Wampanoag capital.
- Scituate, settled in 1628 and incorporated in 1636. The town was the site of a major attack by King Philip's forces in 1676.

== Demographics ==
=== English ===
The settlers of Plymouth Colony fit broadly into three categories: Pilgrims, Strangers, and Particulars. The Pilgrims were a Puritan group who closely followed the teachings of John Calvin, like the later founders of Massachusetts Bay Colony to the north. (The difference was that the Massachusetts Bay Puritans hoped to reform the Anglican church from within, whereas the Pilgrims saw it as a morally defunct organization and removed themselves from it.) The name "Pilgrims" was actually not used by the settlers themselves. William Bradford used the term to describe the group, but he was using it generically to define them as travelers on a religious mission. The Pilgrims referred to themselves as the Saints, First Comers, Ancient Brethren, or Ancient Men. They used such terms to indicate their place as God's elect, as they subscribed to the Calvinist belief in predestination. "The First Comers" was a term more loosely used in their day to refer to any of the Mayflower passengers. There were also a number of indentured servants among the colonists. Indentured servants were mostly poor children whose families were receiving church relief and "homeless waifs from the streets of London sent as laborers."

In addition to the Pilgrims, the Mayflower carried "Strangers," the non-Puritan settlers placed on the Mayflower by the Merchant Adventurers who provided various skills needed to establish a colony. This also included later settlers who came for other reasons throughout the history of the colony and who did not adhere to the Pilgrim religious ideals. A third group known as the "Particulars" consisted of later settlers who paid their own "particular" way to America, and thus were not obligated to pay the colony's debts.

The presence of outsiders such as the Strangers and the Particulars was a considerable annoyance to the Pilgrims. As early as 1623, a conflict broke out between the Pilgrims and the Strangers over the celebration of Christmas, a day of no particular significance to the Pilgrims. Furthermore, a group of Strangers founded the nearby settlement of Wessagussett and the Pilgrims were highly strained by their lack of discipline, both emotionally and in terms of resources. They looked at the eventual failure of the Wessagussett settlement as Divine Providence against a sinful people. The residents of Plymouth also used terms to distinguish between the earliest settlers of the colony and those who came later. The first generation of settlers called themselves the Old Comers or Planters, those who arrived before 1627. Later generations of Plymouth residents referred to this group as the Forefathers.

Historian John Demos did a demographic study in A Little Commonwealth (1970). He reports that the colony's average household grew from 7.8 children per family for first-generation families to 8.6 children for second-generation families and to 9.3 for third-generation families. Child mortality also decreased over this time, with 7.2 children born to first-generation families living until their 21st birthday. That number increased to 7.9 children by the third generation. Life expectancy was higher for men than for women. Of the men who survived until age 21, the average life expectancy was 69.2 years. Over 55% of these men lived past 70; less than 15% died before the age of 50. The numbers were much lower for women owing to the difficulties of childbearing. The average life expectancy of women at the age of 21 was 62.4 years. Of these women, fewer than 45% lived past 70, and about 30% died before the age of 50.

During King Philip's War, Plymouth Colony lost eight percent of its adult male population. By the end of the war, one-third of New England's approximately 100 towns had been burned and abandoned, and this had a significant demographic effect on the population of New England.

=== Native Americans ===
The Native Americans in New England were organized into loose tribal confederations, sometimes referred to as nations. Among these confederations were the Nipmucks, the Massachusetts, the Narragansetts, the Niantics, the Mohegans, and the Wampanoags. Several significant events dramatically altered the demographics of the Indigenous population in the region. The first was "Standish's raid" on Wessagussett, which frightened Indigenous leaders to the extent that many abandoned their settlements, resulting in many deaths through starvation and disease. The second was the Pequot War, which resulted in the dissolution of the Pequot tribe and a major shift in the local power structure. The third was King Philip's War which had the most dramatic effect on local populations, resulting in the death or displacement of as much as 80 percent of the total number of southern New England Natives and the enslavement and forced displacement of thousands to the Caribbean and other locales.

=== Black and Indigenous slaves ===
Some of the wealthier families in Plymouth Colony enslaved Black people and Native Americans. Colonists considered slaves to be the property of their owners, able to be passed on to heirs, unlike indentured servants. Slave ownership was not widespread and very few families possessed the wealth necessary to acquire slaves. In 1674, the inventory of Capt. Thomas Willet of Marshfield includes "8 Negroes" at a value of £200. In the July 29, 1680, codicil to the will of Peter Worden of Yarmouth, he bequeathed ownership of his "Indian servant" to his wife Mary, to be passed on to their son Samuel upon her decease. The unnamed slave was dutifully recorded in the January 21, 1681, inventory of Worden's estate at the original purchase price of £4 10s. Other inventories of the time valued "Negro" slaves at £24–25 each (equivalent to £2,673 in 2010, or $4,100 at PPP), well out of the financial ability of most families. A 1689 census of the town of Bristol shows that, of the 70 families that lived there, only one owned a Black slave. So few were Black and Indigenous slaves in the colony that the General Court never saw fit to pass any laws dealing with them.

== Economy ==
The largest source of wealth for Plymouth Colony was the fur trade. The disruption of this trade caused by Myles Standish's raid at Wessagussett created great hardship for the colonists for many years and was directly cited by William Bradford as a contributing factor to the economic difficulties in their early years. The colonists attempted to supplement their income by fishing; the waters in Cape Cod bay were known to be excellent fisheries. However, they lacked any skill in this area, and it did little to relieve their economic hardship. The colony traded throughout the region, establishing trading posts as far away as Penobscot, Maine. They were also frequent trading partners with the Dutch at New Amsterdam.

The economic situation improved with the arrival of cattle in the colony. It is unknown when the first cattle arrived, but the division of land for the grazing of cattle in 1627 represented one of the first moves towards private land ownership in the colony. (Note: There was a division of land in 1623 and a division (allotment) of cattle in 1627. See "Colonial Key Documents in Plymouth Colony Research", Plimoth Plantation™ and the New England Historic Genealogical Society®, n.d. Retrieved September 3, 2018.) Cattle became an important source of wealth in the colony; the average cow could sell for £28 in 1638 (£3,300 in 2010, or $5,000 at parity). However, the flood of immigrants during the Great Migration drove down the price of cattle. The same cows sold at £28 in 1638 were valued in 1640 at only £5 (£680.00 in 2010, or $1,040 at parity). Besides cattle, there were also pigs, sheep, and goats raised in the colony.

Agriculture also made up an important part of the Plymouth economy. The colonists adopted native agricultural practices and crops. They planted maize, squash, and beans. Besides the crops themselves, the Pilgrims learned productive farming techniques from the natives, such as proper crop rotation and the use of dead fish to fertilize the soil. In addition to these native crops, the colonists also successfully planted Old World crops such as turnips, carrots, peas, wheat, barley, and oats.

Overall, there was little cash in Plymouth Colony, so most wealth was accumulated in the form of possessions. Trade goods such as furs, fish, and livestock were subject to fluctuations in price and were unreliable repositories of wealth. Durable goods represented an important source of economic stability for the residents, such as fine wares, clothes, and furnishings. In 1652, the Massachusetts General Court authorized Boston silversmith John Hull to produce local coinage in shilling, sixpence, and threepence denominations to address a coin shortage in the colony. To that point, the colony's economy had been entirely dependent on barter and foreign currency, including English, Spanish, Dutch, Portuguese, and counterfeit coins. In 1661, after the restoration of the monarchy, the English government considered the Boston mint to be treasonous. However, the colony ignored the English demands to cease operations until at least 1682, when Hull's contract expired, and the colony did not move to renew his contract or appoint a new mint master. The coinage was a contributing factor to the revocation of the Massachusetts Bay Colony charter in 1684.

== Legacy ==
The events surrounding the founding and history of Plymouth Colony have had a lasting effect on the art, traditions, mythology, and politics of the United States of America, despite the colony's short existence of less than 72 years.

=== Art, literature, and film ===
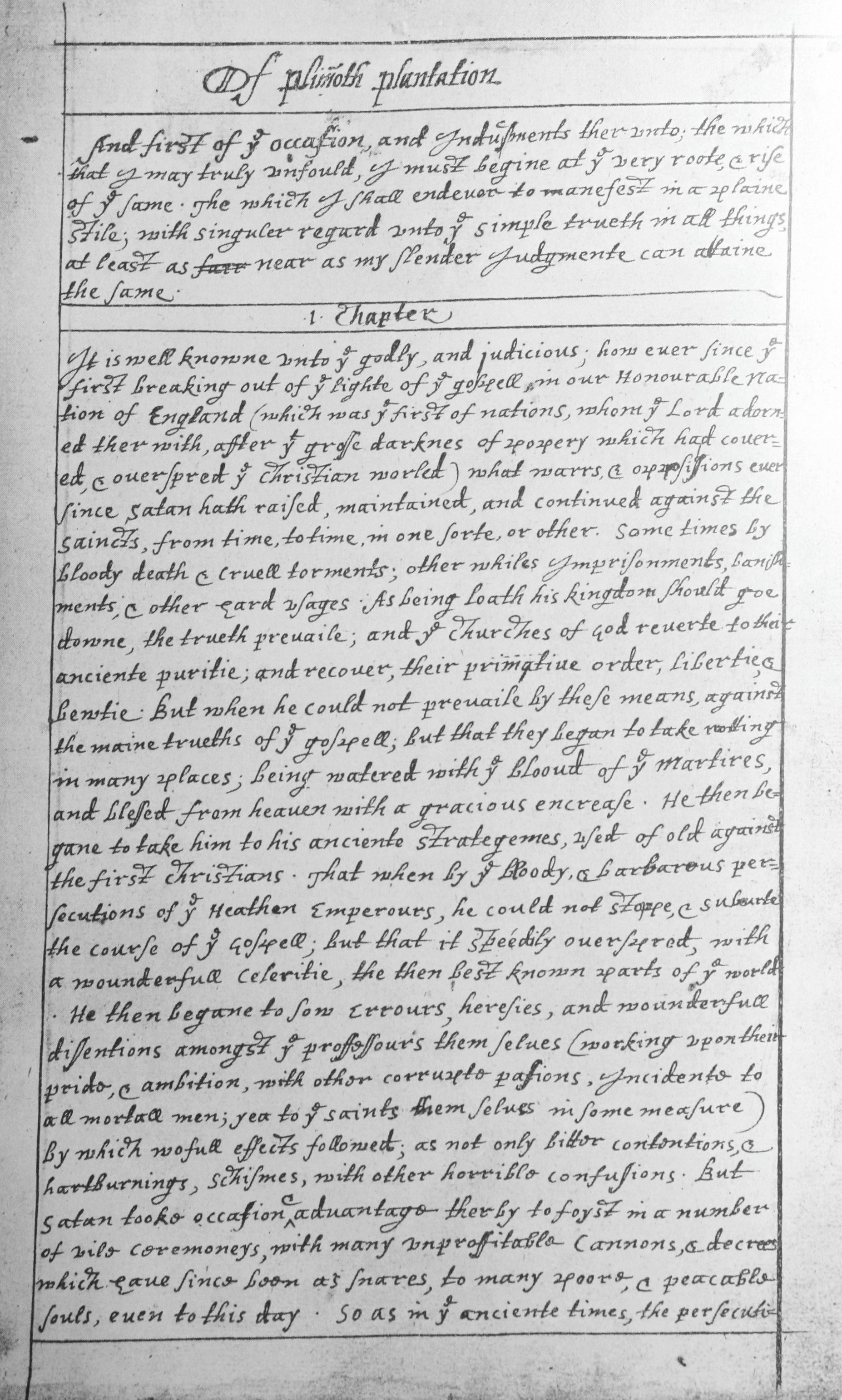
Front page of William Bradford's manuscript for Of Plimoth Plantation

The earliest artistic depiction of the Pilgrims was actually done before their arrival in America; Dutch painter Adam Willaerts painted a portrait of their departure from Delfshaven in 1620. The same scene was repainted by Robert Walter Weir in 1844, and hangs in the Rotunda of the United States Capitol building. Numerous other paintings have been created memorializing various scenes from the life of Plymouth Colony, including their landing and the "First Thanksgiving," many of which have been collected by Pilgrim Hall, a museum and historical society founded in 1824 to preserve the history of the Colony.

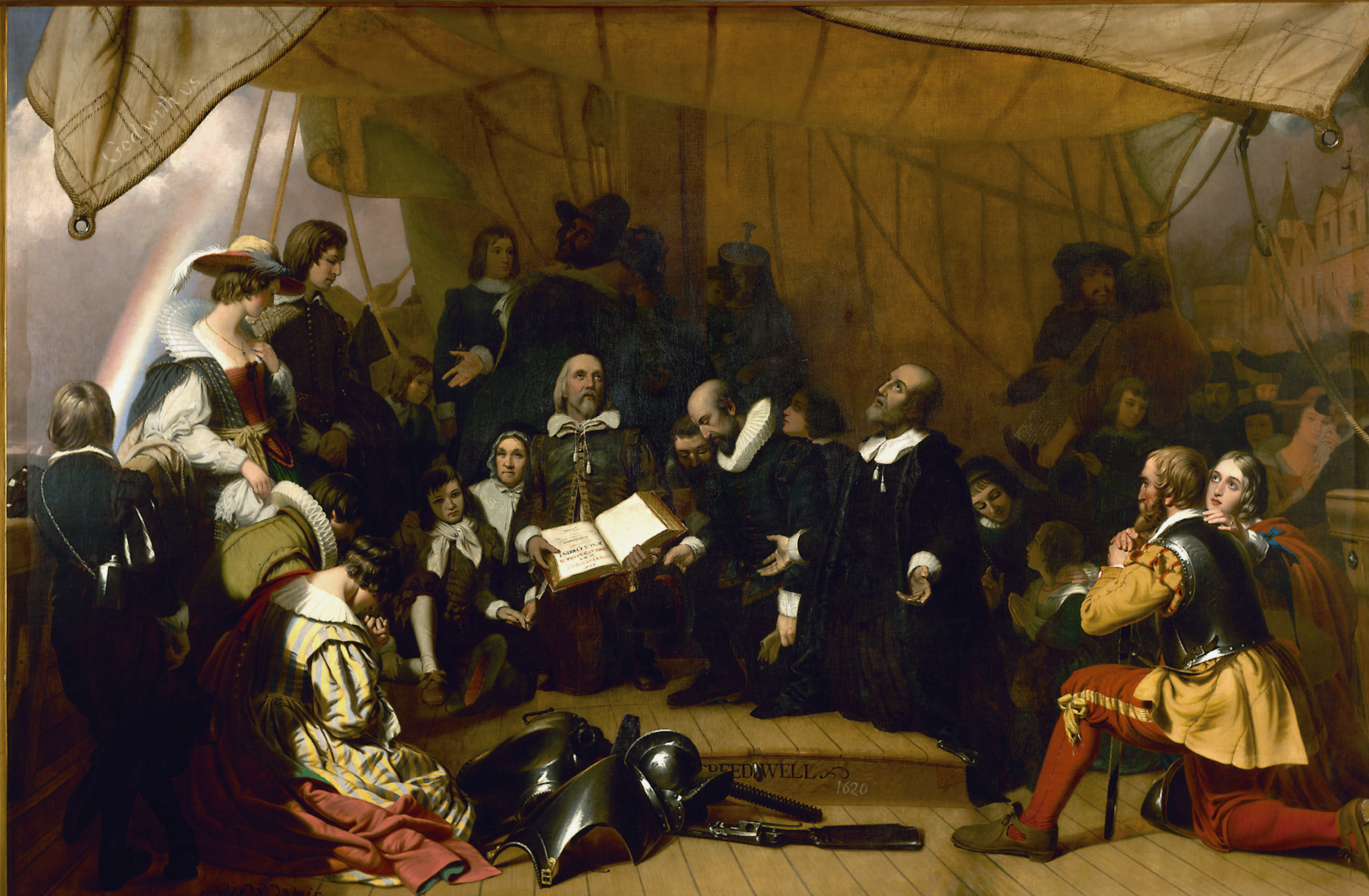
Embarkation of the Pilgrims by Robert W. Weir

Several contemporaneous accounts of life in Plymouth Colony have become both vital primary historical documents and literary classics. Of Plimoth Plantation (1630 and 1651) by William Bradford and Mourt's Relation (1622) by Bradford, Edward Winslow, and others are both accounts written by Mayflower passengers that provide much of the information which we have today regarding the trans-Atlantic voyage and early years of the settlement.

Benjamin Church wrote several accounts of King Philip's War, including Entertaining Passages Relating to Philip's War, which remained popular throughout the 18th century. An edition of the work was illustrated by Paul Revere in 1772. The Sovereignty and Goodness of God provides an account of King Philip's War from the perspective of Mary Rowlandson, an Englishwoman who was captured and held by Philip's tribe during the war. Later works have provided a romantic and partially fictionalized account of life in Plymouth Colony, such as The Courtship of Miles Standish by Henry Wadsworth Longfellow.

There are also numerous films about the Pilgrims, including several film adaptations of The Courtship of Miles Standish; the 1952 film Plymouth Adventure starring Spencer Tracy; and Desperate Crossings: The True Story of the Mayflower, a 2006 television documentary produced by the History Channel.

=== Thanksgiving ===
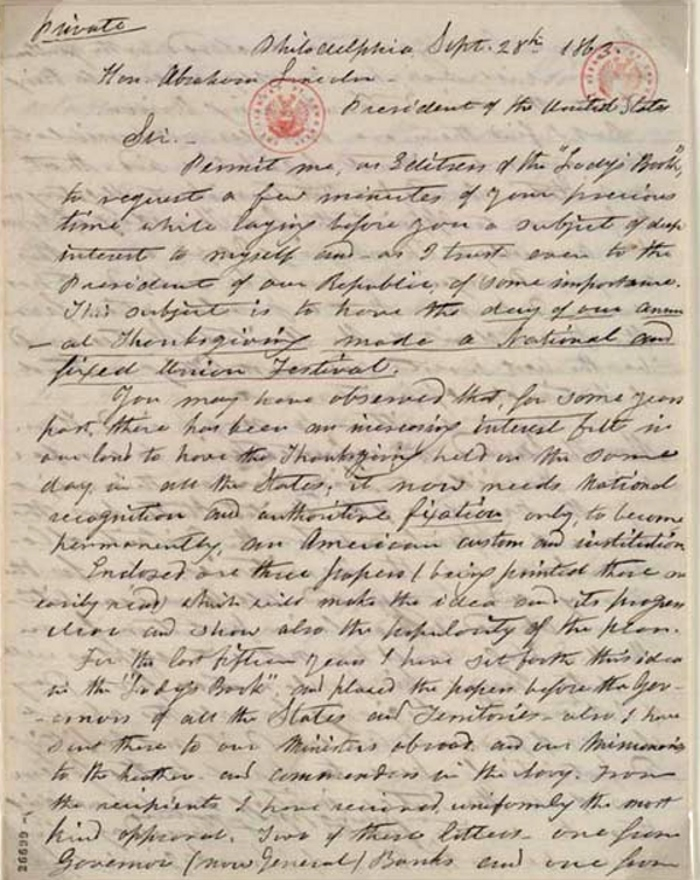
1863 letter from Sarah Josepha Hale to President Abraham Lincoln discussing the creation of a Thanksgiving holiday

Each year, the United States celebrates the holiday of Thanksgiving on the fourth Thursday of November. It is a federal holiday and frequently involves a family gathering with a large feast, traditionally featuring a turkey. Civic recognitions of the holiday typically include parades and football games. The holiday is meant to honor the First Thanksgiving, which was a feast of thanksgiving held in Plymouth in 1621, as first recorded in the book Of Plymouth Plantation by William Bradford, one of the Mayflower pilgrims and the colony's second governor.

The annual Thanksgiving holiday is a more recent creation. Throughout the early 19th century, the U.S. government had declared a particular day as a national day of Thanksgiving, but these were one-time declarations meant to celebrate a significant event, such as victory in a battle. The northeastern states began adopting an annual day of Thanksgiving in November shortly after the end of the War of 1812. Sarah Josepha Hale, editor of Boston's Ladies' Magazine, wrote editorials beginning in 1827 which called for the nationwide expansion of this annual day of thanksgiving to commemorate the Pilgrim's first feast. After nearly 40 years, Abraham Lincoln declared the first modern Thanksgiving to fall on the last Thursday in November in 1863. Franklin Delano Roosevelt and Congress ultimately moved it to the fourth Thursday in November. After some sparring as to the date, the holiday was recognized by Congress as an official federal holiday in 1941.

=== Plymouth Rock ===
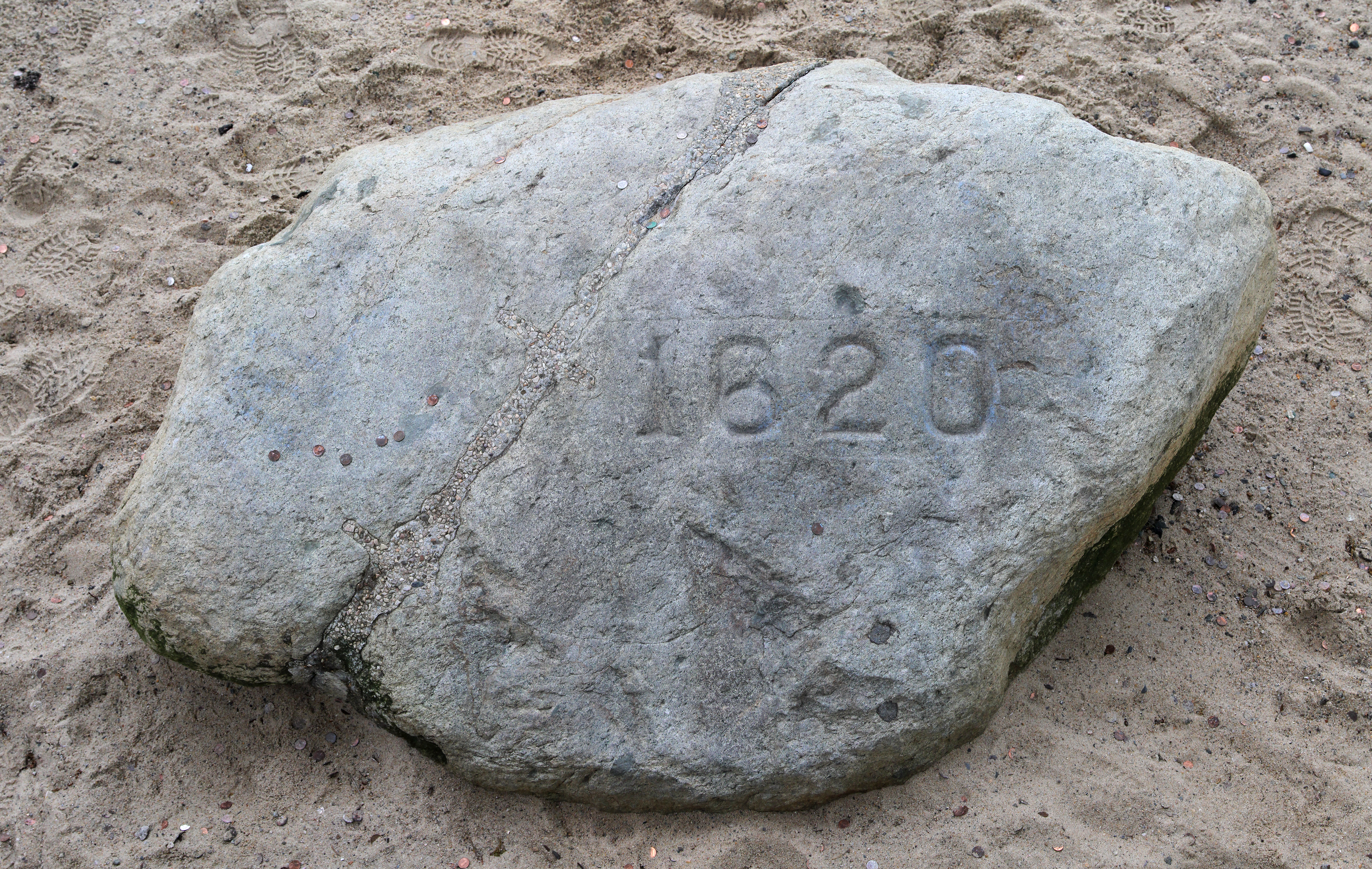
Plymouth Rock, inscribed with 1620, the year of the Pilgrims' landing in the Mayflower

One of the enduring symbols of the landing of the Pilgrims is Plymouth Rock, a large granodiorite boulder that was near their landing site at Plymouth. However, none of the contemporaneous accounts of the actual landing makes any mention that the Rock was the specific place of landing. The Pilgrims chose the site for their landing, not for the rock, but for a small brook nearby that was a source of fresh water and fish.

The first identification of Plymouth Rock as the actual landing site was in 1741 by 90-year-old Thomas Faunce, whose father had arrived in Plymouth in 1623, three years after the Mayflower arrived. The rock was later covered by a solid-fill pier. In 1774, an attempt was made to excavate it, but it broke in two. The severed piece was placed in the Town Square at the center of Plymouth. In 1880, the intact half of the rock was excavated from the pier, and the broken piece was reattached to it. Over the years, souvenir hunters have removed chunks from the rock, but the remains are now protected as part of the complex of living history museums. These include the Mayflower II, a recreation of the original ship; Plimoth Patuxet (formerly called Plimoth Plantation), a historical recreation of the original 1620 settlement; and the Wampanoag Homesite, which recreates a 17th-century Indian village.

=== Political legacy ===
The democratic setup of Plymouth Colony had a strong influence on shaping democracy in both England and America. William Bradford's Of Plimoth Plantation was widely read in England. It influenced the political thought of Puritan politician and poet John Milton, assistant to Oliver Cromwell, and philosopher John Locke. For example, Locke referred to the Mayflower Compact in his Letters Concerning Toleration. In America, Plymouth Colony initiated a democratic tradition that was followed by Massachusetts Bay Colony (1628), Connecticut Colony (1636), the Colony of Rhode Island and Providence Plantations (1636), the Province of New Jersey, and Pennsylvania (1681). Roger Williams established Providence Plantations specifically as a safe haven for those who experienced religious persecution, thereby adding freedom of conscience to Plymouth's democratic model.

=== The Mayflower Society ===
The General Society of Mayflower Descendants, or The Mayflower Society, is a genealogical organization of individuals who have documented their descent from one or more of the 102 passengers who arrived on the Mayflower in 1620. The Society was founded at Plymouth in 1897 and claims that tens of millions of Americans are descended from these passengers, and it offers research services for people seeking to document their descent.

== See also ==
- David Pulsifer — Editor of the Records of the Colony of New Plymouth in New England from 1633 to I679
- English colonial empire
- European colonization of the Americas
- British colonization of the Americas
- Colonial America
- Plantation (settlement or colony)
- List of colonial governors of Massachusetts (includes Plymouth)

=== Locations related to Plymouth Colony ===
- Alexander Standish House
- Burial Hill, site of the first fort at New Plymouth, originally known as Fort Hill
- Cole's Hill, contained the original cemetery at New Plymouth, later moved to Burial Hill
- First Parish Church in Plymouth, the modern descendant of the Scrooby congregation that founded Plymouth Colony
- First Parish Church (Duxbury, Massachusetts), another early congregation founded by the Pilgrims
- Harlow Old Fort House, a private house built in 1677 in Plymouth, partially out of timbers of the original fort built in 1621
- Jabez Howland House
- Jenney Grist Mill
- John and Priscilla Alden Family Sites
- Leyden Street, claimed to be the first street in Plymouth Colony
- Myles Standish Burial Ground contains remains of several important Pilgrims, including Myles Standish
- Plymouth Village Historic District
- Town Brook Historic and Archaeological District
- Wing Fort House, a historic house built in 1641. It was added to the National Register of Historic Places in 1976.

=== Monuments and other commemorations ===
- Myles Standish Monument State Reservation
- National Monument to the Forefathers
- Pilgrim Hall Museum
- Pilgrim Monument
- Plimoth Patuxet
- Plymouth Antiquarian Society
- Plymouth Rock

== Works cited ==
- Addison, Albert Christopher (1911). The Romantic Story of the Mayflower Pilgrims, and Its Place in the Life of To-day. Boston: L.C. Page & Company.
- Barth, Jonathan Edward (2014). "'A Peculiar Stampe of Our Owne': The Massachusetts Mint and the Battle over Sovereignty, 1652–1691". The New England Quarterly. 87 (3): 490–525. doi:10.1162/TNEQ_a_00396. hdl:2286/R.I.26592. JSTOR 43285101. S2CID 57571000.
- Deetz, James; Patricia Scott Deetz (2000). The Times of Their Lives: Life, Love, and Death in Plymouth Colony. New York: W. H. Freeman and Company. ISBN 0-7167-3830-9.
- Demos, John (1970). A Little Commonwealth: Family Life in Plymouth Colony. New York: Oxford University Press.
- Demos, John (1965). "Notes on Life in Plymouth Colony" (PDF). The William and Mary Quarterly. 3. 22 (2) (published April 1965): 264–286. doi:10.2307/1920699. JSTOR 1920699. Archived (PDF) from the original on December 22, 2015.
- Johnson, Paul (1997). A History of the American People. New York: HarperCollins. ISBN 0-06-016836-6.
- Philbrick, Nathaniel (2006). Mayflower: A Story of Courage, Community, and War. New York: Penguin Group. ISBN 0-670-03760-5.
- Weinstein, Allen; David Rubel (2002). The Story of America: Freedom and Crisis from Settlement to Superpower. New York: DK Publishing. ISBN 0-7894-8903-1.
