= Town Brook =

Town Brook may refer to:

- Town Brook (Massachusetts)
  - Town Brook Historic and Archeological District
- Town Brook, New Jersey
- Town Brook (West Branch Delaware River)
