= Little Pond (Massachusetts) =

Pond in Massachusetts, United States

- Location within Massachusetts Location within the United States
- Location: Plymouth, Massachusetts
- Coordinates: 41°56′31″N 70°41′10″W
- Basin countries: United States
- Surface area: 43 acres (17 ha)
- Average depth: 19 ft (5.8 m)
- Max. depth: 51 ft (16 m)

Little Pond is a 43-acre (170,000 m^{2}) cold-water pond in Plymouth, Massachusetts. The pond is located in Morton Park, adjacent to Billington Sea. The average depth is 19 feet (5.8 m) and the maximum depth is 51 feet (16 m). There are 1.2 miles (1.9 km) of shoreline. Little Pond is a popular summer swimming spot; a public beach runs along the northern shore of the pond. The pond is stocked with rainbow and brown trout.
