= Town Brook Historic and Archeological District =

Historic district in Massachusetts, United States

- U.S. National Register of Historic Places
- U.S. Historic district
- Town Brook flows from Billington Sea

- Location within Massachusetts Location within the United States
- Location: Plymouth, Massachusetts
- Coordinates: 41°57′1″N 70°40′8″W
- Built: 1633
- Architect: Kitson, Henry H.
- Architectural style: Mid 19th Century Revival, Georgian, Colonial
- NRHP reference No.: 95001176
- Added to NRHP: October 12, 1995

The Town Brook Historic and Archeological District is a historic district encompassing much of the length of Town Brook and its surrounding landscape in Plymouth, Massachusetts. This area has an industrial history that extends to 1620, when the Pilgrims arrived on the Mayflower and established Plymouth Colony. It extends roughly from the crossing of Billington Street (near where it crosses Massachusetts Route 3), to the mouth of the brook in Plymouth Harbor. The district was listed on the National Register of Historic Places in 1995.

The district includes historical and archaeological resources that span more than three centuries. Included in these resources are four mill ponds, dams, herring runs, mill privileges (sites where mill operators were authorized to divert water, where industrial archaeological remains may be found), and a variety of housing from nearly every significant period in that time. The oldest house in the district is the Richard Sparrow House built in 1640; it is also the oldest building standing in Plymouth.

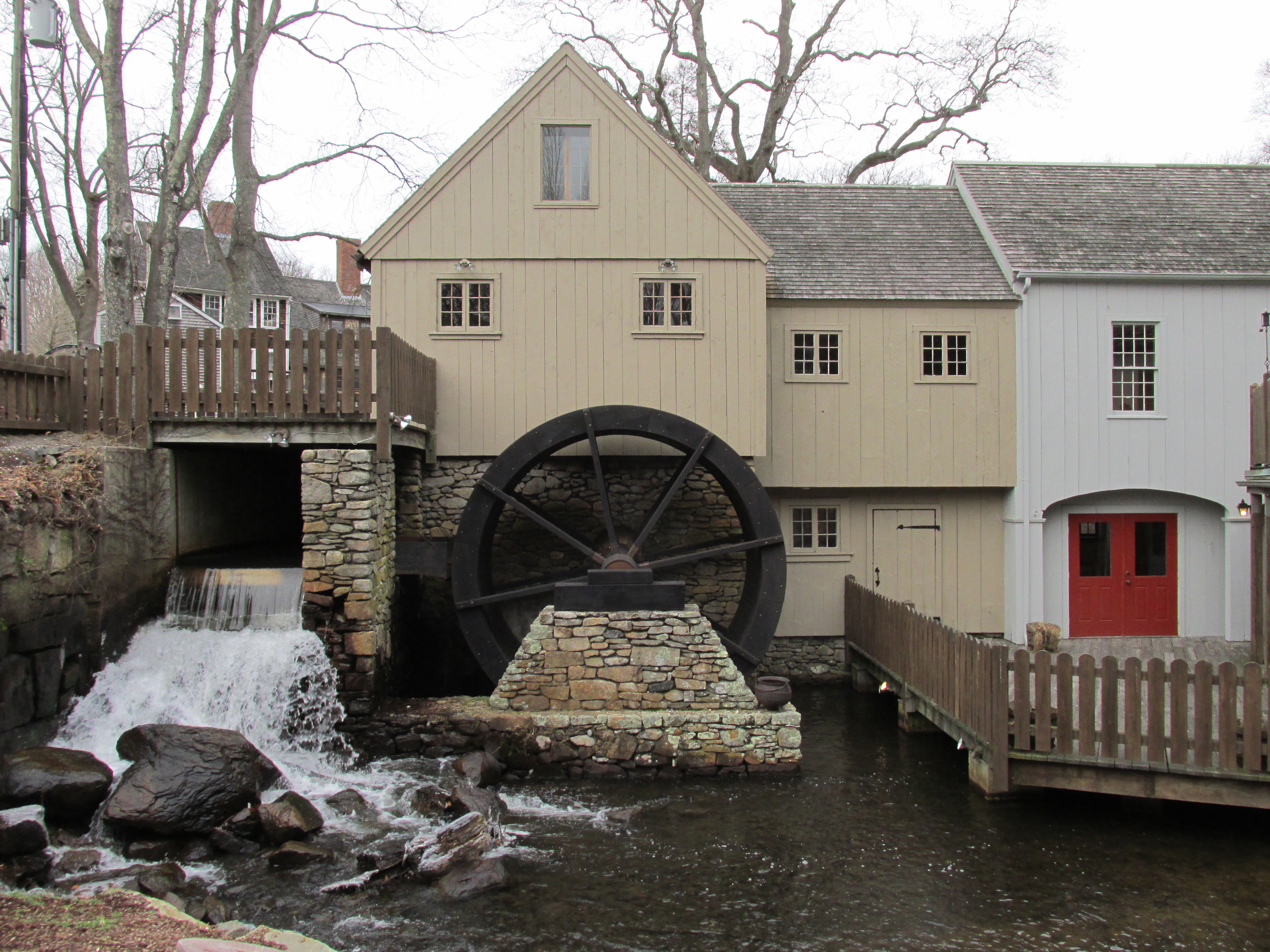
The reconstructed Jenney Grist Mill

The mills erected by the early settlers were used to saw wood and grind grain. As Plymouth prospered and grew, smaller industrial operations harnessed the brook's water power to perform other functions. During the 19th century, the nation's industrialization reached Town Brook, and mill complexes of larger size were also built. Around the turn of the 20th century, mills were established for processing iron in a variety of ways, some of whose buildings still survive today. A significant number of industrial properties from the 19th century were lost in the 20th century, often to fire. Interest in the area's rich history led to the establishment in the 1920s of Brewster Gardens, a public park near the mouth of the brook. Near the park is the Jenney Grist Mill, a 1970 reconstruction of an early grist mill which burned in 1837.

== See also ==
- National Register of Historic Places listings in Plymouth County, Massachusetts
