= Morton Park (Massachusetts) =

Park in Massachusetts, United States

Coordinates: 41°56′27″N 70°41′12″W

Morton Park is a park in Plymouth, Massachusetts, located west of Route 3 and northwest of Lout Pond with its main entrance off Summer Street and its rear entrance off Billington Street. It is Plymouth's largest park area consisting of 200 acres (0.8 km^{2}) of forest, the shoreline of Little Pond, the northern shoreline of Billington Sea, the headwaters to Town Brook, and over two miles (3 km) of footpaths.

Morton Park was established in 1889, with funding from citizens of Plymouth as well as several landowners, including Dr. LeBaron Russell. The effort was led by Nathaniel Morton, for whom the park is named.
