= Southeastern Massachusetts Agricultural Partnership =

The Southeastern Massachusetts Agricultural Partnership (SEMAP) is an organization based in Massachusetts that comprises farmers, farm technical assistance providers, landscape designers, policy makers, bakers, brewers, and other food systems experts all working in conjunction to further the region's understanding of, access to, and support for more local and sustainable farming. SEMAP is partially funded by the Massachusetts Department of Agricultural Resources, which oversees efforts by both the state as well as groups and organizations to keep the state's agriculture both economically and environmentally sound. Additionally, SEMAP promotes local farmers' markets and participates in the "Buy Local Buy Fresh" movement in the United States by handing out regional bumper stickers. On March 11, 2017, SEMAP held "the first state-wide grain gathering in the 21st century" at the Plimoth Grist Mill in Plymouth, Massachusetts. In February 2019, SEMAP held its 12th Annual Agriculture & Food Conference at Bristol County Agricultural High School in Dighton, Massachusetts. The conference covered a variety of agricultural topics including climate change impacts on local agriculture, and a roundtable discussion for members of local agricultural commissions in the region.

== See also ==
- Agricultural cooperative
- Local purchasing
- Local food
- Community-supported agriculture
- Farm-to-table
