= Patuxet =

Patuxet Village
- Village
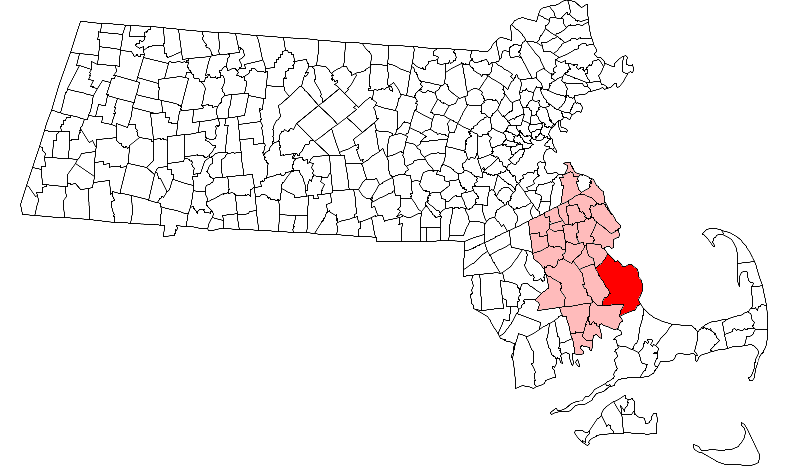
- Historic area of the Patuxet tribe
- Coordinates: 41°57′30″N 70°40′04″W
- Country: United States
- State: Massachusetts
- County: Plymouth
- Settled: late 15th or 16th century
- Defunct: ~1617
- Elevation: 187 ft (57 m)

Population
  - Total: 0

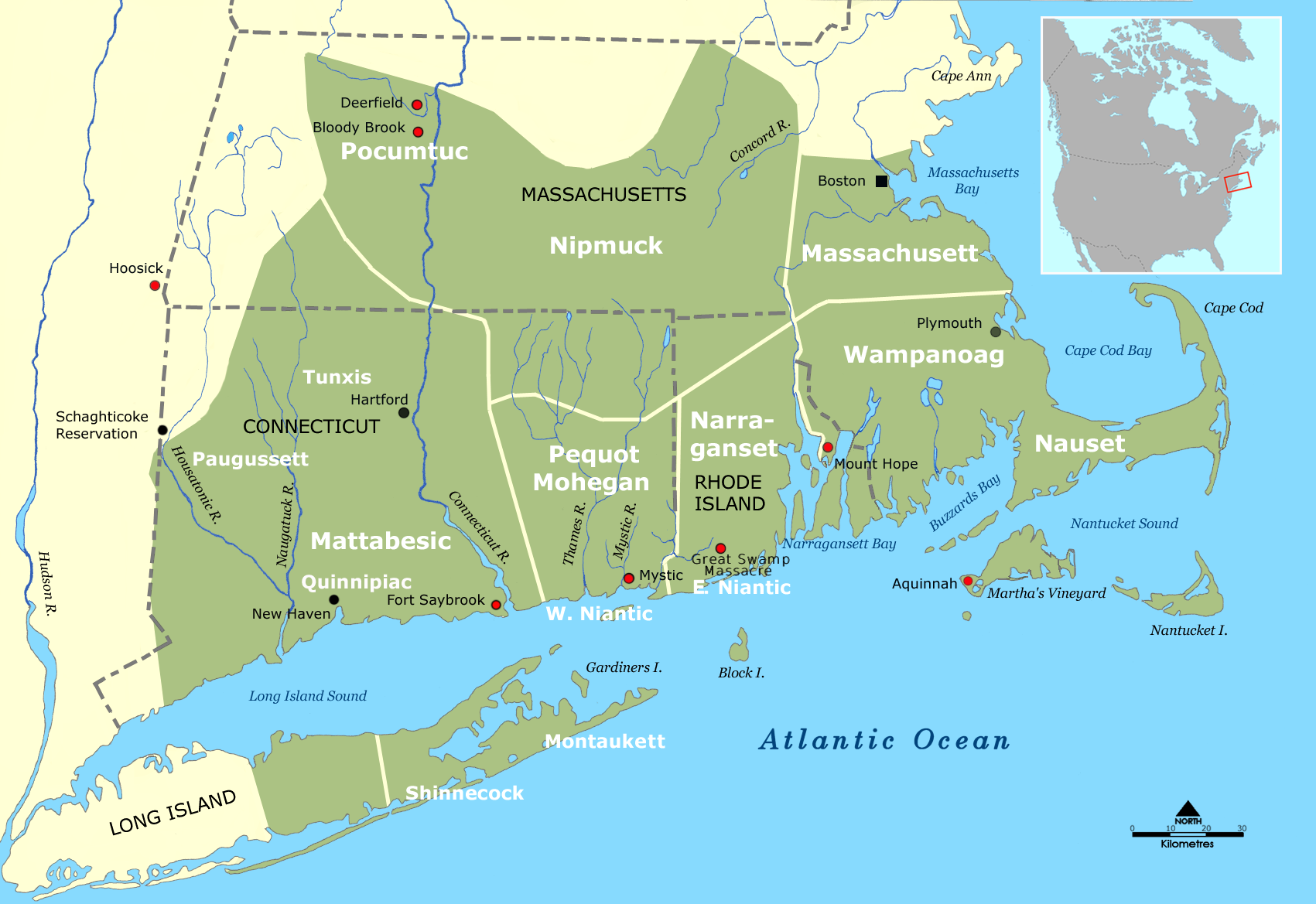
Historical Native American Tribal Territories of Southern New England

The Patuxet were a Native American band of the Wampanoag confederation. They lived primarily in and around modern-day Plymouth, Massachusetts, and were among the first Native Americans encountered by European settlers in the region in the early 17th century. Most of the population subsequently died of epidemic infectious diseases. The last of the Patuxet – an individual named Tisquantum (a.k.a. "Squanto"), played an important role in the survival of the Pilgrim colony at Plymouth – died in 1622.

== Devastation ==
The Patuxet were wiped out by a series of plagues that decimated the indigenous peoples of southeastern New England in the second decade of the 17th century. The epidemics which swept across New England and the Canadian Maritimes between 1614 and 1620 were especially devastating to the Wampanoag and neighboring Massachusett, with mortality reaching 100% in many mainland villages. When the Pilgrims landed in 1620, all the Patuxet except Tisquantum had died. The plagues have been attributed variously to smallpox, leptospirosis, and other diseases.

== The last Patuxet ==
Some European expedition captains were known to increase profits by capturing natives to sell as slaves. Such was the case when Thomas Hunt kidnapped several Wampanoag in 1614 in order to sell them later in Spain. One of Hunt's captives was a Patuxet named Tisquantum, who eventually came to be known as Squanto (a nickname given to him by his friend William Bradford). After Tisquantum regained his freedom, he was able to work his way to England where he lived for several years, working with a shipbuilder.

He signed on as an interpreter for a British expedition to Newfoundland. From there Tisquantum went back to his home, only to discover that, in his absence, epidemics had killed everyone in his village.

Tisquantum succumbed to a fever in November 1622.

== The Pilgrims ==
The first settlers of Plymouth Colony (modern Plymouth, Massachusetts), sited their colony at the location of a former Patuxet village, named "Port St. Louis" (Samuel de Champlain, 1605) or "Accomack" (John Smith, 1614). By 1616, the site had been renamed "New Plimoth" in Smith's A Description of New England after a suggestion by Prince Charles of England. When the Pilgrim Settlers decided to make their settlement, the land that had been cleared and cultivated by the prior inhabitants (since dead through disease) was a primary reason for the location.

Squanto was instrumental in the survival of the colony of English settlers at Plymouth. Samoset, a Pemaquid (Abenaki) sachem from Maine, introduced himself to the Pilgrims upon their arrival in 1620. Shortly thereafter, he introduced Squanto (who presumably spoke better English) to the Pilgrims, who had settled at the site of Squanto's former village. From that point onward, Squanto devoted himself to helping the Pilgrims. Whatever his motivations, with great kindness and patience, he taught the English the skills they needed to survive, including how best to cultivate varieties of the Three Sisters: beans, maize and squash.

Although Samoset appears to have been important in establishing initial relations with the Pilgrims, Squanto was undoubtedly the main factor in the Pilgrims' survival. In addition, he also served as an intermediary between the Pilgrims and Massasoit, the Grand Sachem of the Wampanoag (original name Ousamequin or "Yellow Feather"). As such, he was instrumental in the friendship treaty that the two signed, allowing the settlers to occupy the area around the former Patuxet village. Massasoit honored this treaty until his death in 1661.

== Thanksgiving ==
In the fall of 1621, the Plymouth colonists and Wampanoag shared an autumn harvest feast. This three-day celebration involving the entire village and about 90 Wampanoag has been celebrated as a symbol of cooperation and interaction between English colonists and Native Americans. The event later inspired 19th-century Americans to establish Thanksgiving as a national holiday in the United States. The harvest celebration took place at the historic site of the Patuxet villages. Squanto's involvement as an intermediary in negotiating the friendship treaty with Massasoit led to the joint feast between the Pilgrims and Wampanoag. This feast was a celebration of the first successful harvest season of the colonists.

== See also ==
- List of federally recognized tribes in the United States
- Native American tribes in Massachusetts
