= Cooks Pond (Plymouth, Massachusetts) =

Reservoir in Plymouth, Massachusetts, US

- Location within Massachusetts Location within the United States
- Location: Plymouth, Massachusetts
- Coordinates: 41°55′20″N 70°40′00″W
- Basin countries: United States
- Surface area: 23 acres (9.3 ha)

Cooks Pond is a 23-acre (93,000 m^{2}) reservoir in Plymouth, Massachusetts. The pond is within the Eel River watershed, located north of South Pond village, near The Shops at 5 and the main Post Office, and southeast of Lout Pond. The pond suffers from trash along the northern shore as well as erosion at the access point on the north side of the pond, each of which was noted in a 2002 field inspection.

The pond was named after Jacob Cook, the original owner of the site.
