= Lout Pond =

Pond in Massachusetts, United States

- Location within Massachusetts
- Location: Plymouth, Massachusetts
- Coordinates: 41°56′07″N 70°40′15″W
- Type: kettlehole
- Basin countries: United States
- Surface area: 18 acres (7.3 ha)
- Average depth: 19 ft (5.8 m)
- Max. depth: 36 ft (11 m)

Lout Pond is an 18-acre (73,000 m^{2}) kettlehole pond in Plymouth, Massachusetts, east of Billington Sea, southeast of Morton Park, and northwest of Cooks Pond. The pond has an average depth of 19 feet (5.8 m) and a maximum depth of 36 feet (11 m). The northern and southern shores have been developed extensively. Cranberry bogs are along the western shore, and Billington Street runs along the eastern shore. Parking is available along the side of the road; however, due to the steep bank only canoes and car top boats can be launched, electric motors only.

"Lout" is a name derived from the Latin lout, meaning "clay" or "mud".
