= Brewster Gardens =

Park located in the center of Plymouth, Massachusetts

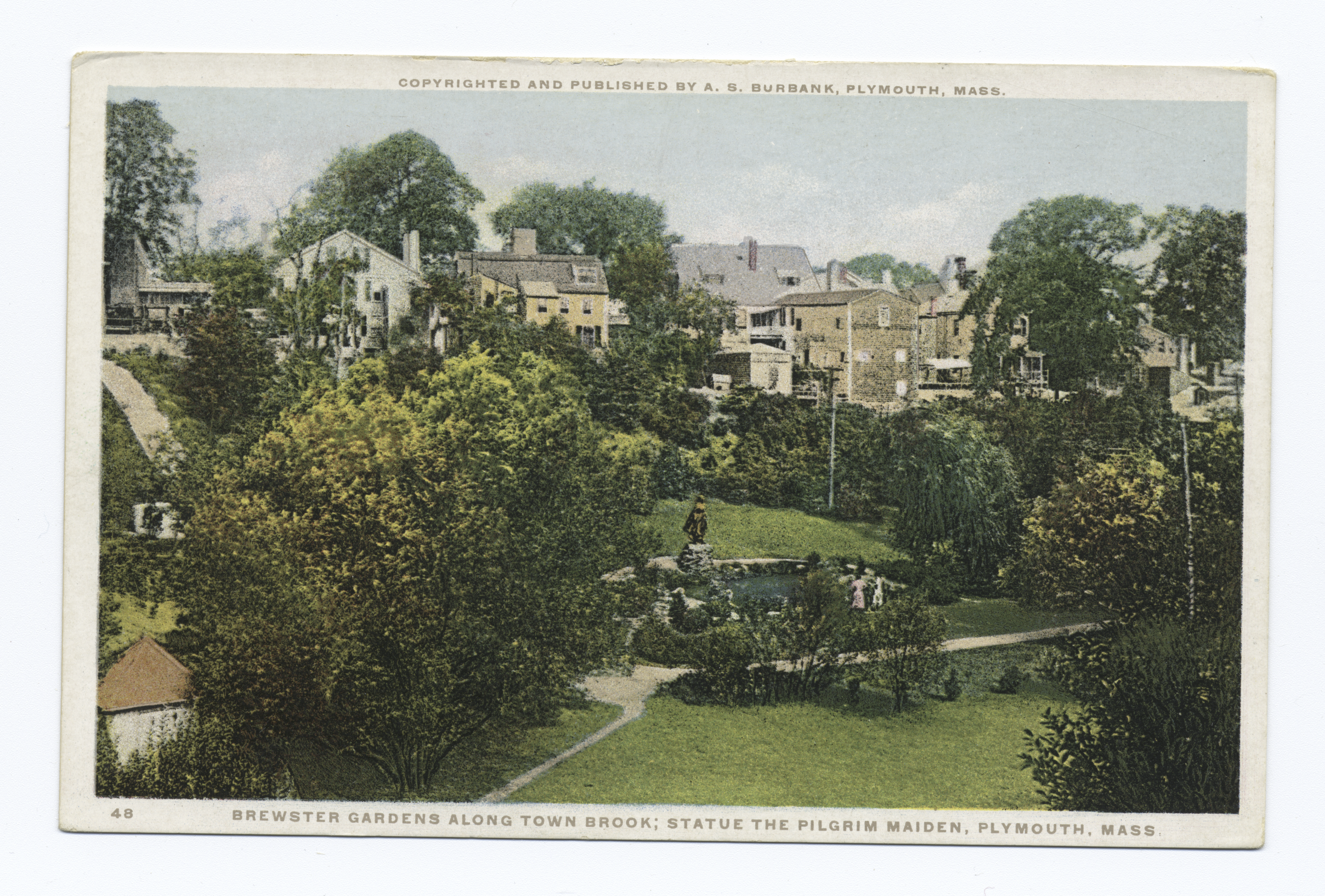
- Brewster Gardens Along Town Brook

- Location within Massachusetts
- Interactive map of Brewster Gardens
- Type: Public City Park
- Location: 30 Water Street; Plymouth, Massachusetts
- Coordinates: 41°57′11.39″N 70°39′26.99″W
- Area: 2.9 acres (0.012 km^{2})
- Created: 1920s
- Operator: City of Plymouth
- Website: Brewster Gardens

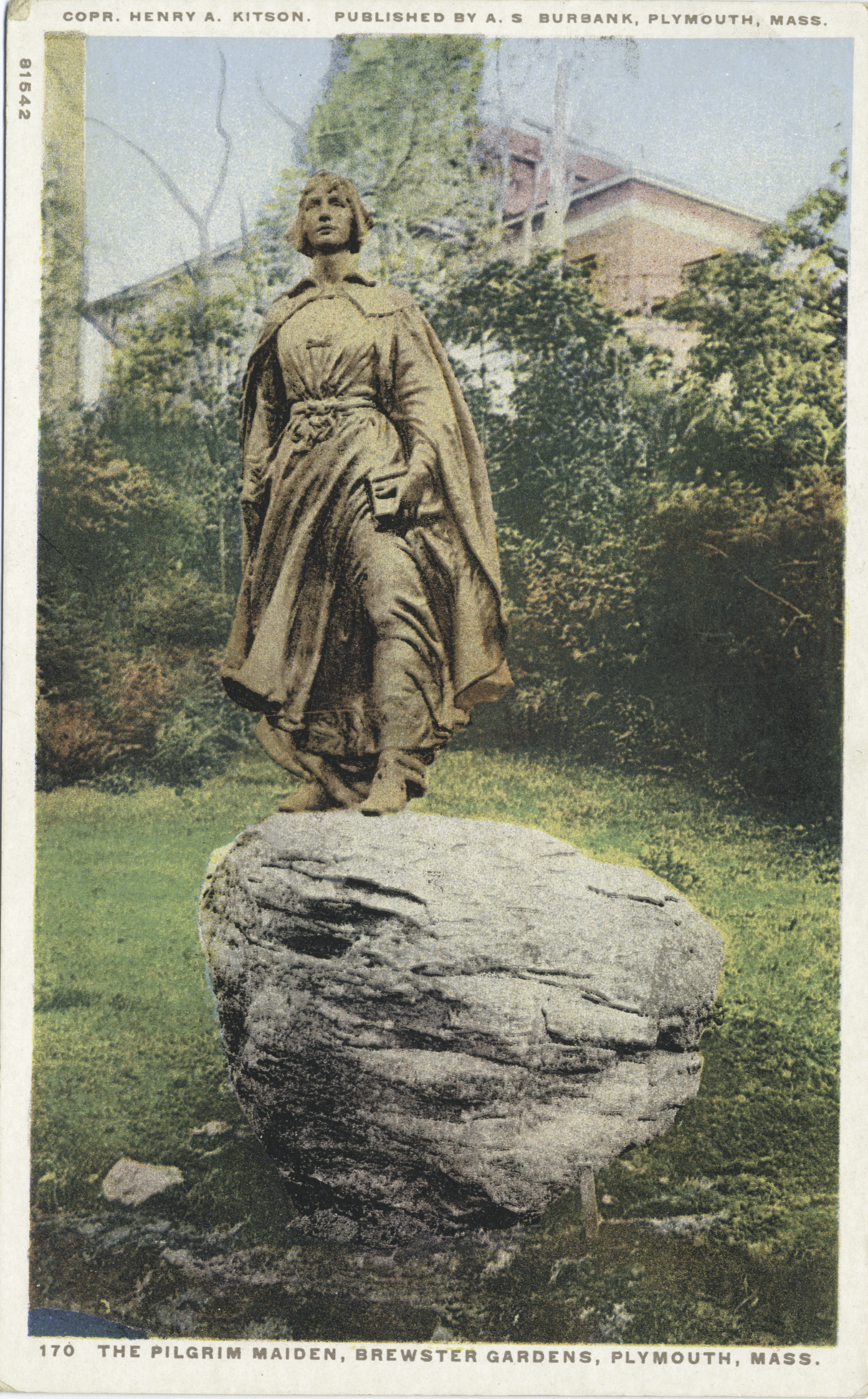
The Pilgrim Maiden, Brewster Gardens, Plymouth, Massachusetts. This statue is not of a particular Pilgrim, but it most closely fits Elizabeth Tilley and Mary Chilton in age.

Brewster Gardens is a small 2.9 acres (0.012 km^{2}) park located in the center of Plymouth, Massachusetts. The park name honors Mayflower settler Elder William Brewster.

The park runs along both sides of Town Brook from the nature trail at the headwaters of the brook, past Jenney Grist Mill, underneath the Market Street and Main Street Extension (Route 3A) bridges to Water Street, across the street from the mouth of the brook, south of Plymouth Rock.

Created in the early 1920s, the park covers the original garden plot that was granted to Elder William Brewster in 1620. Located in the park are a bronze statue, The Pilgrim Maiden by Henry Hudson Kitson (1922) and a stainless steel sculpture honoring Plymouth's immigrant settlers from 1700 to 2000.

The stairway leading from the garden to the main street is currently undergoing improvement.
