= Billington Sea =

Pond in Massachusetts, United States

- Location within Massachusetts
- Location: Plymouth, Massachusetts
- Coordinates: 41°56′30″N 70°40′36″W
- Primary outflows: Town Brook
- Basin countries: United States
- Surface area: 269 acres (1.09 km^{2})
- Average depth: 7 ft (2.1 m)
- Max. depth: 11 ft (3.4 m)
- Islands: Seymour Island
- Settlements: Billington Sea village

Billington Sea (also Billington's Sea) is a 269-acre (1.09 km^{2}) warm water pond located in Plymouth, Massachusetts. Morton Park lies on the pond's northern shore. The pond is fed by groundwater and cranberry bog outlets. The average depth is seven feet and the maximum depth is 11 feet (3.4 m). The pond provides the headwaters to Town Brook. Seymour Island is located in the center of the pond. Billington Sea was named after Francis Billington, one of the passengers on the Mayflower.

== Description ==
Billington Sea is located southwest of the center of Plymouth, Massachusetts, west of Massachusetts Route 3 and south of U.S. Route 44. It is 269 acres in surface area with depth averaging 7 feet, with an 11-foot maximum depth. It is a warmwater eutrophic pond with extensive aquatic vegetation and a mostly mud bottom, though with sandy shorelines. Apart from a town park on the northern shore, most of the shoreline is occupied by private residential property.

== History ==
Billington's Sea was spotted in January 1621 by fourteen-year-old Mayflower passenger Francis Billington, son of John Billington. According to tradition, Francis Billington climbed up a tree and spotted what he called a "great sea," believing it to be the Pacific Ocean. He and one of the Mayflower's crew members went to explore the sea, but became alarmed when they saw some abandoned Native American houses. They were alone with only a single gun. In memory of Billington's error, the pond has been called "Billington's Sea" since.

== Recreational uses ==
A single public boat launch site is located at Morton Town Park on the north shore. The ramp is sandy and suitable only for small craft that can be launched by hand like canoes and kayaks. Recreational fishing is allowed in the pond, with largemouth bass being the primary target species.

== Fish populations ==
In addition to largemouth bass, the pond also contains pickerel, smallmouth bass, brook trout, black crappie, yellow perch, sunfishes such as pumpkinseed and bluegill, golden shiner, banded killifish, white perch, white sucker, and brown bullhead. A seasonal alewife run enters the pond from Plymouth Bay through Town Brook.

== Surrounding area ==
Billington Sea is also the name of a small village on the southern shore of the pond along Black Cat Road, northeast of Micajah Heights and northwest of Lout Pond. Briggs Reservoir is located within the village south of Black Cat Road.

== See also ==
- Town Brook Historic and Archeological District
- Neighborhoods in Plymouth, Massachusetts
- Plymouth, Massachusetts
