= A Description of New England =

1616 book by John Smith

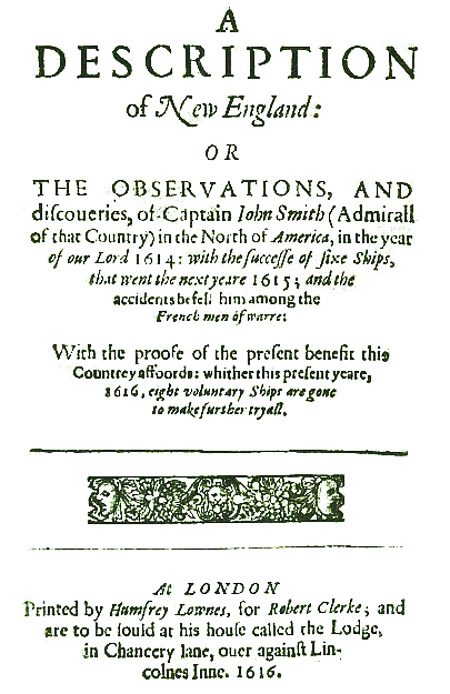
Title page of A Description of New England, published in 1616

A Description of New England (in full: A description of New England, or, Observations and discoveries in the north of America in the year of Our Lord 1614, with the success of six ships that went the next year, 1615) is a work written by John Smith. Published in 1616, it portrayed a fertile land of abundant resources and general plenitude to be found in the New World based on Smith's experiences in the Colony of Virginia.

Unlike the reasons that the Pilgrims and the Puritans had for migrating to the New World, The Virginia Company, and other sponsored companies that traveled over, mainly came to the New World in order to make a life for themselves and start over in an economically fresh region. Smith's work described the situations and circumstances that were to be found in the New World, but it mainly promoted Smith in his abilities of being a travel guide and helpful resource in navigating the New World if the English wanted to migrate there. In the work, he printed many maps of the surrounding areas, and because he did so, the immigrants used those maps and found no need for Smith's help; Smith did not receive as much money from being a travel guide as he had originally planned on and hoped for. His work, however, did enable the new settlers to come over with some background knowledge about the general area and people inhabiting it.

The work goes into great detail about the wildlife, plants, "majestic land forms like the mountains", and other natural features, such as streams and the sea, both of which offered a seemingly endless amount of food. Smith appealed to the idea of the wilderness as a refuge, even if the riches were hard-earned, which was something that the religious refugees needed to hear at the time of their leaving their native countries.

The New World was a dangerous place when the settlers first arrived, with harsh weather, many Indian tribes, and wild animals; Smith resorts to reckless exaggeration to sell potential settlers on the region. Smith describes the purest waters, "proceeding from the entrails of rocky mountains" and claims that "in the harbors we frequented, a little boy might take of....such delicate fish, at the ship's stern, more than six or ten can eat in a day; but with a casting net [we took] thousands when we pleased..."

It was a place where the settlers believed they were free to start their lives over and turn their lives completely over to God and his will for them. Even if Smith didn't believe in God necessarily, he was careful to include the ideas of God and religion in the work, as it was something that the majority of the population valued in their lives. Smith further encouraged the settlers by telling them that there can be no better reward than "planting and building a foundation for his posterity, got from the rude earth by God's blessing in his own industry, without prejudice to any?" This is similar to the idea of Manifest Destiny that prompted the migration west in the 19th century.

Smith successfully goaded many English by saying that "it (living in Virginia) is not a work for everyone...it requires all the best parts of art, judgement, courage, honesty, constancy, diligence, and industry to do but near well."
