= Town Brook (Massachusetts) =

Coordinates: 41°57′24″N 70°39′44″W

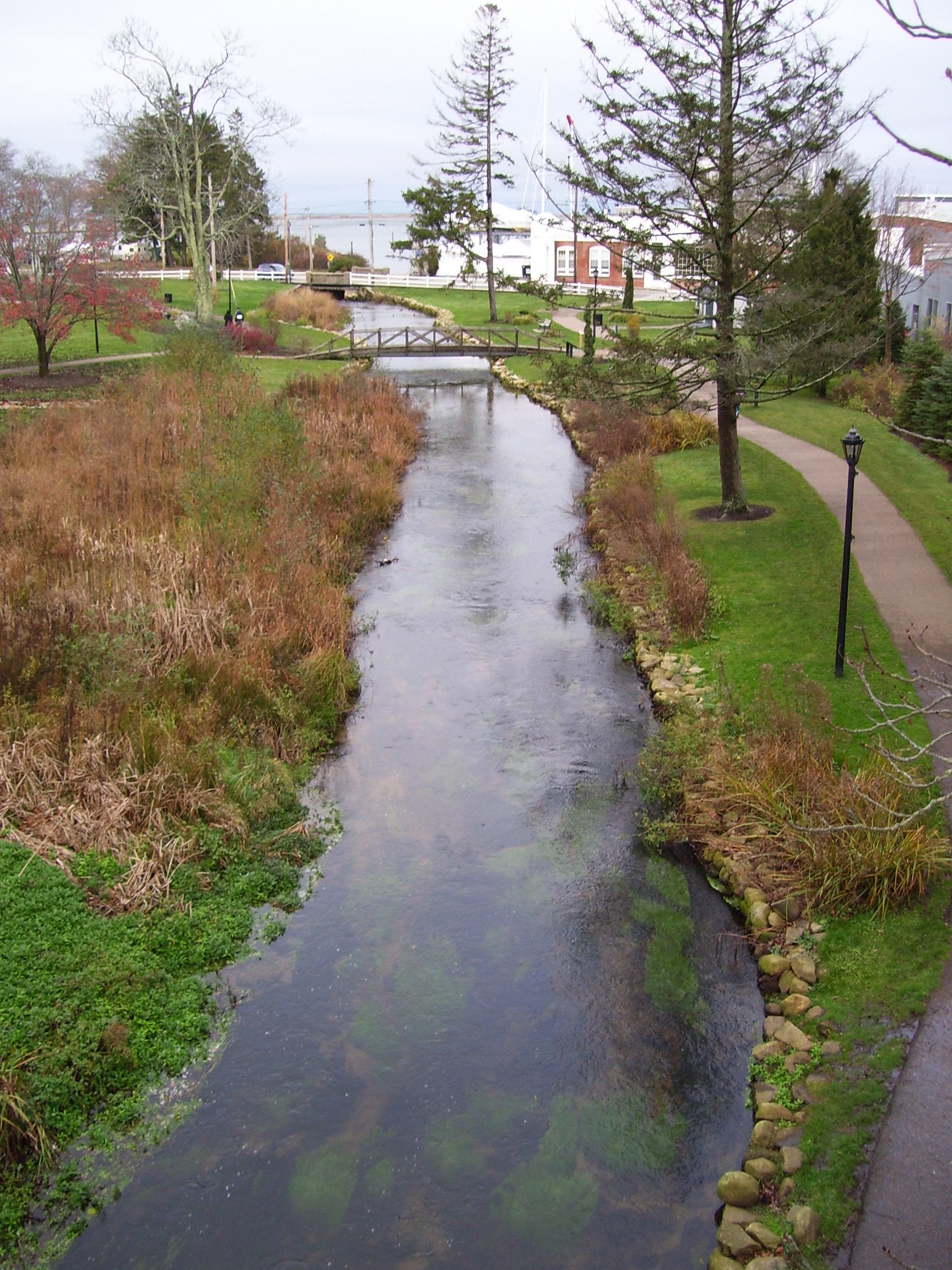
- Town Brook, near Plymouth Harbor

Location
- Country: United States
- State: Massachusetts
- Region: Plymouth

Physical characteristics
- Source
  - location: Billington Sea
- Mouth
  - location: Plymouth Harbor
- Length: 1.5 mi (2.4 km)

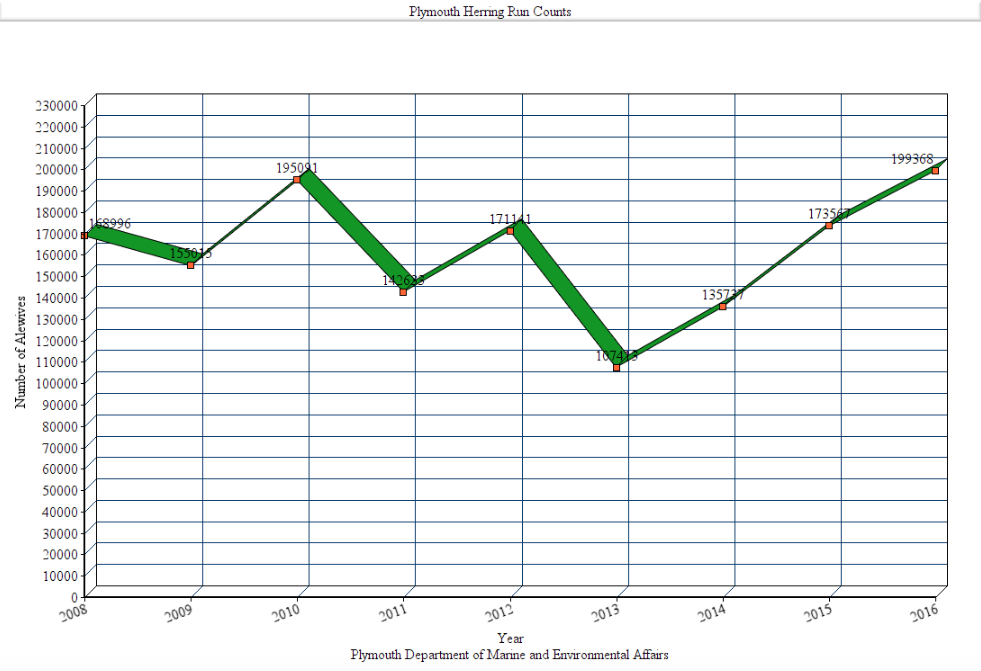
Town Brook Herring Run counts (2008-2016)

Town Brook is a 1.5-mile (2.4 km) stream in Patuxet, now also Plymouth, Massachusetts, that provided drinking water to the Wampanoag for centuries and millennia, and then the Pilgrims who made their homes adjacent to the brook on Leyden Street in Plymouth. Town Brook's headwaters are the Billington Sea, a 269-acre (109 ha) freshwater pond. The brook passes through numerous small ponds, including Deep Water Pond and Jenny Pond. It also passes by the Plimoth Grist Mill and the Brewster Gardens before emptying into Plymouth Harbor. A nature trail runs along the entire length of the brook.

== History ==
The Wampanoag inhabited Patuxet and the region around this village for millennia.

Later, the Pilgrims first made landfall at the tip of Cape Cod, but were reluctant to settle there due to the lack of fresh water. They sailed across to the mainland, and observed what one person described as “a very sweet brook,” fed by cool springs of “as good water as can be drunk.” At the brook's mouth was a salt marsh, where the colonists could anchor their boats. The Pilgrims built their houses near the fresh water supply.

The brook led to upstream spawning grounds for river herring. It also attracted eels and fresh water fowl. Squanto, an Indian interpreter, taught the colonists to use the fish to fertilize their corn crop. The first corn mill was built along the brook.

John Jenney arrived in the Plymouth Colony from Leyden in 1623, and built a grist mill on Town Brook in 1636. The original mill burned down in 1847. The banks of the brook were used for industrial purposes (at times powered by the brook's waters) well into the 20th century.

== Herring Run ==
Each Spring, the brook sees thousands of alewives, an anadromous type of herring, swimming up its path to eventually spawn in the Billington Sea. Historically, the number of alewives spotted were reportedly enough so that one could "walk across their backs" to the other side of the water. In the time since the Pilgrims' arrival, the number of alewives have dwindled drastically due to the increasing human population and industrialization of the area (including numerous dams). The first regulation, enacted October 28, 1623, observed the environmental impact, and regulated the taking of the fish therein. In recent times, significant efforts have been pursued in the hopes of increasing those numbers for ecological improvement of the brook. Although an estimate of 7,000 herring were counted in 2003, counts before and after that time until 2008 remain relatively sketchy at best. Starting in 2008, counts began receiving considerable recognition and recording by Plymouth's Department of Marine and Environmental Affairs and the National Oceanic and Atmospheric Administration. In 2016, the count was 199,368 alewives. Additionally, projects around the region to remove old dams have helped the alewife numbers increase, and have received support from the Environmental Protection Agency, the U.S. Fish and Wildlife Service, the U.S. Army Corps of Engineers, the U.S. Army Reserves, and more.

Significant restoration has been conducted on Town Brook in the last 20 years for fisheries/alewife restoration. Billington Street Dam was removed in 2002, Off-Billington Street Dam removed in 2013, Plymco Dam removed in 2014–15, and finally the Holmes Dam was removed in 2018–19.

== Crossings ==
Eleven roads pass over Town Brook, including two major highways.

- Little Pond Road
- Route 3 (Pilgrims Highway)
- Billington Street
- Driveway to 96R Billington Street
- Off Billington Street
- Newfield Street
- Willard Place
- Spring Court
- Pleasant Street
- Route 3A (Main Street Extension)
- Water Street

== Tributaries ==
Two small streams flow into Town Brook in downtown Plymouth, but they are not named.

== Nearby attractions ==
Many attractions are near Town Brook, especially since Plymouth is of such historical importance. This is a list of the attractions within one quarter of a mile from Town Brook.

- Morton Park
- Jenney Grist Mill
- Brewster Gardens
- Plymouth Rock
- Massasoit Statue
- State Pier (Mayflower II)
- Plymouth Yacht Club
- Burton Park
