= Plimoth Grist Mill =

Working grist mill in Plymouth, Massachusetts

Coordinates: 41°57′13.84″N 70°39′56.01″W

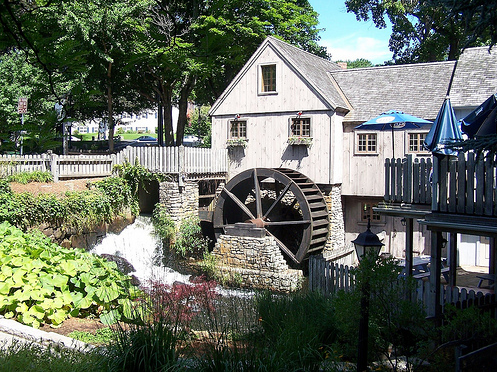
Plimoth Grist Mill

The Plimoth Grist Mill (formerly the Jenney Grist Mill) is a working grist mill located in Plymouth, Massachusetts. It is a reconstruction of the original Jenney Grist Mill, and it stands on the site of the original mill.

== History ==
John Jenney, a Pilgrim who arrived in Plymouth in 1623 on the ship Little James, erected the original grist mill in Plymouth in 1636. Jenney died in 1644, leaving the mill to his wife, Sarah. Sarah operated the mill until her own death. One of their sons, Samuel, eventually sold it in 1683 to Charles Stockbridge, the owner of another mill in the nearby town of Scituate. Stockbridge died shortly after purchasing the Jenney's old mill, leading his widow to sell the mill again, this time to Nathanial Church, brother of Benjamin Church. The Church family operated the mill until ownership was split up amongst numerous people beginning in the 1720s. In the mid-1840s, a fire engulfed the entire building.

Afterwards, the property saw the construction of other mills mostly dedicated to manufacturing rather than food production. During the middle of the 20th century, Plymouth underwent a number of urban re-development projects in the area, culminating in the re-constructed Jenney Grist Mill upon the same location as the original in 1969, with some parts, including the millstones, having been salvaged from a 19th century mill in Pennsylvania.

== Present ==
In 1999, photographer Leo Martin located the site to turn into a studio. He instead decided to rent the site and lead tours of it to preserve its history as a nonprofit organization. He also ran the Millstone Creamery downstairs and sold historic and other memorabilia to raise funds for the property. When it became impossible to continue to run the nonprofit out of this location, the Martins' nonprofit group, Jenney Grist Mill, took over management of the property.

Plimoth Plantation acquired the mill in late 2012. Starting in 2013, the mill was renamed the Plimoth Grist Mill and has since been described as a fully operational grist mill and historical tourist destination. The brook that the mill sits on also hosts an annual spring festival which draws thousands of people to witness alewives traveling to their breeding grounds. Since the early 2000s, significant efforts have been made to grow the number of fish, which have drastically dwindled since the 1620s. This has resulted in increased counts, from roughly 7,000 alewives in 2003, to nearly 200,000 in 2016.

Open to the public most months of the year, the mill processes corn, wheat, rye, and barley, although only corn is ground on the primary millstones. The milling process is a public spectacle for visitors, with workers intertwining their milling duties with explanations about the craft to those present. Cornmeal and grits are the primary products, with much of the product wholesaled to numerous business in the region to help promote the growing movement towards minimally-processed local foods. On March 11, 2017, the Southeastern Massachusetts Agricultural Partnership held "the first state-wide grain gathering in the 21st century" at the Plimoth Grist Mill.
