= List of Mayflower passengers who died in the winter of 1620–21 =

Forty-five of the 102 Mayflower passengers died in the winter of 1620–21, and the Mayflower colonists overall suffered greatly during their first winter in the New World, chiefly from lack of shelter, scurvy, and general conditions on-board ship. They were buried on Cole's Hill.

People marked * below were probably buried in unmarked graves in the Cole's Hill Burial Ground in Plymouth, Massachusetts. In 1921, some of the remains of persons buried on that hill were collected into the sarcophagus that is the Pilgrim Memorial Tomb on Cole's Hill in Plymouth. Many of the people listed here are named on the Tomb.

== Men ==
- John Allerton*
- Richard Britteridge*, December 21
- William Butten/Button, November 6/16 on board Mayflower. Buried either at sea or later possibly ashore. Memorial in Provincetown. (a young man)
- Robert Carter*, after February 21
- James Chilton*, 8/18 on board Mayflower in Cape Cod Harbor. Most likely buried ashore. Memorial in Provincetown. Signer of the Mayflower Compact.
- Richard Clarke*
- John Crackstone Sr.*
- Thomas English* hired to master a shallop but died in the winter.
- Moses Fletcher*
- Edward Fuller*
- John Goodman*, there are conflicting reports regarding Goodman's death, with records of his name appearing in 1623
- William Holbeck*
- John Langmore*
- Edmund Margesson*
- Christopher Martin*, January 8
- William Mullins*' February 21
- Degory Priest*, January 1
- John Rigsdale*
- Thomas Rogers*
- Elias Story*
- Edward Thompson, December 4/14 on board Mayflower in Cape Cod Harbor. Most likely buried ashore. Memorial in Provincetown.
- Edward Tilley*
- John Tilley*
- Thomas Tinker*
- John Turner*
- William White*, February 21, 1621.
- Roger Wilder*
- Thomas Williams*

== Women ==
- Mary (Norris) Allerton*, of Newbury, England, wife of Isaac Allerton, died February 25, 1621. Remains later interred in Pilgrim Memorial Tomb, Cole's Hill, Plymouth, Massachusetts
- Dorothy (May) Bradford, December 7/17 drowned while the Mayflower was anchored in Cape Cod Harbor; her body was never recovered; memorial in Provincetown
- Mrs. James Chilton*
- Sarah Eaton*
- Mrs. Edward Fuller*
- Mary (Prower) Martin*
- Alice Mullins*, February 22–28
- Alice Rigsdale*
- Agnes (Cooper) Tilley*
- Joan (Hurst) Tilley*
- Mrs. Thomas Tinker*
- Elizabeth (Barker) Winslow*, March 24. Remains later interred in Pilgrim Memorial Tomb, Cole's Hill, Plymouth, Massachusetts
- Rose Standish* January 29

== Children ==
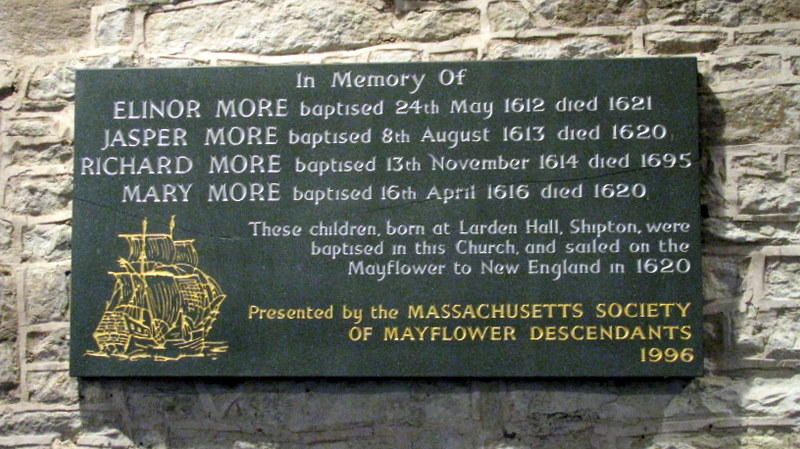
Mayflower plaque in St. James Church in Shipton, Shropshire commemorating the More children baptism. courtesy of Phil Revell

- Elinor (Ellen) More, age 8 died in Plymouth January 1621. She died of the disease pneumonia. Name is on the Pilgrim Memorial Tomb, Cole's Hill, Plymouth, Massachusetts.
- Jasper More, age 7, died on board the Mayflower on December 6, 1620. Buried ashore in the Provincetown area.
- Mary More, age 4 died in the winter of 1620. Location of her remains unknown. Name is represented on the Pilgrim Memorial Tomb, Plymouth, Massachusetts.
- Joseph Mullins*, age 14, February 22–28
- Solomon Prower*, age ca. 14–17, December 24
- the son of Thomas Tinker*
- both sons of John Turner*

== Statistics by month ==
=== Winter ===
According to Bradford's Register, a contemporary source

- November, 1
- December, 6
- January, 8
- February, 17
- March, 13

=== Spring ===
- April uncertain, between 1 and 5 (including Governor John Carver, not in above list)
- May or June, at least 1 (Mrs. Katherine (White) Carver*, not in above list)

Four deaths occurred in the months before the first Thanksgiving, bringing the total deaths to between 51 and 56.

== See also ==
- List of Mayflower passengers who died at sea November/December 1620

== Notes ==
- The article is based on the List of deaths and dates as shown in Chronological History of New England by Thomas Prince in 1737, from the register of deaths compiled by William Bradford, which was lost during the Revolutionary War. The list can be seen in the article "Mayflower passenger deaths, 1620-1621".
