= Butten (surname) =

Butten is a surname. Notable people with the surname include:

- Anwen Butten (born 1972), Welsh international bowls competitor
- William Butten (died 1620), servant of Samuel Fuller
