= John Turner (Mayflower passenger) =

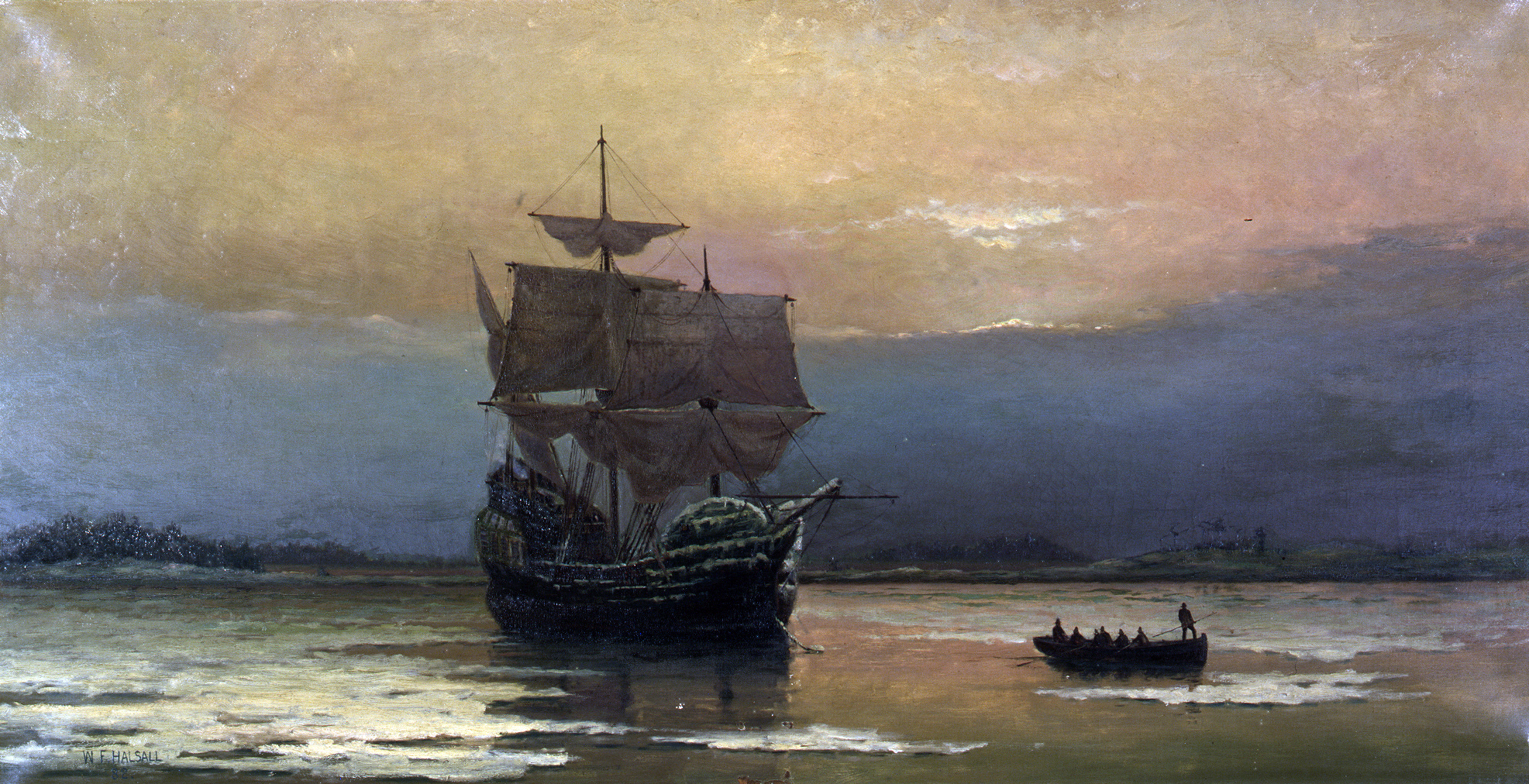
Mayflower in Plymouth Harbor by William Halsall (1882)

John Turner (1563 – winter of 1620/21) was a passenger, along with his two sons, on the 1620 voyage of the historic Pilgrim ship the Mayflower. He was a signatory to the Mayflower Compact and perished, that first winter.

== English Origins ==
Very little is known about his life in England, especially his origins. It is believed he may have come from Great Yarmouth in co. Norfolk, where there were several Turner families.

== Life in Leiden ==
Per Banks, Turner may have been of the original Pilgrim contingent emigrating to Leiden in 1610 with Bradford and Brewster as in that year, John Turner, merchant, was recorded being admitted as a burgess (political official) of Leiden.

He was of the Separatist church and is known to have lived in Leiden in 1610 and later with the record of him of September 27, 1610 in that city when he guaranteed the citizenship of Peter Boey and William Lisle. Turner was referred to as being a merchant during his time in Holland.

Turner was involved in the Holland-England trade and in that capacity often carried letters between those Leideners in London and Holland. Records indicate that on June 10, 1620, John Turner did deliver a letter from the Leiden congregation to Robert Cushman, their chief agent in London. A few days later Turner returned to Leiden with letters as well as first-hand information from Cushman.

Middelburg, Holland, located in Zeeland, was the center of the English business community and John Turner, being the concierge of the English merchant's house, was responsible for the transport of their mail. His name is found in the customs records in the transport of cargoes of English beer and pewter from London to Holland.

== On the Mayflower ==
Per William Bradford, John Turner traveled on the Mayflower accompanied by his two sons, Edward Aaron Turner and unknown.

John Turner departed Plymouth, England on the Mayflower on September 6/16, 1620. The small, 100-foot ship had 102 passengers and a crew of about 30-40 in extremely cramped conditions. By the second month out, the ship was being buffeted by strong westerly gales, causing the ship's timbers to be badly shaken with caulking failing to keep out sea water, and with passengers, even in their berths, lying wet and ill. In addition, a lack of proper rations and unsanitary conditions for several months, attributed to what would be fatal for many, especially the majority of women and children. On the way there were two deaths, a crew member and a passenger, but the worst was yet to come after arriving at their destination when, in the space of several months, almost half the passengers perished in cold, harsh, unfamiliar New England winter.

On November 9/19, 1620, after about 3 months at sea, including a month of delays in England, they spotted land, which was the Cape Cod Hook, now called Provincetown Harbor. After several days of trying to get south to their planned destination of the Colony of Virginia, strong winter seas forced them to return to the harbor at Cape Cod hook, where they anchored on November 11/21.

John Turner was a signatory to the Mayflower Compact on November 11, 1620, but not his sons, who were yet to be of age.

== In Plymouth ==
John Turner died the first winter in Plymouth. By this time three other complete families had perished – the Martins, the Rigsdales, and the Tinkers.

In addition to his two sons, John Turner also had a daughter Elizabeth, who apparently remained in Leiden after the Mayflower sailed. Elizabeth Turner later came to New England sometime before October 1635.

== Family of John Turner ==
John Turner and his wife had three children:

- ___Edward Aaron__ Turner (son), born around 1608
- _____ Turner (son), born around 1616 and died in Plymouth Colony in the winter of 1620/1.
- Elizabeth, born around 1620, traveled to Salem and married. No further information is known.

William Bradford wrote of this family in 1651: "John Turner, and *2* sons. He had a daughter come some years after to Salem, where she is now living."

And Bradford wrote of their fate:

"John Turner and his *2* sones all dyed in the first sicknes. But he hath a daughter still living at Salem, well married, and approved of."

== Death and burial ==
Nothing is known of the dates of death of John Turner and his sons, other than they died sometime in the winter of 1620/21. John Turner was buried in Cole's Hill Burial Ground in Plymouth, presumably in an unmarked grave as with most Mayflower passengers who died in that first winter. His sons may have also been buried in Cole's Hill Burial Ground. They are all memorialized on the Pilgrim Memorial Tomb on Cole's Hill as "John Turner and two sons."
