= John Crackston =

English Separatist from Holland

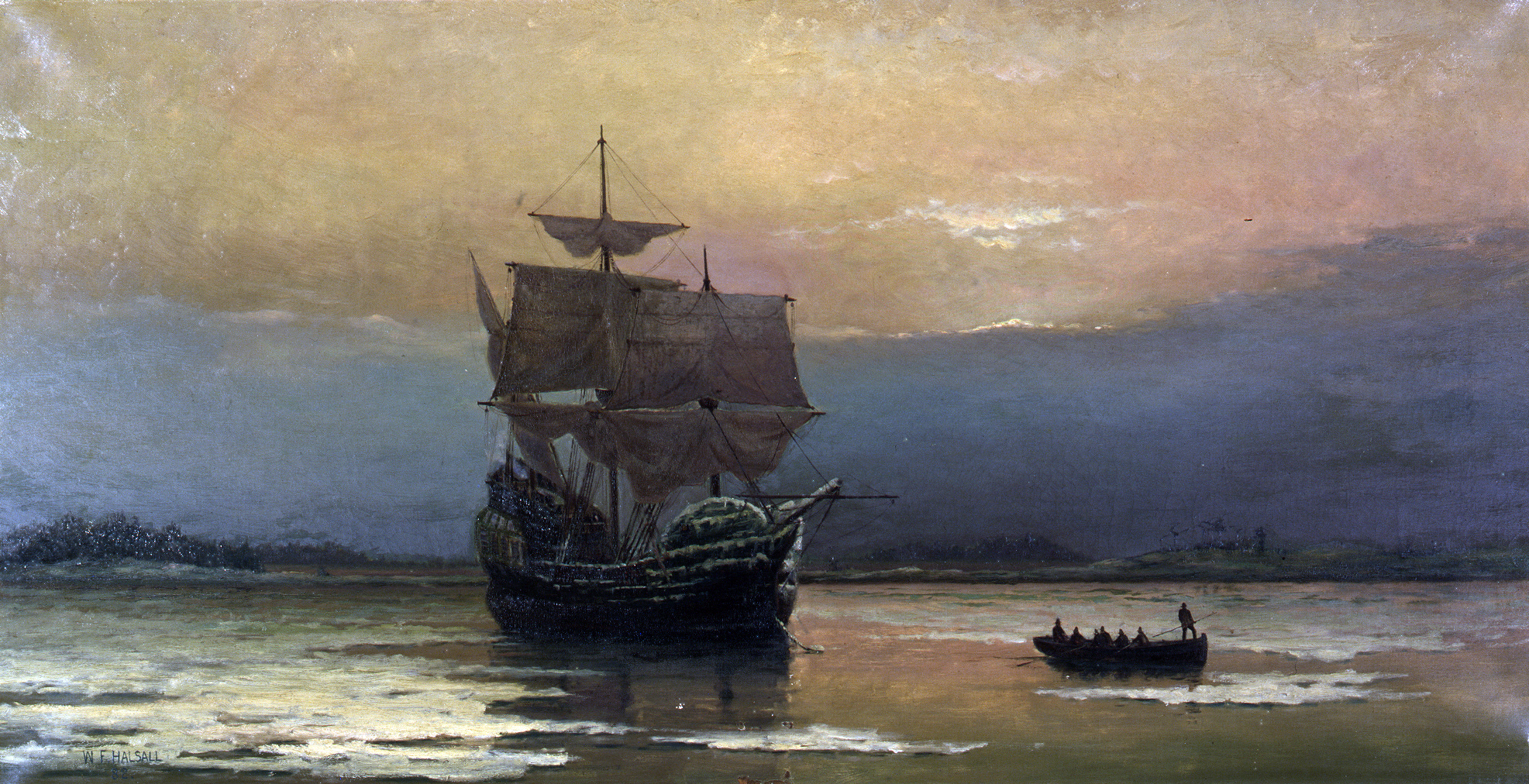
Mayflower in Plymouth Harbor by William Halsall (1882)

John Crackstone (surname also spelled as Craxston or Crakstone; c. 1575 – c. 1620/21) was an English Separatist from Holland who came with his son John on the historic 1620 voyage of the Pilgrim ship Mayflower. He was a signatory to the Mayflower Compact, but perished with the first Pilgrims to die the winter of 1620, exact date unknown. His son John later died in his twenties.

== English origins ==
His birth year of about 1575 is based on his daughter's marriage date. He is believed to have come to Holland from Colchester in co. Essex, England. In the 1618 Leiden marriage record of his daughter Anna, she is noted in records as being a spinster from Colchester.

== In Leiden ==
The name of John Crackston, English Separatist residing in Leiden Holland, first appears in Leiden records on June 16, 1616, when, along with future fellow Mayflower passenger Moses Fletcher, they being witnesses to the betrothal of Zachariah Barrow. Leiden records also state that on May 19, 1617, he was the groom's witness for the betrothal of Henry Collet to Alice Thomas.

Crackston's daughter Anna (Anne) married Thomas Smith in Leiden on December 12, 1618, to which he is also recorded as being a witness. At her wedding she was accompanied by her friend Patience Brewster, later to be a Mayflower passenger in the family of her father, Elder William Brewster. Patience was to die of a fever In Plymouth in 1634 as the first wife of colony governor Thomas Prence.

== Mayflower voyage ==
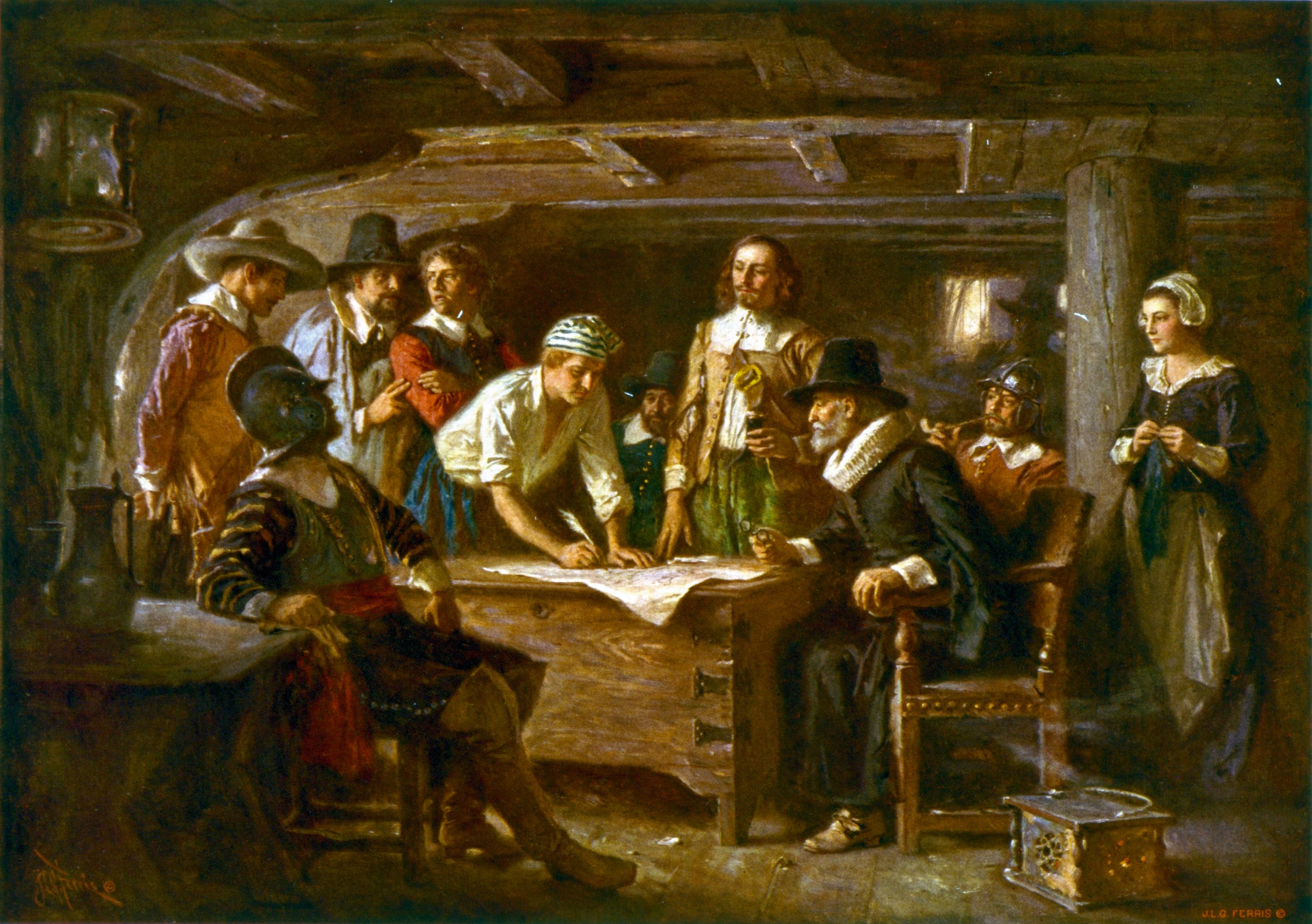
Signing the Mayflower Compact 1620, a painting by Jean Leon Gerome Ferris 1899

In 1620 John Crackston came to the Mayflower with the Leiden contingent in the company of his son John. It is believed that his wife, name unknown, may have been deceased and therefore the reason his son was with him on the voyage without his mother. His daughter Anna had married in 1618 and did not accompany them. Plymouth Colony governor, writing 1651, recorded Crackston and his son embarked on the Mayflower: "John Crakston, and his sone, John Crakston."

The Mayflower departed from Plymouth, England aboard the Mayflower on September 6/16, 1620. The small, 100-foot ship had 102 passengers and a crew of about 30-40 in extremely cramped conditions. By the second month out, the ship was being buffeted by strong westerly gales, causing the ship's timbers to be badly shaken with caulking failing to keep out sea water, and with passengers, even in their berths, lying wet and ill. This, combined with a lack of proper rations and unsanitary conditions for several months, attributed to what would be fatal for many, especially the majority of women and children. On the way there were two deaths, a crew member and a passenger, but the worst was yet to come after arriving at their destination when, in the space of several months, almost half the passengers perished in cold, harsh, unfamiliar New England winter.

On November 9/19, 1620, after about three months at sea, including a month of delays in England, they spotted land, which was the Cape Cod Hook, now called Provincetown Harbor. And after several days of trying to get south to their planned destination of the Colony of Virginia, strong winter seas forced them to return to the harbor at Cape Cod hook, where they anchored on November 11/21.

John Crackston was a signatory to the Mayflower Compact. His son John Jr. was apparently not yet twenty-one years of age and did not sign the Compact.

== Family of John Crackston ==
Crackston may have married sometime prior to 1600, probably in England where his wife also may have died, as there is no mention of her in Leiden records. Her name is unknown.

Children of John Crackston and _______:

- Anna (Anne) Crackston was born about 1600, probably in Colchester, co. Essex, England. She married Thomas Smith, presumed to be English, in Leiden on December 22, 1618. No descendants of this marriage have been identified.
- John Crackston (Jr.) was born about 1602, also presumably in England. He never married. He is believed to have died of a fever in the winter 1627-1628 brought on by frostbite caused by being lost in the forest. Per Bradford, John Crackston Jr. died five or six years after their arrival on the Mayflower although it was probably later than that as he appears in the 1627 Division of Cattle, appearing as "John Crakstone" with the Allerton family. His name also appeared in the 1623 Division of Land as "John Crackston" with the Winslow family. It is believed that John Crackston Jr. died sometime after the 1627 Division of Cattle, possibly the next winter. His burial place is unknown.

== Death and burial of John Crackston ==
John Crackston (Sr.) died sometime in the winter of 1620, per William Bradford among the first Mayflower passengers to die, although a later date is also given. The exact date is unknown. As with most passengers who died that winter, he was most likely buried in an unmarked grave in Cole's Hill Burial Ground, Plymouth. He is memorialized on the Pilgrim Memorial Tomb on Cole's Hill as "John Craxston Sr."

In 1651, William Bradford recollected about the fate of John Crackston and his son John: "John Crakston dyed in the first mortality, and about some *5* or *6* years after, his son dyed; having lost him selfe in the wood, his feet became frozen, which put him into a fever, of which he dyed."
