= List of Mayflower passengers who died at sea November/December 1620 =

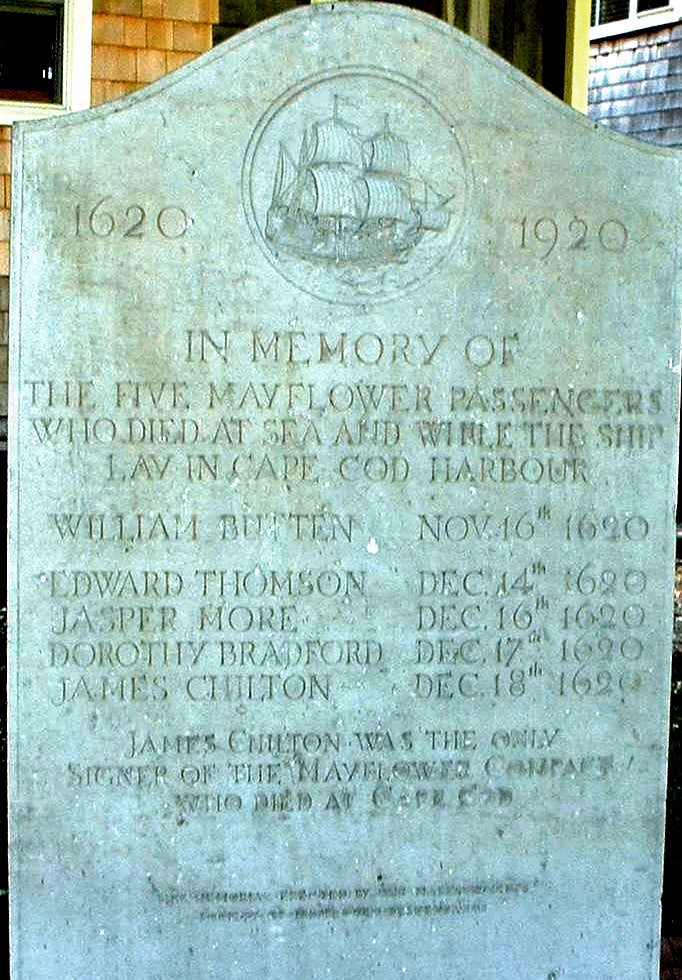
Provincetown, Massachusetts memorial to Pilgrims who died on board the Mayflower in November/December 1620

There were five Mayflower passengers who died at sea in November/December 1620. Those passengers were followed by a larger number who perished in the bitter first winter of 1620-21.

The deaths of those persons are unique in Mayflower history as they occurred either at sea just before reaching Cape Cod or while the Mayflower was at anchor at the Cape Cod harbor for several weeks in what would later be called Provincetown Harbor. These shipboard deaths are the first deaths of the Mayflower company and were just a precursor of many more deaths to come. By about mid-December 1620, it was decided that the company would settle at the location which was named Plymouth and eventually all on the Mayflower moved ashore, where nearly half of the passengers later died in the first winter.

The five persons and their dates of death were:

- William Butten (Button), November 16;
- Edward Thompson (Thomson), December 14;
- Jasper More, December 16;
- Dorothy Bradford, December 17;
- James Chilton, December 19.

== Brief history of the passengers who died at sea ==
- William Butten (Button). He was the first Mayflower passenger to die, dying at sea November 6/16, just three days before the coast of New England was sighted. He was believed to have been sick for much of the two-month voyage. Bradford recorded: "in all this voyage there died one of the passengers, which was William Butten, a youth, servant to Samuel Fuller, when they drew near the coast".

He was a "youth," as noted by William Bradford and a servant of Samuel Fuller, who was a longtime member of the Leiden (Holland) church and a doctor for the colonists. William was an indentured servant which may indicate that his father died while he was young and his mother may have been unable to care for him financially. He was not a signatory of the Mayflower Compact.

- Edward Thompson (Thomson). He died December 4/14, 1620, and was the first person to die after the Mayflower arrived in America. This was several weeks before the Pilgrims located and made plans to settle at Plymouth. He was a servant of William White and died shortly after arrival at Cape Cod harbor. White also died early, in February 1621. Thompson left no known family nor is anything known of his ancestry. It is known that he was young and not yet 21, as he did not sign the Mayflower Compact.

As with William Butten, Thompson most likely was also buried ashore on Cape Cod, although some information states he was buried at Burial Hill in Plymouth, which belies the fact that Plymouth settlement was not established at the time of his death. He is named on the Pilgrim Memorial Tomb, Coles Hill, Plymouth as "Edward Thompson".

- Jasper More. He was a 7-year-old boy from Shropshire and a servant of John Carver. Jasper was one of the children in the bizarre case of the four young More children, ages 4 to 8, who were put on the Mayflower by their ostensible father, Samuel More, after he discovered or believed that they were not his children, but were the product of adultery with a neighbor. They were forcibly taken from their mother, kept away from her for over four years and then were, without her knowledge, given over to those on the Mayflower to be sent to Virginia colony as indentured servants. Bradford recorded (441, 443) that Jasper died "of the common infection" on 6/16 December. His two sisters, Elinor and Mary, were also on the Mayflower and in the care of Edward Winslow and William Brewster, respectively. Both girls died that winter, with only their brother Richard More, in the care of William Brewster, surviving. It is believed that Jasper More may also have been buried ashore on Cape Cod.
- Dorothy Bradford from Wisbech, Isle of Ely. She was about 23 years old and the wife of Pilgrim William Bradford, having married him in Holland in 1613 when she was 16. She had one son, John, who did not travel on the Mayflower.

On December 7/17, she possibly slipped, falling from the deck of the Mayflower and drowning in the icy water of Cape Cod harbor. This happened while her husband was with an expedition ashore. Upon returning, Bradford learned the sad news that "his dearest consort" had accidentally fallen overboard and drowned.

- James Chilton. He was about 64 years old and a Separatist from Leiden. He died on December 8/18 and William Bradford wrote that he died in the First Sickness, which also took the life of Chilton’s wife several weeks later in January 1621. Their daughter Mary survived them to live a long life in Plymouth. James Chilton also was most likely buried ashore on Cape Cod in an unmarked grave. His wife is recorded as being buried in Coles Hill Burial Ground in Plymouth. She is commemorated on the Pilgrim Memorial Tomb, Coles Hill, Plymouth as "James Chilton's wife".

== Memorials for Mayflower passengers who died at sea ==
In 1921 an historic memorial tablet was dedicated in Provincetown by The Massachusetts Society of Mayflower Descendants honoring those who died while the Mayflower was at sea or anchored in Cape Cod Harbor in those very early weeks. The tablet commemorated the 300th anniversary of the Landing of the Pilgrims. The inscription was done using lettering from a 17th-century tombstone inscription as a model and its heading reads: "In memory of the five Mayflower passengers who died at sea while the ship lay in Cape Cod Harbour". All five of those earliest deaths are recorded on the historic memorial.

In 1920 there had been an earlier Provincetown Mayflower memorial to four of the five persons – Edward Thompson, Jasper More, Dorothy Bradford and James Chilton – which was erected at the Winthrop Street Cemetery and still exists today.
