= Thomas Rogers (Mayflower passenger) =

Mayflower passenger

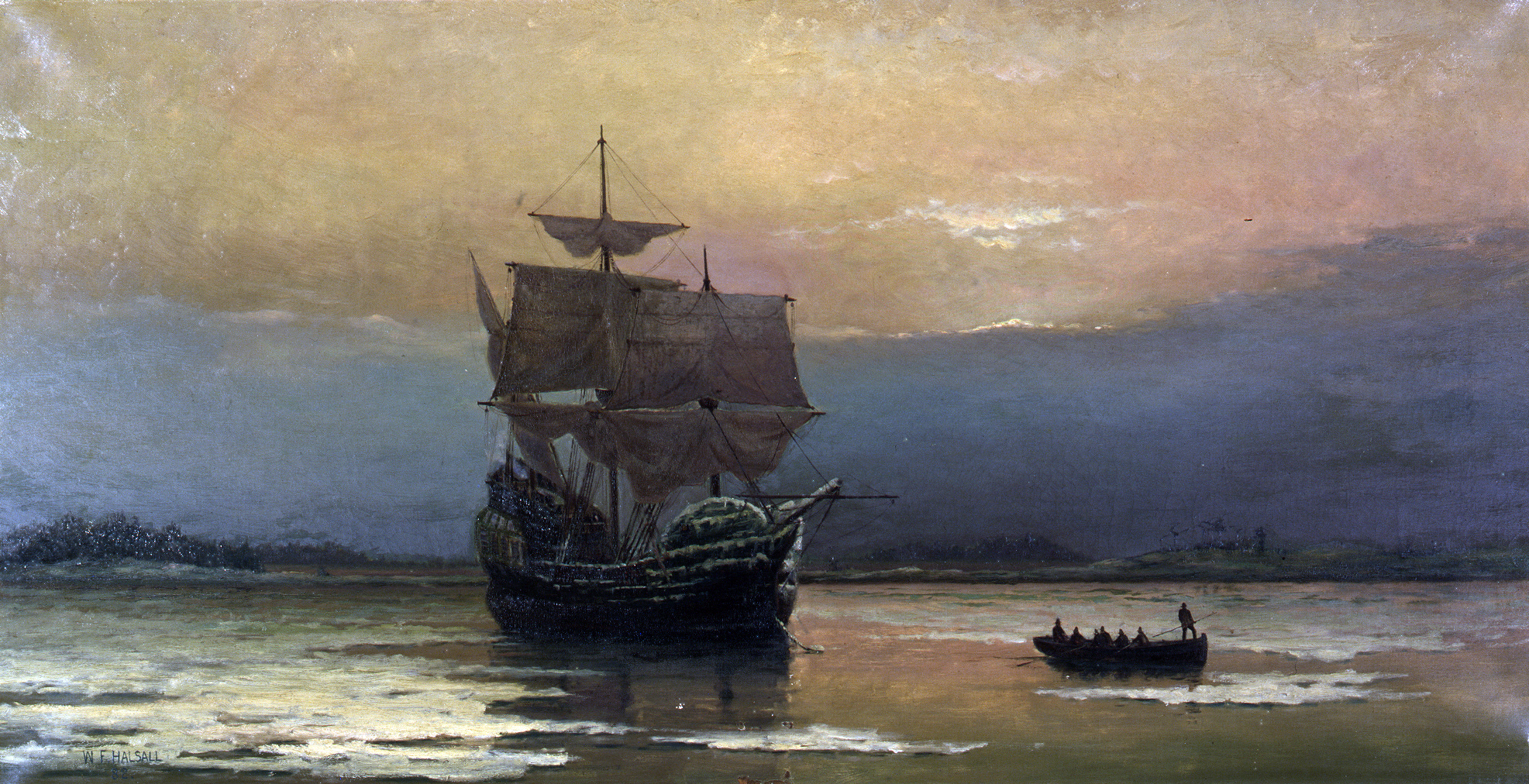
Mayflower in Plymouth Harbor by William Halsall (1882)

Thomas Rogers (c. 1571 – January 11, 1621) was a Leiden Separatist who traveled in 1620 with his eldest son Joseph as passengers on the historic voyage of the Pilgrim ship Mayflower.

Thomas Rogers was a signatory to the Mayflower Compact, but perished in the winter of 1620/21. His son Joseph, who at the age of 17 had travelled with Thomas on the Mayflower but had been too young to sign the Mayflower Compact, survived to live a long life.

== English origins ==
Thomas Rogers was born in the area of the village of Watford, in Northamptonshire, England, which has extensive history from the Roman, Dane, Viking and Saxon eras. His birth year of approximately 1571 is based on his date of marriage. Thomas Rogers was a son of William Rogers and his wife Eleanor. He married Alice Cosford in Watford parish October 24, 1597, with their six children being baptized there between 1598 and 1613. The family went to Leiden from England sometime after their last child, Margaret, was baptized in 1613.

== In Leiden ==
Thomas Rogers was a member of the English Separatist church and sometime after 1613, the last recorded baptism of his children, he, his wife, and children, moved to Leiden as members of the Separatist church there. The earliest Leiden record for Thomas Rogers notes that on February 14, 1614, he bought a house on Barabarasteeg from Jan Bloemsaer, a baker. Leiden records also notes that Rogers became a citizen of Leiden on June 25, 1618, guaranteed by Englishmen William Jepson from Worksop, Nottinghamshire and Roger Wilson of Sandwich, co. Kent. That record states that he was a merchant of camlet, a luxury Asian-type fabric made from a combination of silk and camel's hair.

Other Leiden records for Thomas Rogers show that in 1619, when he was preparing to sell his house in preparation for his departure from Leiden for America, he found that his property still had an outstanding lien on it, forcing him to sue Jan Bloemsaer, from whom he originally purchased the home, and bondsman Gerrit Gerritsz. He was finally able to sell his home on April 1, 1620, to Mordecheus Colven for three hundred guilders.

Per author Eugene Stratton, the 1622 Leiden poll tax listed the family of Thomas Rogers residing there in poverty, but apparently without his wife Alice.

== Mayflower voyage ==
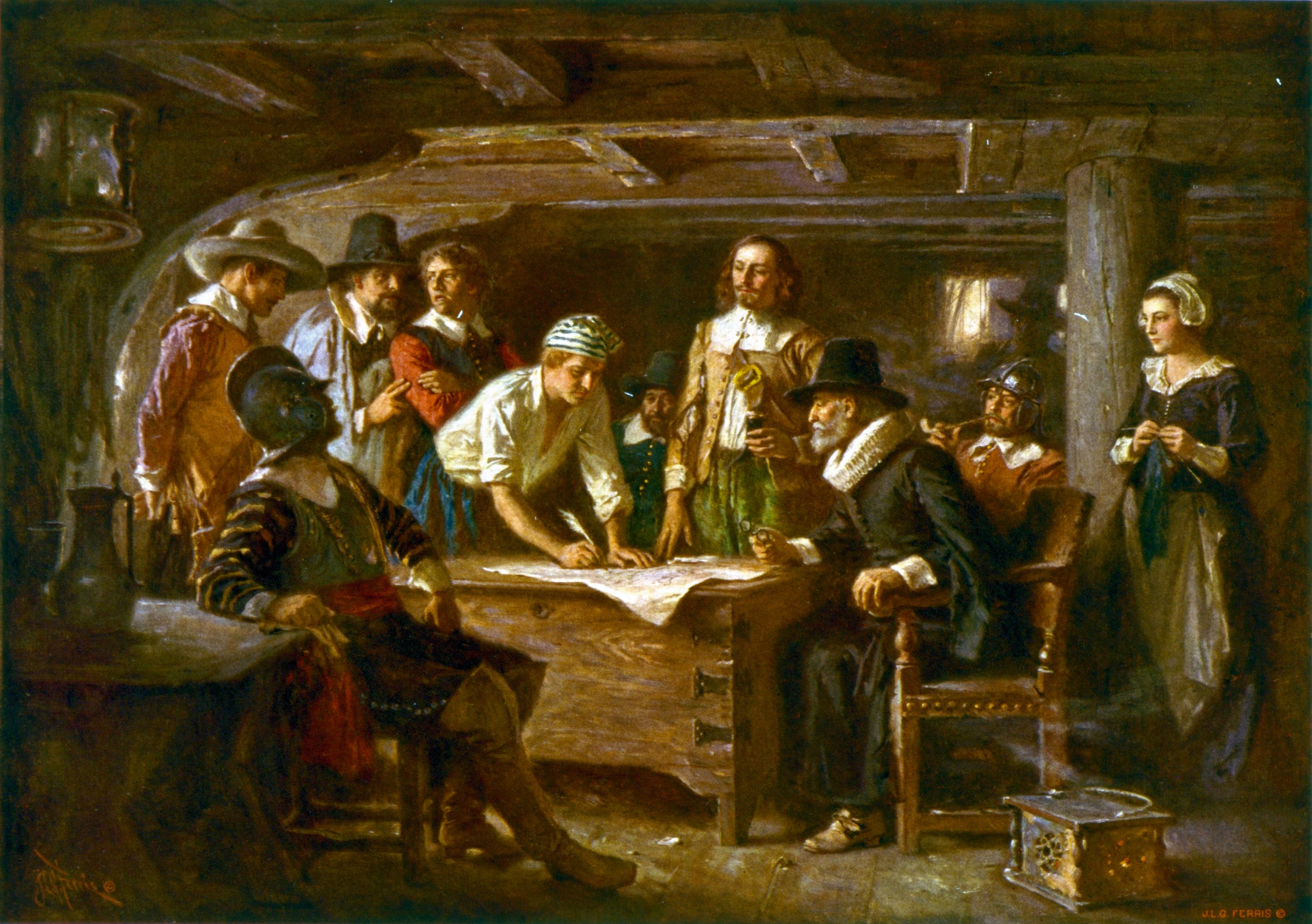
Signing the Mayflower Compact 1620, a painting by Jean Leon Gerome Ferris 1899

Thomas Rogers traveled on the Mayflower with only his eldest son Joseph, leaving behind in Leiden his wife and their three other children – John, Elizabeth and Margaret. In the 1622 poll tax for Leiden, Rogers' family were found among the poor of Leiden, residing at the rear of Anthony Clement's home. His possible second wife, who author Eugene Stratton lists as Elizabeth (or Elsgen) in the 1622 poll tax, may have died in Leiden sometime between 1622 and when his son John and possibly his daughters came to Plymouth sometime after 1627.

William Bradford's later recollection of Thomas Rogers and his son embarked on the Mayflower: "Thomas Rogers, and Joseph, his sone. His other children came afterwards."

Thomas Rogers and his 18-year-old son Joseph departed Plymouth, England aboard the Mayflower on September 6/16, 1620. The small, 100-foot ship had 102 passengers and a crew of about 30–40 in extremely cramped conditions. By the second month out, the ship was being buffeted by strong westerly gales, causing the ship's timbers to be badly shaken with caulking failing to keep out sea water, and with passengers, even in their berths, lying wet and ill. This, combined with a lack of proper rations and unsanitary conditions for several months, attributed to what would be fatal for many, especially the majority of women and children. On the way there were two deaths, a crew member and a passenger, but the worst was yet to come after arriving at their destination when, in the space of several months, almost half the passengers perished in cold, harsh, unfamiliar New England winter.

On November 9/19, 1620, after about three months at sea, including a month of delays in England, they spotted land, which was the Cape Cod Hook, now called Provincetown Harbor. After several days of trying to get south to their planned destination of the Colony of Virginia, strong winter seas forced them to return to the harbor at Cape Cod hook, where they anchored on November 11/21. The Mayflower Compact was signed that day.

Thomas Rogers was listed as the 18th signatory to the Mayflower Compact. The actual order of signatures is not known. His son Joseph was then about 18 years of age and could not sign the Compact.

== Family ==
Confusion had arisen related to the discovery by author Eugene Stratton of the listing of an "Elsgen Rogiers" in Leiden's 1622 poll tax records, where she is noted as the wife of Thomas Rogers. In her care were three of Thomas Rogers' children, who remained in Leiden after he departed on the Mayflower with his son Joseph. The children were listed as Jan Tomasz (John), Lysbeth (Elizabeth) and Grietgen (Margaret) Rogiers (Rogers). However, the name "Elsgen" is also the name used by Alice (née Carpenter), married to Separatist Edward Southworth, during their time in Leiden. Further, Alice Cosford Rogers is reported to have died shortly after the poll was taken on June 3, 1622, in Leiden. This, alongside the fact that the three youngest children listed with her were baptized in England, and the fact that their daughter Elizabeth's name while in Leiden was listed as "Lysbeth," point to the greater likelihood that "Elsgen" is Alice.

Thomas Rogers married Alice Cosford in the parish of Watford, Northamptonshire, England on October 24, 1597. She was baptized in Watford May 10, 1573 and was a daughter of George and Margaret (née Wills) Cosford. Both she and her husband Thomas were named in her father's will in 1608.

Children of Thomas and Alice Rogers:

Between 1598 and 1613 they had six children who were baptized in the parish of Watford, Northamptonshire, England.

- Thomas Rogers. Baptized March 24, 1598 and buried May 27, 1599.
- Richard Rogers. Baptized March 12, 1599 and buried April 4, 1600.
- Joseph Rogers. Baptized January 23, 1602 and came to Plymouth on the Mayflower with his father in 1620. He had eight children, most born in Duxbury. A wife "Hannah" is mentioned in his will, but it is not known when they married or if she is the mother of his children. He died in Nauset, now Eastham, on January 15, 1678, and was buried in Old Cove Burial Ground there.

Joseph Rogers was a notable person in Plymouth Colony. Over the years, he was involved in the founding of Bridgewater and Eastham. His name appears in the following colony records: 1623 Division of Land with Wm. Brewster - in the 1623 Plymouth Colony land division, Joseph Rogers was allotted two acres - one for himself and one on behalf of his late father; 1626 Purchasers list (colony investors); 1627 Division of Cattle with Wm. Bradford; 1633-34 Tax Lists – with his brother John on the 1633 list along with being a freeman that year; 1643 Able to Bear Arms List (with his brother John – with his surname given as "Roger"). In 1658, he was on the War Council of Plymouth Colony.

- John Rogers. Baptized April 6, 1606 and appeared on the Leiden poll tax list of 1622. He came to Plymouth from Leiden in 1630, possibly with Margaret and Elizabeth, his sisters. Worked as a weaver. On the Plymouth tax list for 1633 and the 1643 Able to Bear Arms List for Duxbury he was listed with his brother Joseph. He married Anna Churchman in Plymouth on April 16, 1639, and had six children: Abigail, John, Elizabeth, Edward, John, and Hannah. He died in Duxbury on August 27, 1691.
- Elizabeth Rogers. Baptized December 26, 1609. She is listed as "Lysbeth", the Dutch variant of Elizabeth, on the 1622 Leiden poll tax. She is believed to have come to New England sometime between 1627 and 1634. Possibly married Samuel Eddy.
- Margaret Rogers. Baptized May 30, 1613. She is listed as "Grietgen", the Dutch variant of Margaret, on the 1622 Leiden poll tax. She is believed to have come to New England sometime between 1627 and 1634.

Per author Caleb Johnson, about 1629 or 1630 Thomas Rogers' three children were residing in Leiden, John, Elizabeth and Margaret, and the remainder of the church members residing in Leiden, came to Plymouth at colony expense.

== Death and burial of Thomas Rogers ==
Thomas Rogers died sometime in the winter of 1620/21. His son Joseph survived and may have lived with Governor Bradford and family.

William Bradford's 1651 recollection of the fate of Thomas Rogers and his family: "Thomas Rogers dyed in the first sickness, but his son Joseph is still living, and is married, and hath *6* children. The rest of Thomas Rogers (children) came over, and are married, and have many children."

Thomas Rogers was buried, likely in an unmarked grave as with most Mayflower passengers who died in the first winter, in Cole's Hill Burial Ground in Plymouth. The name of Thomas Rogers is memorialized on the Pilgrim Memorial Tomb on Cole's Hill.
