= William Butten =

Mayflower passenger, died at sea

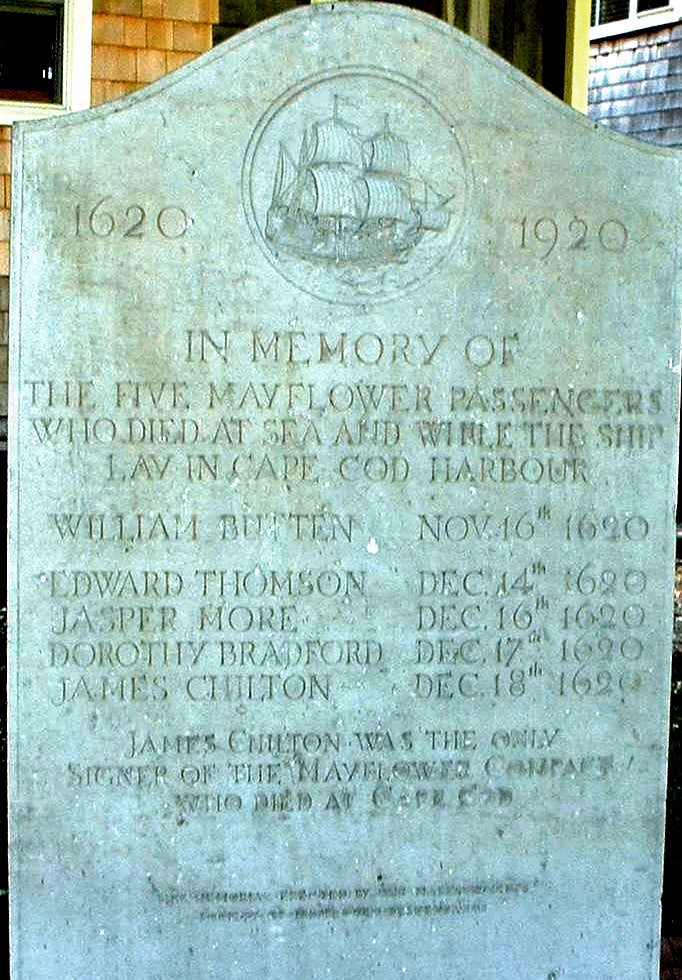
Provincetown, Massachusetts, memorial to Pilgrims who died on board the Mayflower in Nov./Dec. 1620

William Butten was a young indentured servant of Samuel Fuller, a long-time leader of the Leiden Church. Butten died during the voyage of the Mayflower while traveling with Fuller, who had been appointed doctor for the group. At that time, children and young men were routinely rounded up from the streets of London or taken from poor families receiving church relief to be used as laborers in the colonies. Butten was sick the entire voyage and died on November 6, 1620 at sea when near the coast of New England.

== Mayflower voyage ==
The Mayflower departed Plymouth, England, on September 6/16, 1620. The small, 100-foot ship had 102 passengers and a crew of about 30-40 in extremely cramped conditions. By the second month out, the ship was being buffeted by strong westerly gales, causing the ship's timbers to be badly shaken with caulking failing to keep out sea water, and with passengers, even in their berths, lying wet and ill. This, combined with a lack of proper rations and unsanitary conditions for several months, attributed to what would be fatal for many, especially the majority of women and children. On the way there were two deaths, a crew member and a passenger, but the worst was yet to come after arriving at their destination when, in the space of several months, almost half the passengers perished in cold, harsh, unfamiliar New England winter.

On November 9/19, 1620, after about three months at sea, including a month of delays in England, they spotted land, which was Cape Cod. After several days of trying to get south to their planned destination of the Colony of Virginia, strong winter seas forced them to return to the harbor at Cape Cod hook, where they anchored on November 11/21. The Mayflower Compact was signed that day. There were forty-one of the adult males, including the servants, who signed the Compact.

== Parentage ==
William Butten's parentage is a mystery. His name is of an ancient French heritage introduced in England after the Norman Conquest. He seemed to be a long-time member of the Leiden congregation and therefore was probably one of the Separatists. Upon the death of his father, his mother being too poor to support him, he became an indentured servant. One theory is that he may have been the son of Robert Butten and baptized in Austerfield 12 February 1598. Another version is that his family were members of the Separatist Community in Worksop, Nottinghamshire and was baptized March 13, 1605 there, near William Bradford and other Separatists.

Butten is memorialized on the Mayflower Passengers Who Died at Sea Memorial. A small residential road in Austerfield (postcode DN10 6SQ) is named Butten Meadow after him, where there is also a memorial artwork.

== See also ==
- List of Mayflower passengers who died at sea November/December 1620
