= Edward Fuller (Mayflower passenger) =

Mayflower passenger

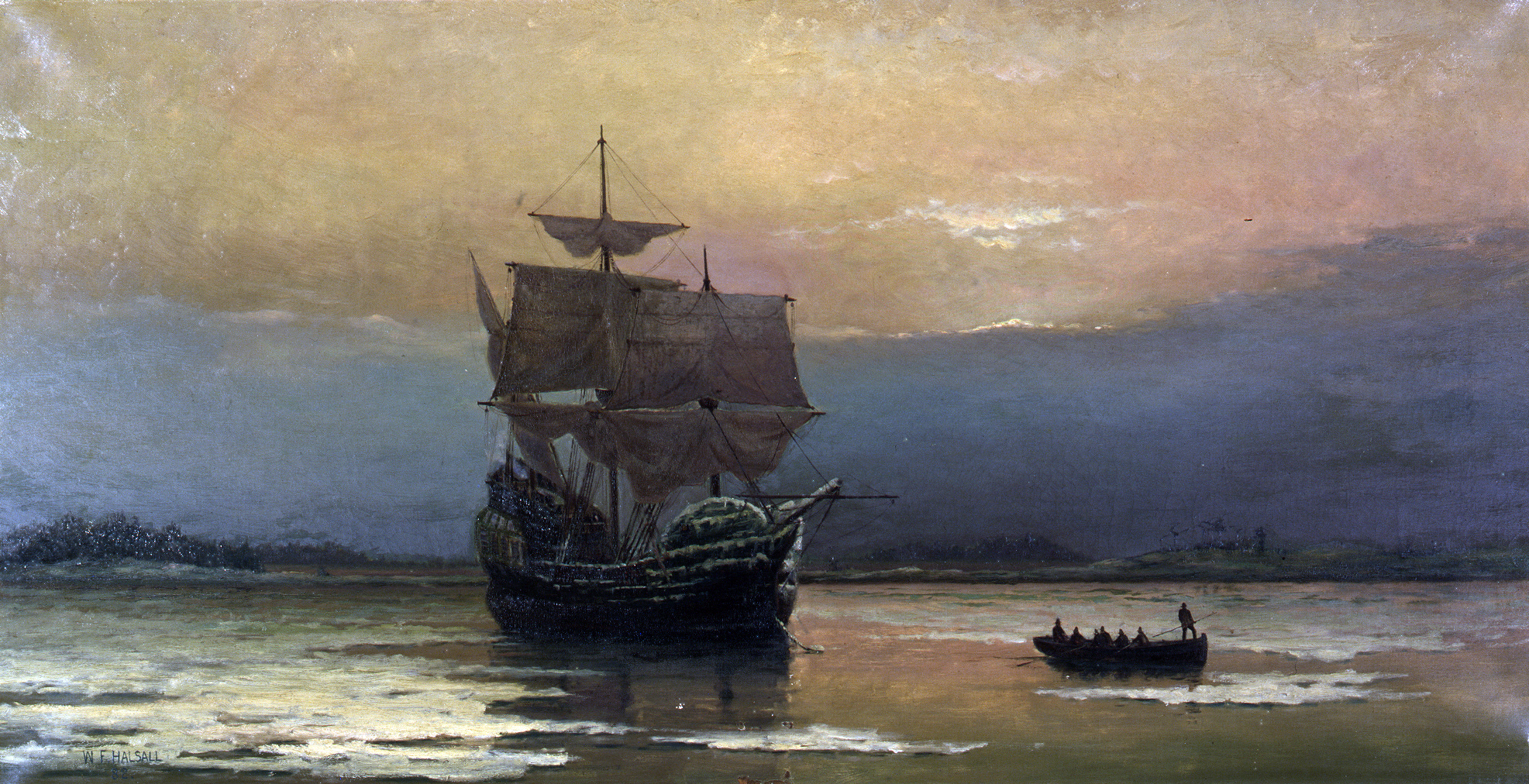
Mayflower in Plymouth Harbor by William Halsall (1882)

Edward Fuller (1575 – winter of 1620/21) was a passenger on the historic 1620 voyage of the ship Mayflower. He was a signatory to the Mayflower Compact and perished with his wife soon after the passengers came ashore to their new settlement at Plymouth.

== Biography ==
=== Early life ===
Fuller was baptised at Redenhall, in Norfolk, England, on 4 September 1575. He and his brother Samuel Fuller (c. 1580–1633), also a Mayflower passenger, were the sons of Robert Fuller, a butcher, and apparently of Robert's first wife Sarah Dunkhorn (she was buried at Redenhall on 1 July 1584). There is very little additional existing documentation on the life of Edward Fuller in England. His father, who died by early 1614, left a will, dated 19 May 1613, in which Edward is named as receiving some monies as well as his father's tenement, an inheritance which would take place after his step-mother Frances' death.

=== Life in Leiden ===
The names of Edward Fuller and his brother Samuel Fuller appear in a Leiden, Holland record, but there is no other information about his life in Holland.

=== The voyage to the New World ===
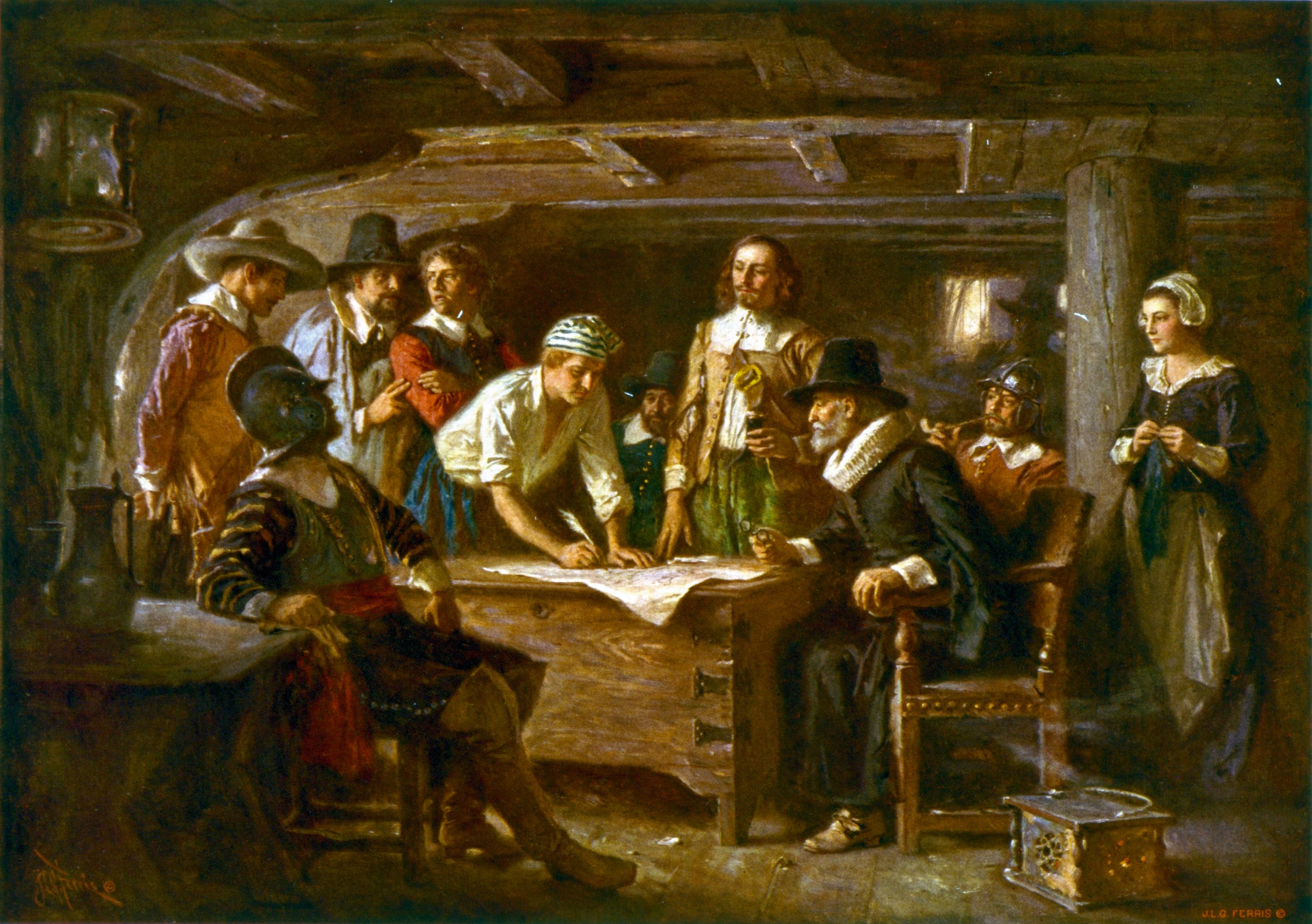
Signing the Mayflower Compact 1620, a painting by Jean Leon Gerome Ferris 1899

Edward Fuller boarded the Mayflower with his wife and a child. He had two known children, Matthew, born about 1605 (see below under Family where it is stated that DNA testing has shown that this wasn't his son), and Samuel, born about 1608. William Bradford, writing in 1651, recorded Mayflower passengers: "Edward Fuller, and his wife, and Samuell, their sonne."

The Mayflower departed from Plymouth, England on 6/16 September 1620. The small, 100-foot ship had 102 passengers and a crew of about 30–40 in extremely cramped conditions. By the second month out, the ship was being buffeted by strong westerly gales, causing the ship's timbers to be badly shaken. Caulking failed to keep out sea water and passengers, even in their berths, lay wet and ill. This, combined with a lack of proper rations and unsanitary conditions for several months, contributed to death for many, especially the majority of women and children. During the voyage there were two deaths, a crew member and a passenger, but the worst was yet to come when, after arriving at their destination, in the space of several months almost half the passengers perished in the cold, harsh, unfamiliar New England winter.

On 9/19 November 1620, after about 3 months at sea, including a month of delays in England, they spotted land, which was the Cape Cod Hook, now called Provincetown Harbor. After several days of trying to get south to their planned destination of the Colony of Virginia, strong winter seas forced them to return to the harbour at Cape Cod hook, where they anchored on 11/21 November. Edward Fuller was a signatory to the Mayflower Compact on 11/21 November 1620, along with his brother Samuel Fuller.

=== In Plymouth Colony ===
Plymouth Colony governor William Bradford's 1651 recollection of this family reads: "Edward Fuller and his wife dyed soon after they came ashore; but their sone Samuell is living, and married, and hath *4* children or more." After the deaths of Edward Fuller and his wife, their son Samuel, then about age twelve, was taken into the household of his uncle, Dr. Samuel Fuller.

=== Death and burial ===
Edward Fuller and his wife died, according to Bradford, sometime after the Plymouth settlement was established, likely between 11 January 1621 and March but the exact date was not recorded. They were buried in the Coles Hill Burial Ground in Plymouth, possibly in unmarked graves, as were so many who died that winter. They are memorialised on the Pilgrim Memorial Tomb on Coles Hill, as "Edward Fuller and his wife".

== Family ==
Edward Fuller was married in England sometime before 1605. His wife's first and maiden names are unknown. The couple had just one son, named Samuel. For many years it was thought they also had a son named Matthew, but in 2022 extensive yDNA testing conclusively proved that this cannot be true. In 2023 the Mayflower Society officially stopped accepting lines of descent through Matthew.

- Samuel Fuller was born c.1608. At his parents' demise, he came under the care of his uncle, Samuel Fuller, probably in very early 1621. In the 1623 Division of Land, he was listed as "Samuell fuller Junior" and in the 1627 Division of Cattle he was listed as "Samuell fuller Junior" with his uncle Samuel Fuller. He became a freeman in 1634 and married Jane Lathropp—daughter of the prominent Rev. John Lothropp—on 5/8 April 1635 in Scituate. They had nine children, though several died young. He moved to Barnstable by August 1641 and died there on 31 October 1683.
