= Moses Fletcher =

Leiden Separatist, Mayflower passenger

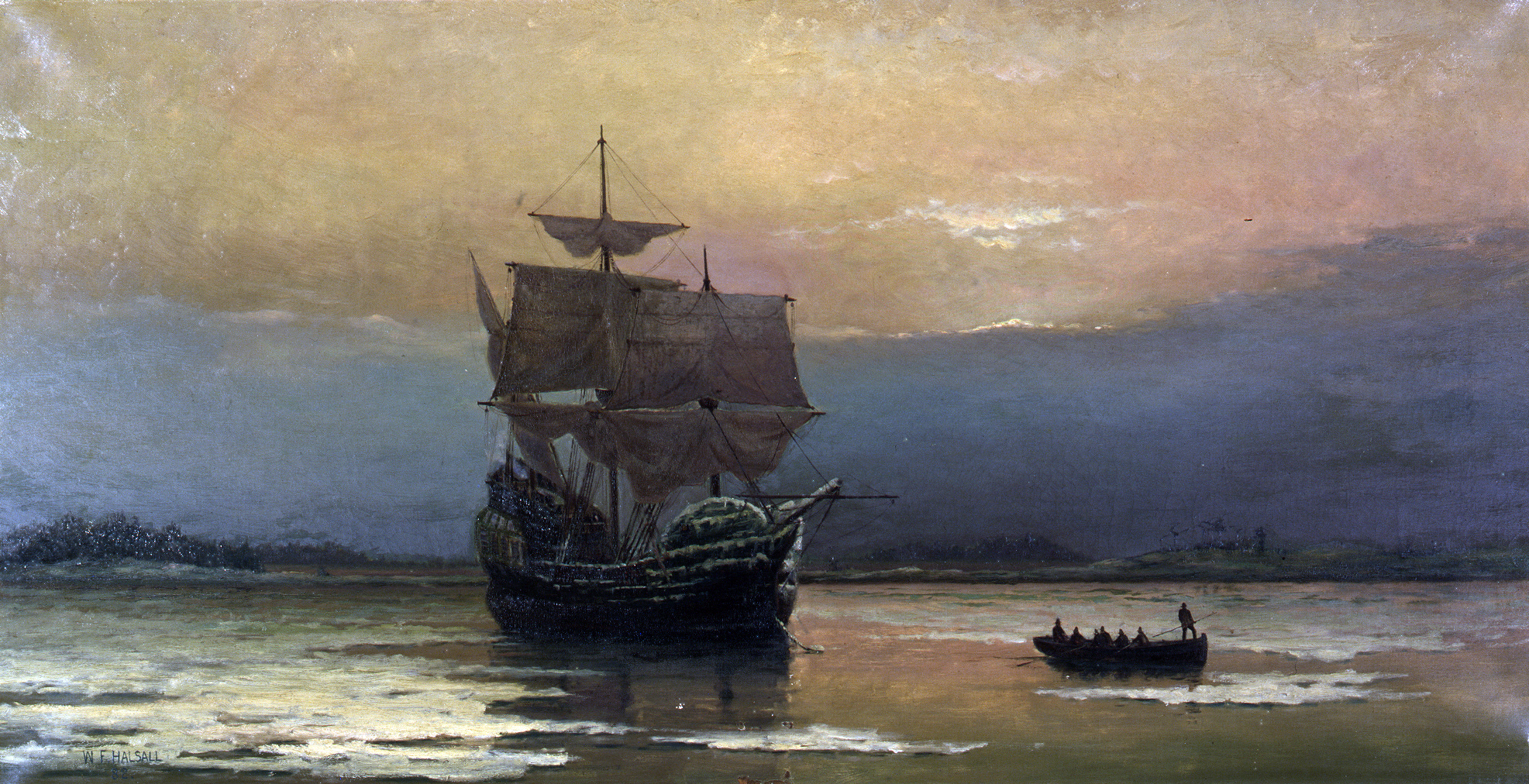
Mayflower in Plymouth Harbor by William Halsall (1882)

Moses Fletcher (in Pilgrim records written by William Bradford his name is given as Moyses Fletcher; c. 1564 – 1620/1) was a Leiden Separatist who came to America on the historic 1620 voyage of the Pilgrim ship Mayflower. He was a signatory to the Mayflower Compact and perished shortly thereafter in the Pilgrims' first winter in the New World.

== Life in England ==
Moses was born about 1564 in Kent County, England, probably in the Sandwich area. He seems to have lived much of his early life there, having married Mary Evans in 1589 and where all ten of his children were baptized. Per Banks, he was a smith by occupation with the parish register of St. Peter's, Sandwich providing information on his children's baptisms.

Although being a sexton of St. Peter's, Sandwich between 1604 and 1609, Fletcher found himself excommunicated by the church three times since by the early 1600s; he appears to have become involved in the Separatist movement. In 1609 he first found himself having a problem with church authorities when, on April 24 or 25, he was at the burial of a child of Andrew Sharpe which was considered an illegal burial as it was accomplished outside Church of England control. As recorded in church records, Fletcher and others were "calling into question the lawlessness of the king's constitutions in this and other behalfs, affirming these things(s) to be popishly ceremonious and of no other force." The Separatists considered Anglican burial ceremonies "popish" and that they sponsored idola. On June 12, 1609, Moses Fletcher, along with the wife of future fellow Mayflower passenger James Chilton and several other persons were excommunicated from the Anglican church for the supposedly illegal burial.

On November 6, 1609, Moses Fletcher was excommunicated again for burying his own daughter Judith, according to church records, was "in the sermon time very disorderly and unseemly." His final excommunication from the church was proclaimed to churchgoers on February 11, 1610.

== Life in Leiden ==
It appears that in or after 1610, Fletcher and his family departed Sandwich with the Chilton family and possibly others, traveling to Leiden in the Dutch Republic where they connected with the Separatist church which had been recently established there.

Fletcher's wife Mary seems to have died either just before or soon after the family moved to Leiden. He remarried in Leiden to Sarah, widow of William Denby on December 21, 1613. The marriage record notes that Fletcher was a blacksmith.

Leiden records for Moses Fletcher and his family show that in 1616 he witnessed the betrothal of Zachariah Barrow to Joan Barrow. Two years later, in 1618, Fletcher's eldest son John married in Leiden to Josina Sacharias, a Dutch woman. Two other of his children, Priscilla and Elizabeth, are recorded as having married in Leiden later.

== On the Mayflower ==
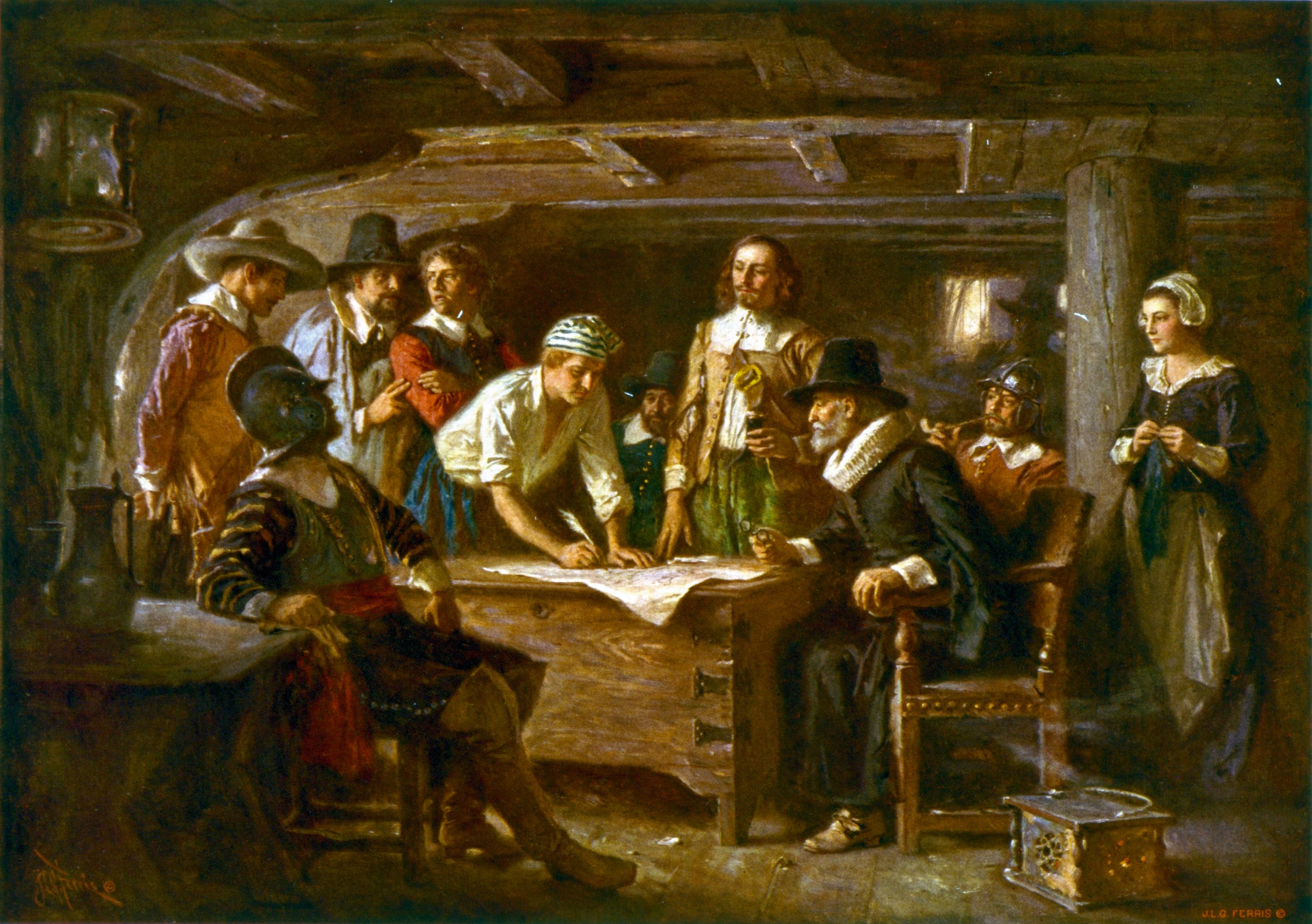
Signing the Mayflower Compact 1620, a painting by Jean Leon Gerome Ferris 1899

Moses Fletcher came on the Mayflower without his family. It is unknown if his second wife Sarah had been left in Holland with his children or if she had died by that time.

William Bradford notes Moses Fletcher as one of ten men traveling alone: "Moyses Fletcher, John Goodman, Thomas Williams, Digerie Preist, Edmond Margeson, Peter Browne, Richard Britterige, Richard Clarke, Richard Gardenar, Gilbart Winslow."

Moses Fletcher departed Plymouth, England aboard the Mayflower on September 6/16, 1620. The small, 100-foot ship had 102 passengers and a crew of about 30–40 in extremely cramped conditions. By the second month out, the ship was being buffeted by strong westerly gales, causing the ship's timbers to be badly shaken with caulking failing to keep out sea water, and with passengers, even in their berths, lying wet and ill. This, combined with a lack of proper rations and unsanitary conditions for several months, attributed to what would be fatal for many, especially the majority of women and children. On the way there were two deaths, a crew member and a passenger, but the worst was yet to come after arriving at their destination when, in the space of several months, almost half the passengers perished in cold, harsh, unfamiliar New England winter.

On November 9/19, 1620, after about three months at sea, including a month of delays in England, they spotted land, which was the Cape Cod Hook, now called Provincetown Harbor. And after several days of trying to get south to their planned destination of the Colony of Virginia, strong winter seas forced them to return to the harbor at Cape Cod hook, where they anchored on November 11/21. The Mayflower Compact was signed that day. Moses was a signatory to the Mayflower Compact and perished sometime in the first Pilgrim winter.

== Family ==
Moses Fletcher married:

(1) Mary Evans on October 30, 1589, at St. Peter's Church, Sandwich, Kent, England. They had ten children between about 1590 and about 1609, eight of whom were baptized at St. Peter's. She died sometime between 1609 and 1613 in either England or Holland. Her burial place is unknown.

(2) Sarah _____ Denby, widow of Englishman William Denby, in Leiden on December 21, 1613. Moses Fletcher was about age forty-nine years old at this time. There are no children recorded from this marriage. There is no date of her death, which is believed to have been in Holland. Her burial place is unknown.

Of his children, only John, Priscilla and Elizabeth are known to have married. None of the children are known to have come to the New World.

Children of Moses and Mary Fletcher, all baptized at St. Peter's Church in Sandwich, Kent:

- Mary, baptized January 4, 1589/90. No further record.
- John, born about 1592. Married Josina Sarcharias, in Leiden December 5, 1618. Had at least four children. He died after February 13, 1656.
- Catherine, baptized September 1, 1594. No further record.
- Richard, baptized January 2, 1596/7. No further record.
- Priscilla was baptized on March 24, 1599/1600.

Her marriages:
1. Married in Leiden on April 4, 1626 Timothy Coit as his second wife. They had four children.
2. Married on June 1, 1637 Help or Solomon Terry. They had one daughter.
3. Married on July 29, 1652 Jan Janzoon Vermont.

- Moses, baptized October 10, 1602. Died as an infant - buried April 21, 1603.
- Elizabeth was baptized on April 4, 1604, and was still living September 28, 1677.

Her marriages:
1. Married in Leiden Casper Barnaart.
2. Married on May 21, 1636 Michiel Voorchoren. They had four children.

- Jane, baptized February 8, 1606/7. No further record.
- Moses, baptized April 2, 1609. No further record.
- Judith, died as an infant - buried on November 6, 1609, at St. Peter's, Sandwich.

== Death and burial of Moses Fletcher ==
Moses died sometime in the winter of 1620–1621. William Bradford recorded his death and that of other male passengers traveling alone: "Moyses Fletcher, Thomas Williams, Digerie Preist, John Goodman, Edmond Margeson, Richard Britterige, Richard Clarke. All these died soon after their arrival, in the general sickness that befell. But Digerie Preist had his wife and children sent hither afterwards, she being (John) Allerton's sister. But the rest left no posteritie here."

Moses Fletcher was buried in the Cole's Hill Burial Ground in Plymouth probably in an unmarked grave as were many of those Mayflower passengers who died that first winter. His name is memorialized on the Pilgrim Memorial Tomb on Coles Hill in Plymouth.

== Descendants of Moses Fletcher ==
At his death, he left ten children, with later research determining he had thirteen grandchildren and twenty great-grandchildren in Holland. Robert S. Wakefield notes that it is reasonable to suppose he has descendants living in the Netherlands or elsewhere today. Dr. Jeremy D. Bangs of the Leiden Pilgrim Documents Center believes he has evidence of such descendants living in Holland today. None of Fletcher's descendants are known to have come to colonial New England.

The General Society of Mayflower Descendants lists fourteen members claiming descent from Moses Fletcher and his wife Mary. All of the lines are through his daughter Priscilla.
