= Thomas Tinker =

Early English colonist in North America

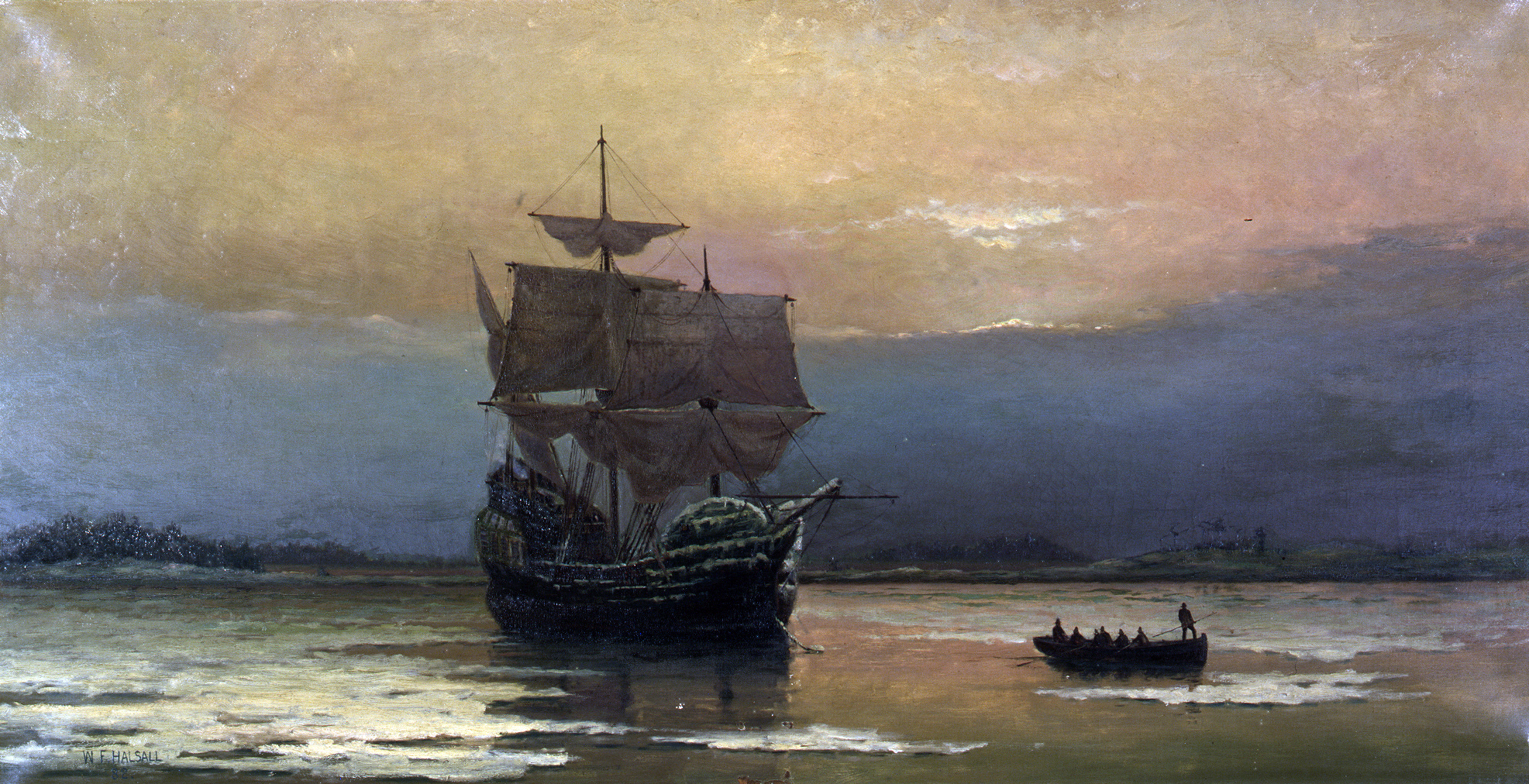
Mayflower in Plymouth Harbor by William Halsall (1882)

Thomas Tinker (c. 1581 – 1620/21) and his family, comprising his wife and son, came in 1620 as English Separatists from Holland on the historic voyage of the Pilgrim Ship Mayflower. He was a signatory to the Mayflower Compact but he and his family all perished in the winter of 1620/1621, described by Bradford as having died in "the first sickness."

== English origins ==
The English ancestry of Thomas Tinker is not certain – author Charles Banks believed that the most promising connection to Thomas Tinker of the Mayflower is a Thomas Tinker in the same field of work – carpenter, of Neatishead, co. Norfolk, born in 1581 at Thurne, co. Norfolk. Author Caleb Johnson reports this same Thomas Tinker married Jane White on June 25, 1609 in Thurne, co, Norfolk.

== In Leiden ==
It is known that Thomas Tinker was an English Separatist residing in Leiden, Holland in the early 1600s. However, the only time that his name appears in Leiden records is on January 6, 1617, when he became a citizen of that city. His profession was listed as wood sawyer. His guarantors, per the record of that event, were Abraham Gray and John Keble.

== On the Mayflower ==
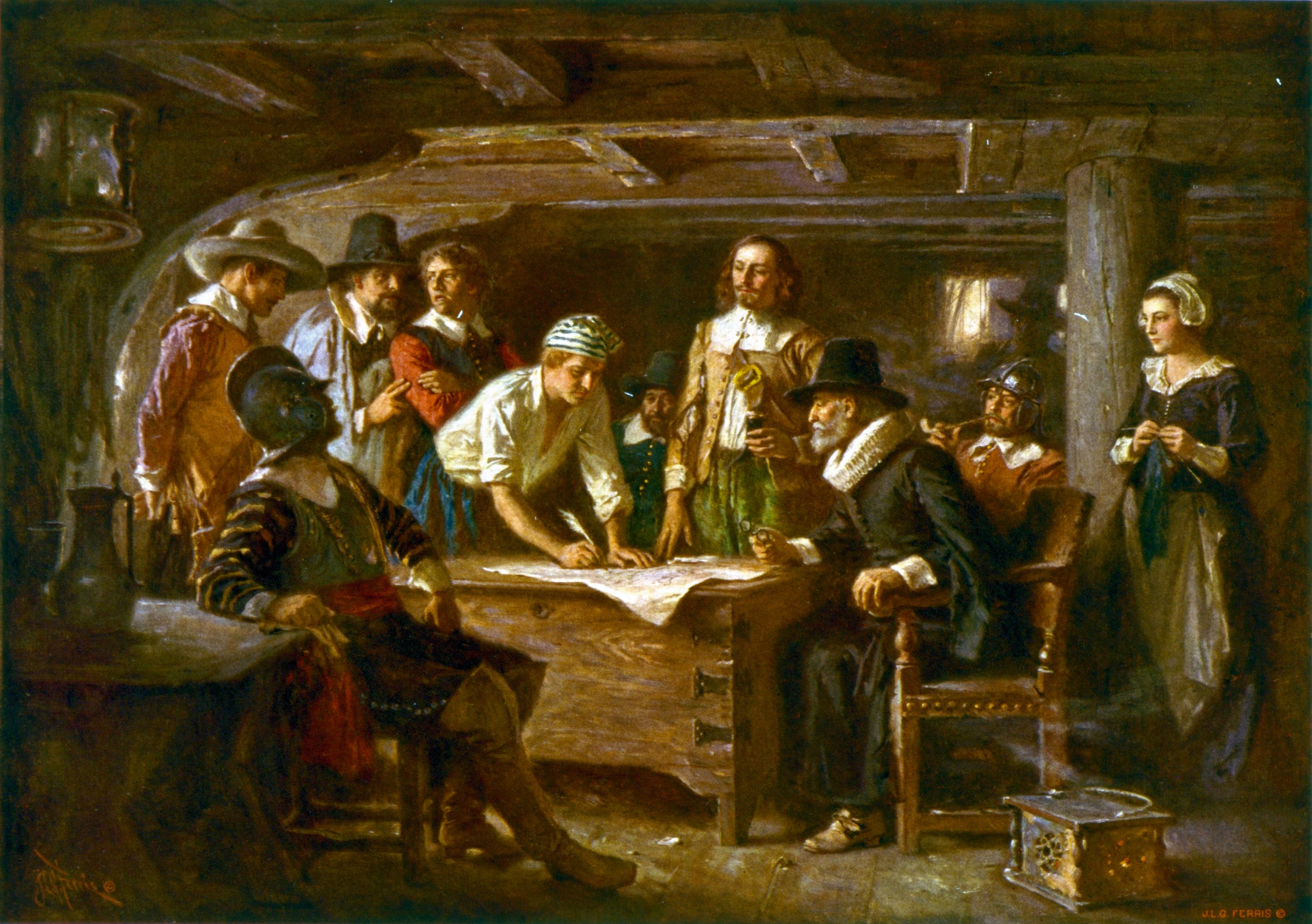
Signing the Mayflower Compact 1620, a painting by Jean Leon Gerome Ferris 1899

The Tinker family's embarkation on the Mayflower, per William Bradford states: "Thomas Tinker, and his wife, and a sone." The names of the wife and son are unknown.

The Mayflower departed Plymouth, England on September 6/16, 1620. The small, 100-foot ship had 102 passengers and a crew of about 30-40 in extremely cramped conditions. By the second month out, the ship was being buffeted by strong westerly gales, causing the ship's timbers to be badly shaken with caulking failing to keep out sea water, and with passengers, even in their berths, lying wet and ill. This, combined with a lack of proper rations and unsanitary conditions for several months, attributed to what would be fatal for many, especially the majority of women and children. On the way there were two deaths, a crew member and a passenger, but the worst was yet to come after arriving at their destination when, in the space of several months, almost half the passengers perished in cold, harsh, unfamiliar New England winter.

On November 9/19, 1620, after about three months at sea, including a month of delays in England, they spotted land, which was the Cape Cod Hook, now called Provincetown Harbor. After several days of trying to get south to their planned destination of the Colony of Virginia, strong winter seas forced them to return to the harbor at Cape Cod hook, where they anchored on November 11/21.

Thomas Tinker was a signatory to the Mayflower Compact.

== Family of Thomas Tinker ==
Per Johnson, this may be the same Thomas Tinker, carpenter, who married Jane White in Thurne, co. Norfolk, England on June 25, 1609

- ______ (son), possibly born sometime after 1609.

== Death of Thomas Tinker and his family ==
The dates of death of Thomas Tinker, his wife and son are unknown. Bradford used the term "died in the first sickness" for the family so presumption is made they died possibly in December 1620 or January 1621 when illness had become rampant. Thomas Tinker was buried in Cole's Hill Burial Ground in Plymouth, likely in an unmarked grave as with many passengers who died in the early days. His son is noted as being buried in Cole's Hill Burial Ground and the wife's burial is listed as unknown, but it is believed she also was buried at Cole's Hill. The family is memorialized on the Pilgrim Memorial Tomb on Cole's Hill as "Thomas Tinker his wife and son."

The fate of the Thomas Tinker family as recollected by William Bradford in 1651: "Thomas Tinker, and his wife and sone, all dyed in the first sicknes."
