= James Chilton =

Mayflower passenger and New World colonist (1556–1620)

- Born: c. 1556; Canterbury, Kent, England
- Died: December 8, 1620 (aged 63–64); Provincetown Harbor, Cape Cord, Massachusetts
- Occupation: Tailor
- Known for: Oldest passenger on the Mayflower, signer of the Mayflower Compact
- Children: 10, including Mary

James Chilton (c. 1556 – December 8, 1620) was a English-born Separatist and tailor who was a passenger on the historic 1620 voyage of the ship Mayflower and was the oldest person on board. Upon arrival in the New World, he was a signer of the Mayflower Compact. James Chilton was one of the earliest to die that winter, perishing within the following month.

== Life in England ==
Chilton was born about 1556 (age 63 in 1619) probably in Canterbury, Kent, England. The Chilton surname is an ancient one that appears in records from at least 1339, when his ancestor Robert Chilton was a Canterbury parliamentary representative.

His father was Lyonel Chilton.

James became a freeman in 1583 in Canterbury, and in a Canterbury Quarter Session in the next year, he was recorded as being a tailor.

Per Banks, in 1583 he was recorded as James "Chylton," citizen and tailor of Canterbury.

James Chilton married about 1586 (date based on his first child's baptism date). Research has not revealed the name of his wife, which was at one time thought to have been his stepsister, Susanna Furner, but recent research has found this not to be true. As far back as 1840 Nahum Mitchell's History of Bridgewater provided the given name of James' wife as "Susanna," but there is no solid documentary evidence to this claim.

James Chilton and his wife had seven children who were baptized in Canterbury, Kent between 1587 and 1589. About 1600 the family moved to Sandwich, also in Kent, where three more children were baptized.

It is believed that here James met Moses Fletcher, who was also a Mayflower passenger, as well as other Separatists who later went to Holland, and so became part of the English Leiden religious company. Sandwich was becoming a center of Separatist activity, and was home to several future members of John Robinson's Leiden church.

The first evidence that the Chilton family had its own Separatist views appears in 1609. In late April, Chilton's wife was among four people who secretly buried a dead child, without having the Church of England perform its mandatory burial rites.

== Life in Leiden ==
After the excommunication, sometime between 1609 and 1615, James Chilton and his family left England and joined John Robinson's congregation in Leiden, Holland. The first the family is heard from in Leiden is on July 2, 1615 when their eldest daughter Isabella married Roger Chandler. She is recorded as "Ysabel Tgiltron spinster from Canterbury." James Chilton's name was recorded for the first time in Leiden records on April 30, 1619 when he made a Leiden Remonstrant statement.

An incident involving James and a daughter was recorded in Leiden on April 28, 1619, when it was reported that as they were returning to their home, about twenty boys began throwing rocks at them. When Chilton confronted the crowd, he was struck in the head by a large cobblestone, and was knocked unconscious.

== On the Mayflower ==
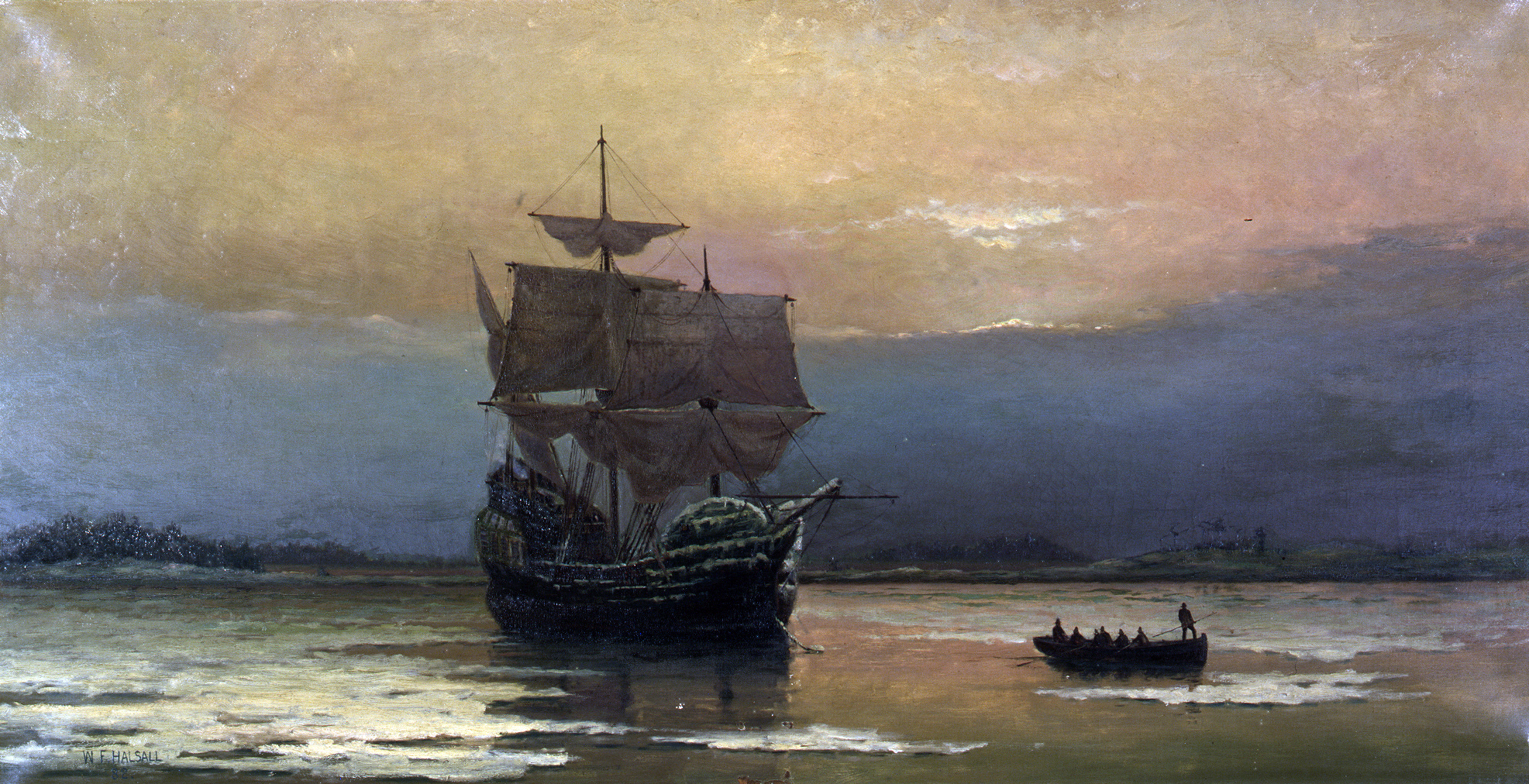
Mayflower in Plymouth Harbor by William Halsall, 1882

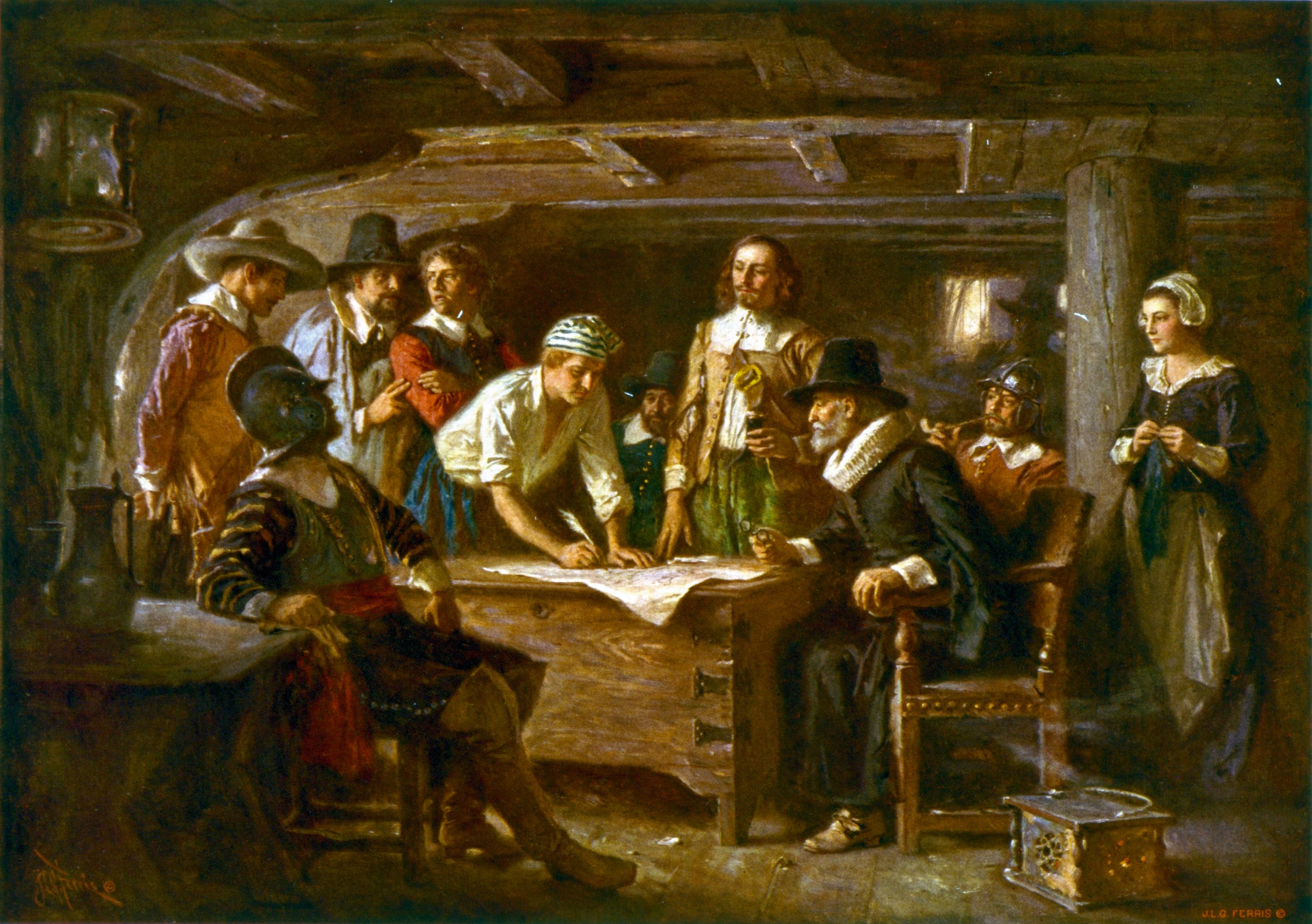
Signing the Mayflower Compact 1620, a painting by Jean Leon Gerome Ferris 1899

Not all members of the James Chilton family traveled on the Mayflower. The Chilton family on that ship consisted of James Chilton, age about sixty-four and the oldest Mayflower passenger, his wife and their daughter Mary, age about thirteen. Their daughters Isabella, married in 1615, and Ingle (Angel) stayed behind in Leiden. Isabella later came to Plymouth, but Ingle stayed in Leiden and married in 1622. She was still in Leiden in 1636, when she remarried. The records of their other children are not complete, although it is known that some died in infancy.

James Chilton and his family left Plymouth, England aboard the Mayflower on September 6/16, 1620. The small, 100-foot ship had 102 passengers and a crew of about 30-40 in extremely cramped conditions. By the second month out, the ship was being buffeted by strong westerly gales, causing the ship's timbers to be badly shaken with caulking failing to keep out sea water, and with passengers, even in their berths, lying wet and ill. This, combined with a lack of proper rations and unsanitary conditions for several months, attributed to what would be fatal for many, especially the majority of women and children. On the way there were two deaths, a crew member and a passenger, but the worst was yet to come after arriving at their destination when, in the space of several months, almost half the passengers perished in cold, harsh, unfamiliar New England winter.

On November 9/19, 1620, after about three months at sea, including a month of delays in England, they spotted land, which was the Cape Cod Hook, now called Provincetown Harbor. After several days of trying to get south to their planned destination of the Colony of Virginia, strong winter seas and a damaged ship forced them to return to the Cape Cod Hook where they anchored on November 11/21. Since there were no established laws where they landed they wrote the Mayflower Compact, which made rules on how they would live and treat each other. James Chilton was one of the signers

From Bradford's recollection about the Chilton family on the Mayflower: "James Chilton, and his wife, and Mary, their dougter. They had an other doughter, that was maried, came afterward."

From Bradford's recollection about the Chilton family in later years: "James Chilton and his wife also dyed in the first infection. But their daughter Mary is still living, and hath *9* children, and one daughter is maried, and hath a child; so their increase is *10*"

== Family ==
James Chilton married by 1586 and had ten children. Three of the daughters, Isabella, Ingel (Angel) and Mary survived to adulthood and married. Both Isabella, who came to Plymouth later, and Mary, who was a Mayflower passenger, are known to have descendants.

== Children ==
All children were born either in Canterbury or Sandwich (10 mi. distant) in Kent, England. Only three daughters, Isabella, Ingel, and Mary lived to maturity.

1 Isabella Chilton was baptized in 1586/7. She married Roger Chandler in Leiden, Holland on July 21, 1615 and had four children. There is no record of Isabella's death. Bradford's statement that Chilton had another daughter is the only proof that Isabella came to Plymouth. The family probably came to Plymouth in either 1629 or 1630 when Bradford states that "the rest of the Leiden contingent arrived." There is also an earliest tax record showing Roger Chandler March 25, 1633. Chandler is also shown in a record of those men able to bear arms in 1643, and a land record in 1644. He is also listed as a Freeman in 1648. Chandler died in Duxbury between 1658 and 1665. In October 1665, the land in Plymouth Colony (150 acres) is granted to the three unnamed daughters of Roger Chandler, deceased.

2 Jane Chilton was baptized June 8, 1589.

3 Joel Chilton was born about 1591 and buried in 1593.

4 Mary Chilton (first with that name) was born and died in 1593.

5 Elizabeth Chilton was baptized July 14, 1594.

6 James Chilton (the first with that name) was baptized August 22, 1596.

7 Ingel (Ingell) (Angel) Chilton was baptized on April 29, 1599. She married Robert Nelson in Leiden, Holland on August 27, 1622. She also married to Daniel Pietersz in Leiden on 26-3-1636 and to Matthijs Tilligem on 27-6-1637, witness was her sister Christina and her brother-in-law to be, Dionys van Steenstraten.

8 Christian was baptized on July 26, 1601. She was married to Joris Abrahamsz in Leiden on 16-05-1635, witness to this marriage was Engeltgen her sister and after the death of Joris she was married to Dionys van Steenstraten in Leiden on 16-1-1636.

9 James Chilton (the second with that name) was baptized on September 11, 1603.

10 Mary (the second with that name) was baptized on May 30, 1607. Her parents died early at Plymouth Colony. She was an orphan at age 13. In the 1623 land division, a "Marie" Chilton received shares for her parents' land. Since it is listed between Alden and Standish, it has been suggested that she lived with either of those two families. There is no record which states with whom she lived after her parents' death. Between July 1623 and May 22, 1627, she married John Winslow in Plymouth. They had ten children. John is listed as having arrived at Plymouth in 1621 aboard the Fortune. John and Mary are part of the records of the 1627 division of cattle. John died before May 21, 1674, which is the date his will is proved. Mary died before July 11, 1679 which is the date her will was proved.

== Death and memorial ==
Chilton died on December 8 (New Style 18), 1620. He was the only Mayflower Compact signer who died while the Mayflower was anchored at Cape Cod. There are three memorials to him in Provincetown. There is a small memorial plaque at Winthrop Street Cemetery, another in Pilgrims' First Landing Park (in the middle of the rotary at the extreme west end of Commercial Street), and the larger "Mayflower Passengers Who Died At Sea" memorial plaque at Bas Relief Park.

== See also ==
- List of Mayflower passengers who died at sea November/December 1620
