= Mayflower Compact =

First governing document of Plymouth Colony

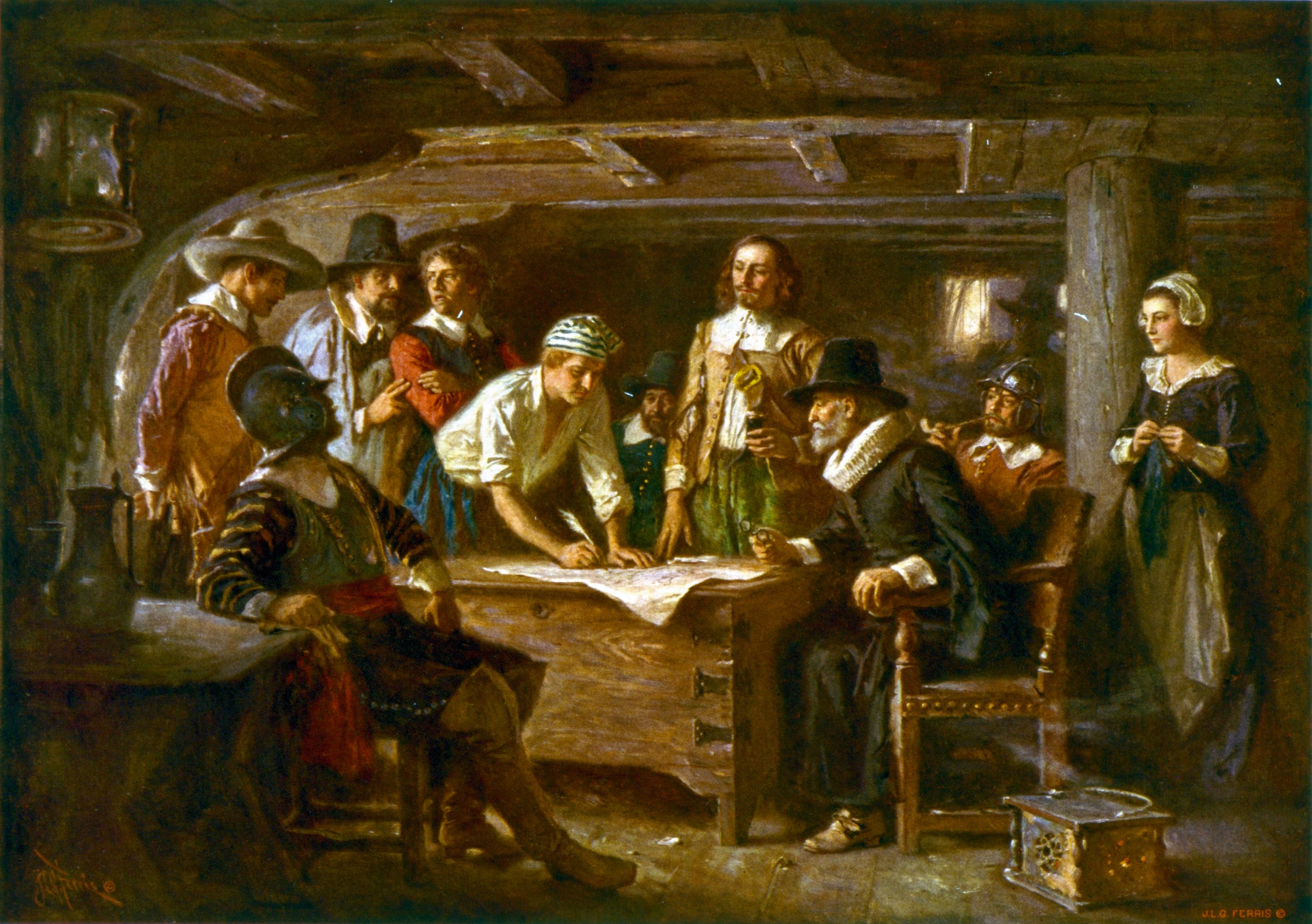
- Signing the Mayflower Compact 1620, an 1899 painting by Jean Leon Gerome Ferris
- Created: November 21 [O.S. November 11], 1620; 406 years ago
- Repealed: First repealed in 1686, reinstated in 1689, and repealed again in 1691
- Signatories: List of signatories

Full text
- Mayflower Compact at Wikisource

The Mayflower Compact, originally titled Agreement Between the Settlers of New Plymouth, was the first governing document of Plymouth Colony. It was written by the men aboard the Mayflower, consisting of Separatist Puritans, adventurers, and tradesmen. Although the agreement contained a pledge of loyalty to the King, the Puritans and other Protestant Separatists were dissatisfied with the state of the Church of England, the limited extent of the English Reformation and reluctance of King James I of England to enforce further reform.

The Mayflower Compact was signed aboard ship on November 21 [O.S. November 11], 1620. Signing the covenant were 41 of the ship's 101 passengers; the Mayflower was anchored in Provincetown Harbor within the hook at the northern tip of Cape Cod.

== History ==
The Pilgrims had originally hoped to reach America in early October using two ships, but delays and complications meant they could use only one, the Mayflower. Their intended destination had been the Colony of Virginia, with the journey financed by the Company of Merchant Adventurers of London. Storms forced them to anchor at the hook of Cape Cod in Massachusetts, however, as it was unwise to continue with provisions running short. This inspired some of the non-Puritan passengers (whom the Puritans referred to as "Strangers") to proclaim that they "would use their own liberty; for none had power to command them" since they would not be settling in the agreed-upon Virginia territory. To prevent this, the Pilgrims determined to establish their own government, while still affirming their allegiance to the Crown of England. Thus, the Mayflower Compact was based simultaneously upon a majoritarian model and the settlers' allegiance to the king. It was in essence a social contract in which the settlers consented to follow the community's rules and regulations for the sake of order and survival.

Similar arguments had been unsuccessfully made by the shipwrecked passengers of the Sea Venture, a similar, earlier group bound for the Colony of Virginia, and specifically by one Stephen Hopkins, who had, as a result, been convicted of mutiny and sentenced to death, but was pardoned, and is thought to be the Stephen Hopkins aboard the Mayflower and among the Compact signatories.

The Pilgrims had lived for some years in Leiden, a city in the Dutch Republic. Historian Nathaniel Philbrick states, "Just as a spiritual covenant had marked the beginning of their congregation in Leiden, a civil covenant would provide the basis for a secular government in America."

== Text ==
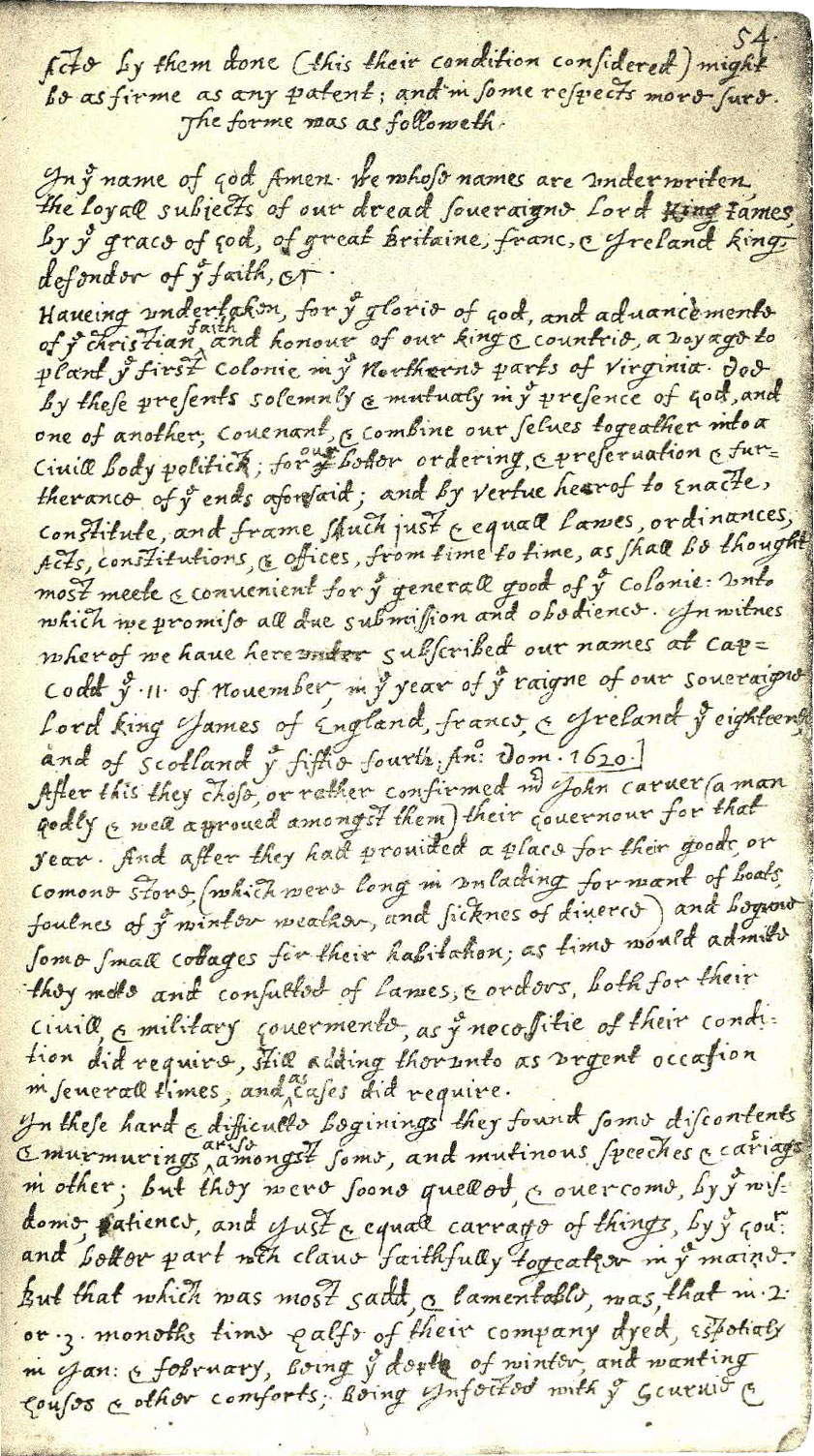
Bradford's transcription of the Compact

The original document has been lost, but three versions exist from the 17th century: printed in Mourt's Relation (1622), which was reprinted in Purchas his Pilgrimes (1625); hand-written by William Bradford in his journal Of Plimoth Plantation (1646); and printed by Bradford's nephew Nathaniel Morton in New-Englands Memorial (1669). The three versions differ slightly in wording and significantly in spelling, capitalization, and punctuation. William Bradford wrote the first part of Mourt's Relation, including its version of the compact, so he wrote two of the three versions. The wording of those two versions is quite similar, unlike that of Morton. Bradford's handwritten manuscript is kept in a vault at the State Library of Massachusetts.

The text as presented in modern sources is as follows:

IN THE NAME OF GOD, AMEN. We, whose names are underwritten, the Loyal Subjects of our dread Sovereign Lord King James, by the Grace of God, of Great Britain, France, and Ireland, King, Defender of the Faith, &c. Having undertaken for the Glory of God, and Advancement of the Christian Faith, and the Honour of our King and Country, a Voyage to plant the first Colony in the northern Parts of Virginia; Do by these Presents, solemnly and mutually, in the Presence of God and one another, covenant and combine ourselves together into a civil Body Politick, for our better Ordering and Preservation, and Furtherance of the Ends aforesaid: And by Virtue hereof do enact, constitute, and frame, such just and equal Laws, Ordinances, Acts, Constitutions, and Offices, from time to time, as shall be thought most meet and convenient for the general Good of the Colony; unto which we promise all due Submission and Obedience. IN WITNESS whereof we have hereunto subscribed our names at Cape-Cod the eleventh of November, in the Reign of our Sovereign Lord King James, of England, France, and Ireland, the eighteenth, and of Scotland the fifty-fourth, Anno Domini; 1620.

The document was signed on November 21 [O.S. November 11].

== Signers ==
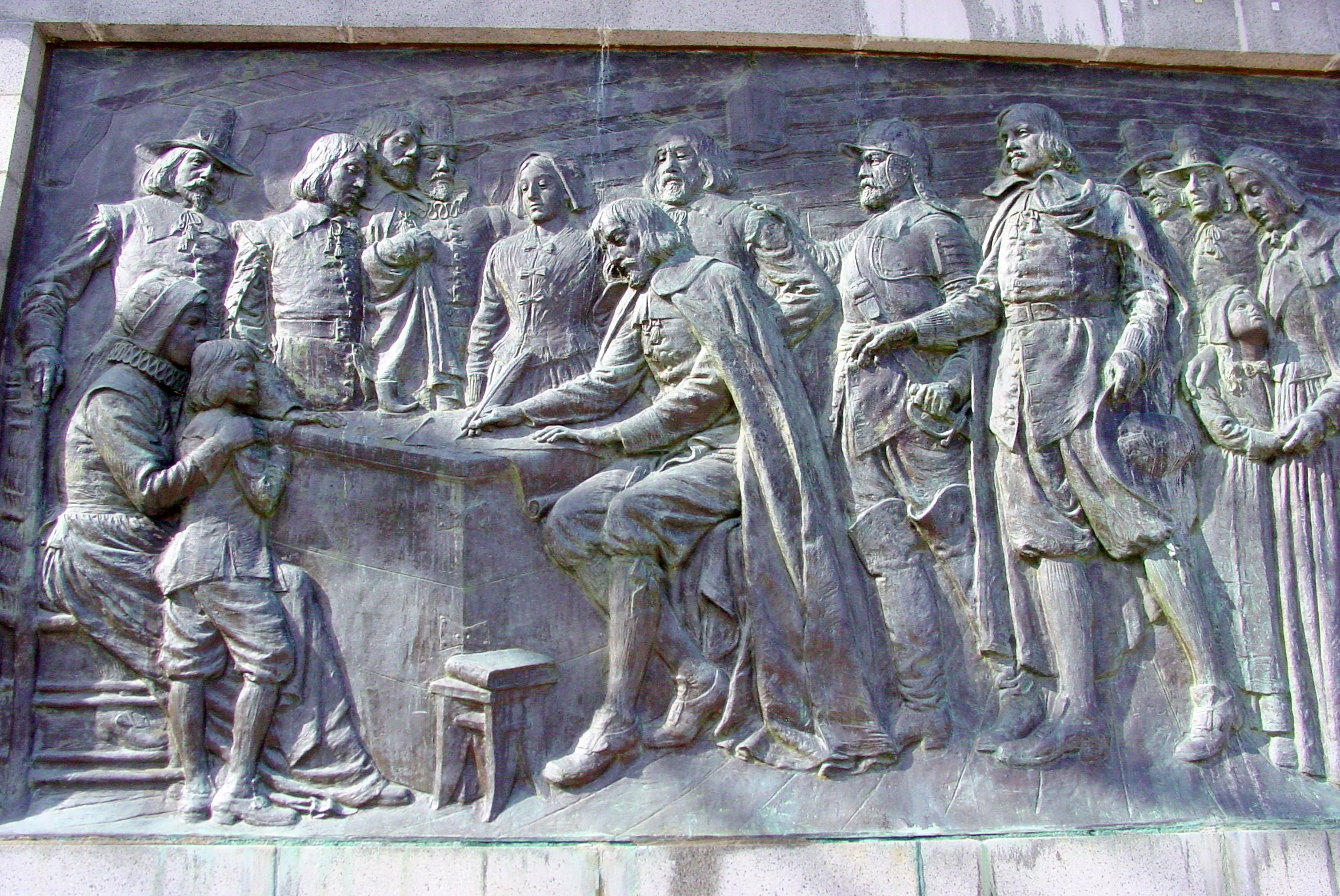
Signing of the Mayflower Compact Bas-relief by Cyrus Dallin at the Pilgrim Monument Provincetown, Massachusetts

A list of 41 male passengers who signed the document was supplied by Bradford's nephew Nathaniel Morton in his 1669 New England's Memorial. Thomas Prince first numbered the names in his 1736 A Chronological History of New-England in the form of Annals. The original document has been lost, so Morton is the sole source for the signers. He probably had access to the original document, but he could not have known the actual order in which it was signed simply by inspecting it. Morton's arrangement of names might not have been the arrangement on the original document, and the names on the original may not have been arranged in any orderly fashion. Prince's numbers are based solely on Morton, as he himself stated.

Morton's list of names was unnumbered and untitled in all six editions (1669–1855), although their order changed with successive editions. In his original 1669 edition, the names were placed on two successive pages forming six short columns, three per page. In subsequent editions, these six short columns were combined into three long columns on a single page in two different ways, producing two different orders in unnumbered lists of signers. The second (1721) and third (1772) editions changed the order of the first edition by combining the first and fourth columns into the first long column, and similarly for the other columns. The fifth (1826) and sixth (1855) editions returned the names to their original first edition order by combining the first and second short columns into the first long column, and similarly for the other columns. Prince numbered the names in their original 1669 Morton order. He added titles (Mr. or Capt.) to 11 names that were given those titles by William Bradford in the list of passengers at the end of his manuscript.

1. Mr. John Carver
2. William Bradford
3. Mr. Edward Winslow
4. Mr. William Brewster
5. Mr. Isaac Allerton
6. Capt. Myles Standish
7. John Alden
8. Mr. Samuel Fuller
9. Mr. Christopher Martin
10. Mr. William Mullins
11. Mr. William White
12. Mr. Richard Warren
13. John Howland
14. Mr. Stephen Hopkins
15. Edward Tilley
16. John Tilley
17. Francis Cooke
18. Thomas Rogers
19. Thomas Tinker
20. John Rigsdale
21. Edward Fuller
22. John Turner
23. Francis Eaton
24. James Chilton
25. John Crackstone
26. John Billington
27. Moses Fletcher
28. John Goodman
29. Degory Priest
30. Thomas Williams
31. Gilbert Winslow
32. Edmund Margeson
33. Peter Browne
34. Richard Britteridge
35. George Soule
36. Richard Clarke
37. Richard Gardiner
38. John Allerton
39. Thomas English
40. Edward Doty
41. Edward Leister

== Legacy ==
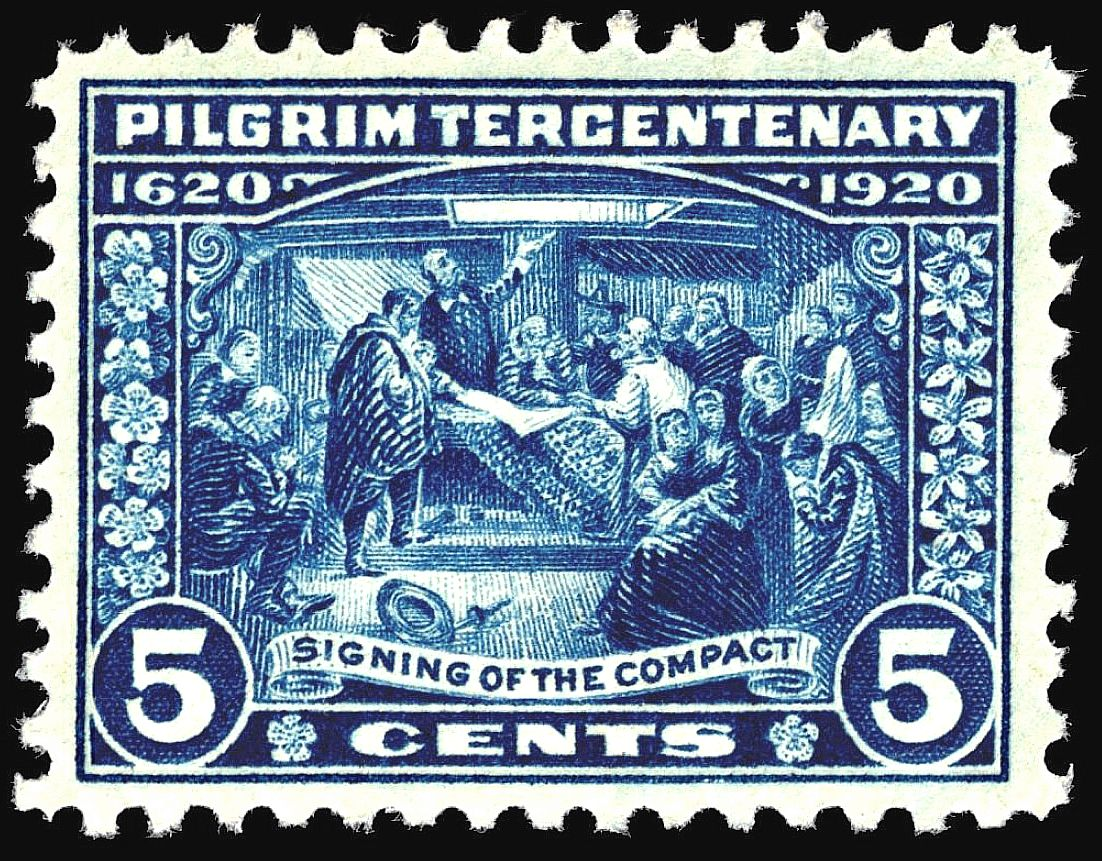
Commemoration of Mayflower Compact signing, 1920 issue

On November 23, 1920, at a commemoration ceremony for the 300th anniversary of the Mayflower landing, then Massachusetts governor Calvin Coolidge, who became the 30th U.S. president a few years later, said the following about the Mayflower Compact:

The compact which they signed was an event of the greatest importance. It was the foundation of liberty based on law and order, and that tradition has been steadily upheld. They drew up a form of government which has been designated as the first real constitution of modern times. It was democratic, an acknowledgment of liberty under law and order and the giving to each person the right to participate in the government, while they promised to be obedient to the laws.

But the really wonderful thing was that they had the power and strength of character to abide by it and live by it from that day to this. Some governments are better than others. But any form of government is better than anarchy, and any attempt to tear down government is an attempt to wreck civilization.

== See also ==
- Fundamental Orders of Connecticut (1638)
- Instrument of Government (1653)
- List of Mayflower passengers
- List of Mayflower passengers who died in the winter of 1620–1621
- Mayflower
- Mayflower Compact signatories
- Mayflower passengers who died at sea November/December 1620
