= William Halsall =

American painter (1841–1919)

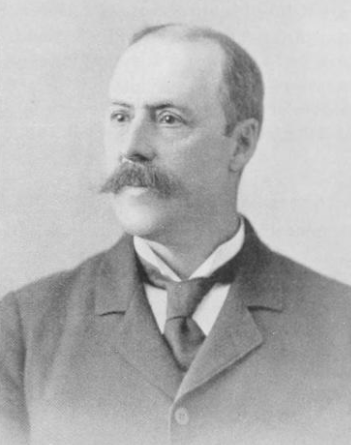
- Born: William Formby Halsall; March 20, 1841; Kirkdale, England
- Died: November 7, 1919 (aged 78); Winthrop, Massachusetts, U.S.
- Occupation: Painter

William Formby Halsall (March 20, 1841 – November 7, 1919) was a marine painter born in Kirkdale, England. His parents were John and Mary.

He lived at Provincetown, Massachusetts, and died as a US citizen.

== Mariner and fresco painter ==
Halsall was educated in Boston and worked as a sailor for seven years from 1852 to 1859. In 1860, he had begun to study fresco painting but due to the outbreak of the American Civil War, he enlisted in the United States Navy. He resumed his fresco study after two years of service.

== Marine painting ==
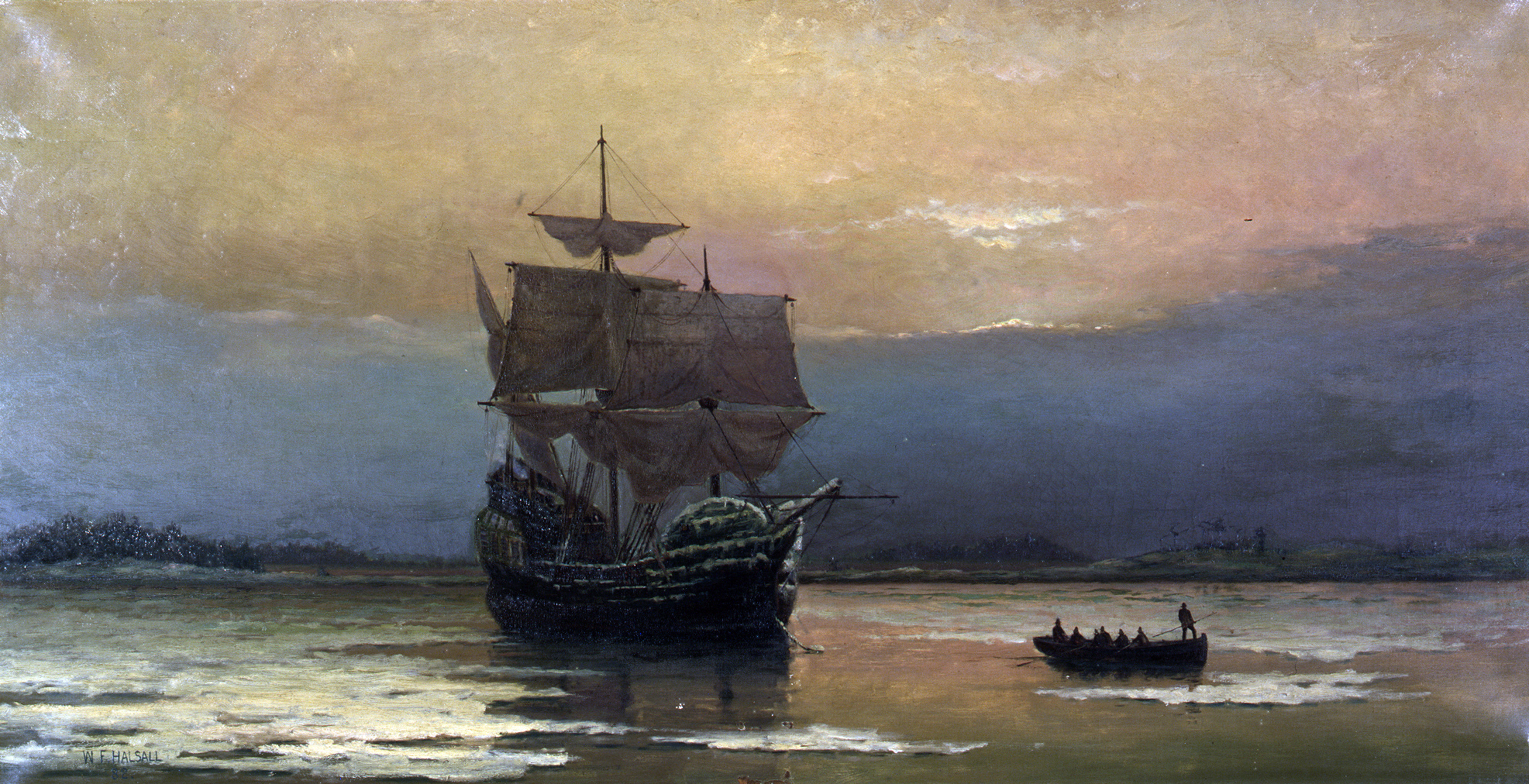
Mayflower in Plymouth Harbor, one of Halsall's famous paintings (1882)

In 1862, Halsall changed to marine painting and studied at the Lowell Institute in Boston until 1870. Halsall was also a founding member of the Provincetown Art Association in 1914.

He died in Winthrop, Massachusetts on November 7, 1919.
