= Peter Browne (Mayflower passenger) =

Mayflower passenger (1594–1633)

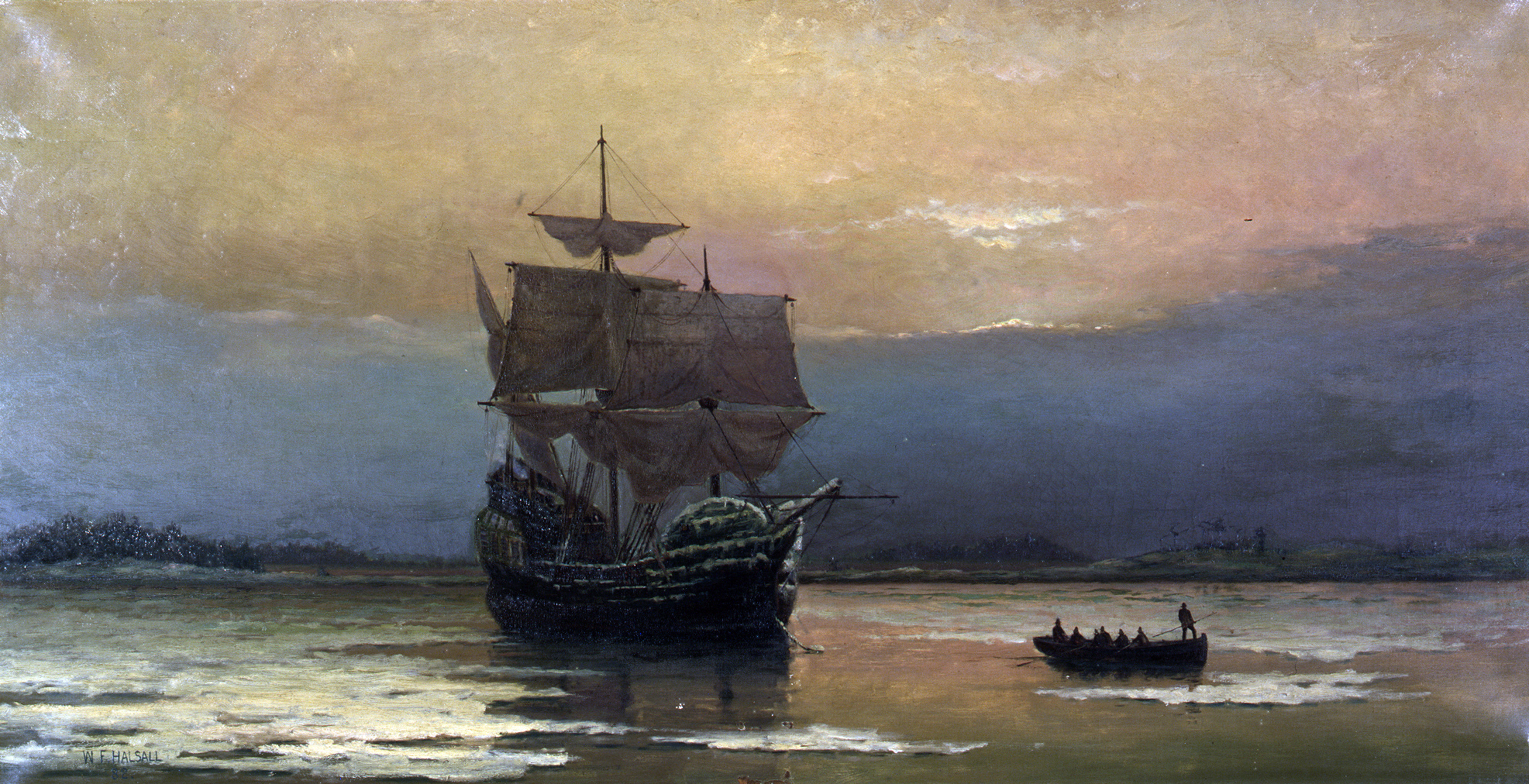
Mayflower in Plymouth Harbor by William Halsall (1882)

Peter Browne (c. 1594 – 1633), was a passenger on the historic 1620 voyage of the Mayflower and was a signatory of the Mayflower Compact.

== Life in England ==
Browne was baptised on 26 January 1594/5 in Dorking, Surrey, England. This was the same home town as other Mayflower passengers – the Mullins family.

Peter Browne was a son of William Browne of Dorking. He had two older siblings, Jane and Thomas, as well as three younger brothers, Samuel, John and James. In or about 1605, when Peter was about ten years of age, his father died and the children may have been sent to family members and friends under apprenticeships. A local weaver probably apprenticed the three youngest sons in that line of work.

Browne may have heard of the proposed Mayflower voyage from his relationship with the Mullins family. William Mullins was a shoe and boot maker in Dorking and was one of the Londoners who was later involved in the financial support of the Mayflower voyage. Peter's sister Jane had married John Hammon in Dorking in 1610 and her mother-in-law, Jane Hammon, had appointed William Mullins as her estate administrator. Also, John Hammon's sister Susan married Ephraim Bothell, who purchased William Mullins's property and home before Mullins and his family boarded the Mayflower.

== On the Mayflower ==
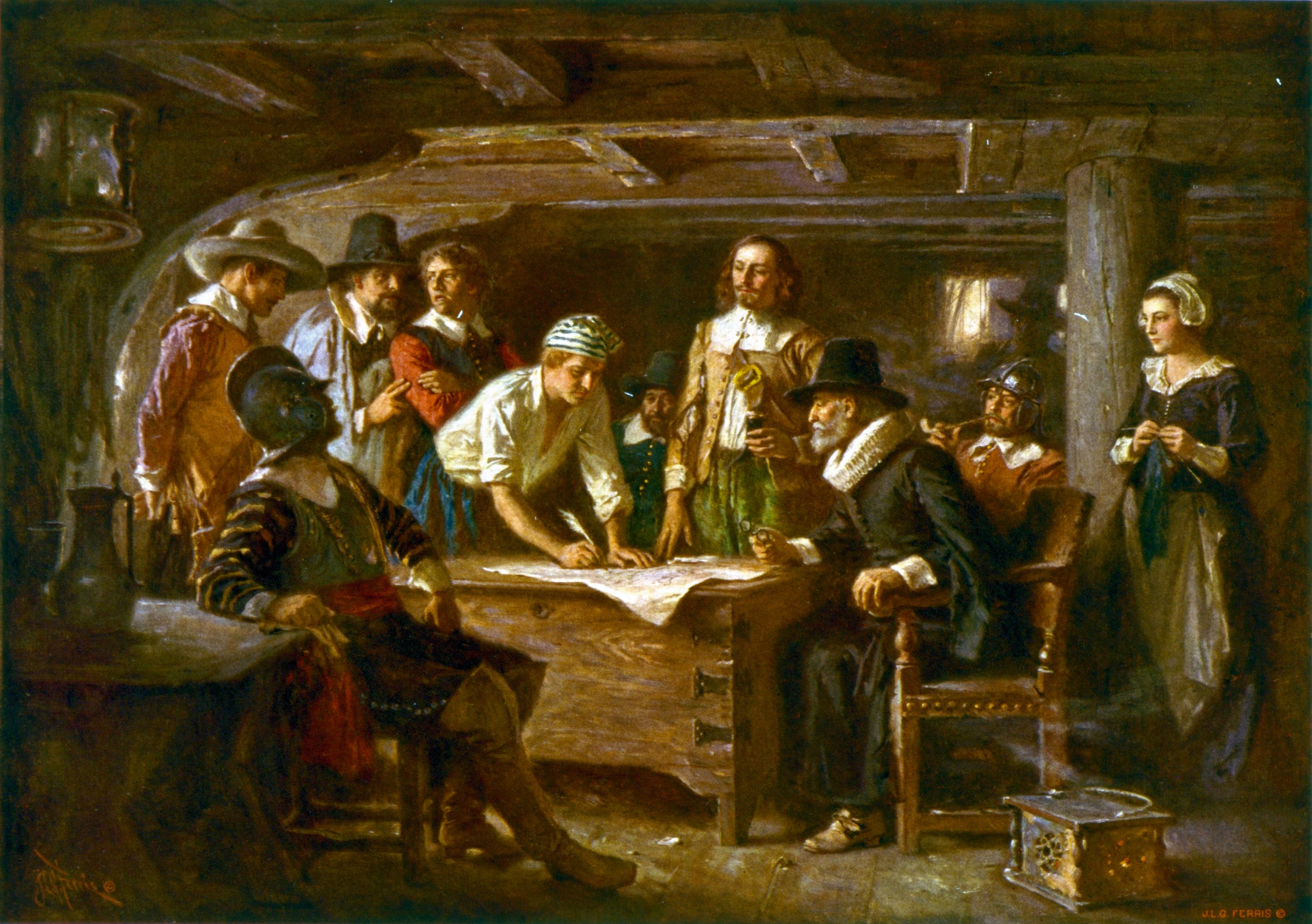
Signing the Mayflower Compact 1620, a painting by Jean Leon Gerome Ferris 1899

The relationship between Peter Browne and the Mullins family in Dorking did seem quite close. As a single man of about age twenty-five, and possibly coming from an apprenticeship, he boarded the Mayflower in the company of the Mullins family. But these ties were to be broken with the death of William Mullins, his wife Alice and son Joseph soon after arrival in the New World.

The Mayflower departed Plymouth, England on 6/16 September 1620. The small, 100-foot ship had 102 passengers and a crew of about 30–40 in extremely cramped conditions. By the second month out, the ship was being buffeted by strong westerly gales, causing the ship's timbers to be badly shaken with caulking failing to keep out sea water, and with passengers, even in their berths, lying wet and ill. This, combined with a lack of proper rations and unsanitary conditions for several months, attributed to what would be fatal for many, especially the majority of women and children. On the way there were two deaths, a crew member and a passenger, but the worst was yet to come after arriving at their destination when, in the space of several months, almost half the passengers perished in cold, harsh, unfamiliar New England winter.

On 9/19 November 1620, after about 3 months at sea, including a month of delays in England, they spotted land, which was Cape Cod. And after several days of trying to get south to their planned destination of the Colony of Virginia, strong winter seas forced them to return to the harbor at the Cape Cod hook, where they anchored on 11/11 November [11/21 November N.S. *]. Realizing they were not at the intended destination they determined to bind themselves as a democratically governed and administered colony loyal to England. This document became known as the Mayflower Compact and was signed by all eligible men on behalf of themselves, their families, their fortunes and property. Peter Browne was one of the men who signed the Mayflower Compact."

== In Plymouth Colony ==
On 12 January 1621, while the Pilgrims were building their settlement of Plymouth, Peter Browne, John Goodman and others had entered the forest some distance from the Pilgrim plantation in order to find material for roofing thatch. Sometime around noon, Browne and Goodman wandered further into the forest while the other men stayed behind to make up the thatch into bundles. After these men had done that work, they tried to locate Browne and Goodman in the forest, but they could not be found. These men went to the settlement and informed others that the men could not be located. This caused about 10-12 armed men to search for them, in fear they were captured by Indians. As it happened, Browne and Goodman were eating lunch when their dogs starting chasing a deer and they were soon lost. According to records, "they wandered all that afternoon being wet, and at night it did freeze and snow, they were slenderly appareled and had no weapons but each one sickle." At night they thought they heard "lions" in the forest and climbed a tree for shelter. They stayed by the tree that night in case they had to escape to safety. The next day they finally climbed the highest hill they could find, were able to see their harbor and find their way back to the settlement. After the searchers had given up hope of finding them, Browne and Goodman finally arrived in Plymouth quite cold, frostbitten, tired and hungry, having survived their first experience alone in the New England forest.

In the Plymouth settlement of 1620, the house of Peter Browne was near that of John Goodman and was close to the harbor on the south side of the village street. John Goodman is listed as having been alive at least on 19 January 1621 and is noted as having not survived that first winter, but his name does appear in records of the 1623 Division of Land and he may have died sometime after that.

In the 1623 Division of Land, as a single man, Peter Browne received one "aker" of land "these lye on the South side of the brooke to the baywards." In that record, his name appears as "Peter Browen."

Sometime after the Division of Land, Peter Browne married the widow Martha Ford, arriving in November 1621 on the ship Fortune as the only recorded woman on board. Her husband Mr. Ford apparently died on the voyage or just after arrival. Martha gave birth to a son the day of arrival but he died soon after. Per Banks, Mourt's Relations (p. 63) records this event: "the good wife Ford was delivered of a sonne the first night shee landed, and both of them are very well."

Widow Martha Ford received four lots (shares) in the 1623 Division of Land, to which she was entitled by this family count. In those records, she is listed as "Widow Foord."

In 1626 Peter Browne was one of twenty-seven Purchasers involved with the colony joint-stock company which afterwards was turned over to the control of senior colony members. That group was called Undertakers, and were made up of such as Bradford, Standish and Allerton initially who were later joined by Winslow, Brewster, Howland, Alden, Prence and others from London, former Merchant Adventurers. On the agreement, dated 26 October 1626, his name appears as Peter Browne.

By the time of the 1627 Division of the Cattle, Peter Browne and his wife Martha had a daughter Mary and was pregnant with another daughter, Priscilla. Also in the family were children from Martha (Ford) Browne's first marriage, John and Martha Ford. The two Ford children shared in the 1627 division of the cattle. The "eaight lot" of the Division under 'Samuell ffuller", consisted of the "Peeter Browne" family listed as "Peeter Browne, Martha Browne, Mary Browne, John fford, Martha fford."

His wife Martha died about 1630, and Peter Browne remarried to a woman named Mary whose surname and ancestry have not been discovered. With the second wife, Peter Browne had two more children, Rebecca, about 1631, and another child about 1633, name and gender unknown, who may have died as a youth.

On 1 January 1633, Browne was fined three shillings by Plymouth Colony Court for failing to appear at the court session and on 2 January was fined by the court in the same amount for the same reason. When he did appear in court on 7 January, he was sued by fellow Mayflower passenger Dr. Samuel Fuller for "divers accounts…wherein they differ." They were sent to arbitration, the outcome of which is not known. Also in 1633, he appeared on the Tax List for that year as "Peter Browne."

== Marriages and Children ==
Peter Browne married twice, first to Martha, the widow of Mr. Ford, both passengers in 1621 on the ship Fortune with the husband dying before arrival. She was married to Peter Browne in 1626 and had two daughters before her death in 1630. His second wife was Mary (maiden name and parentage unknown), married about 1630 or 1631 and had two children.

Children of Peter and Martha Browne:

- Mary Browne was born about 1626 and died after November 1689. She married Ephraim Tinkham in Plymouth by 27 October 1647 and had nine children. A deed dated 27 October 1647 notes that Ephraim Tinkham and wife Mary sold to Henry Sampson land in Duxbury which was one-third of the land belonging to Peter Brown, deceased.
- Priscilla Browne was born about 1628 and died after 17 February 1697/8. She married William Allen in Sandwich on 21 March 1649. Priscilla and William did not have children. On 8 June 1650 William Allen of Sandwich and wife Priscilla sold to John Brown of Duxbury, weaver, land in Duxbury which was one part of three belonging to the children of Peter Brown, brother of John Brown. On 15 April 1668 William Allen sold to Henry Tucker a one-third share of land in Dartmouth which was granted to Peter Brown as a Purchaser of 1626.

Children of Peter and Mary (unknown) Browne:

- Rebecca Browne was born about 1631 and died after 9 March 1698/9. She married William Snow by about 1654.
- A child born by 1633, who died by 1647.

In addition, Peter was step-father of the children of Martha Ford: John Ford, born about 1617, whose name appears in a record of 5 January 1640/1 and after that no further reference can be found; Martha Ford, born about 1619, married William Nelson in Plymouth on 29 October 1640 and had four children before dying in Plymouth on 20 December 1683; and a son born on 9 November 1621 upon the arrival of the Fortune in Plymouth, but who died soon after.

== Peter Browne, death, estate and burial ==
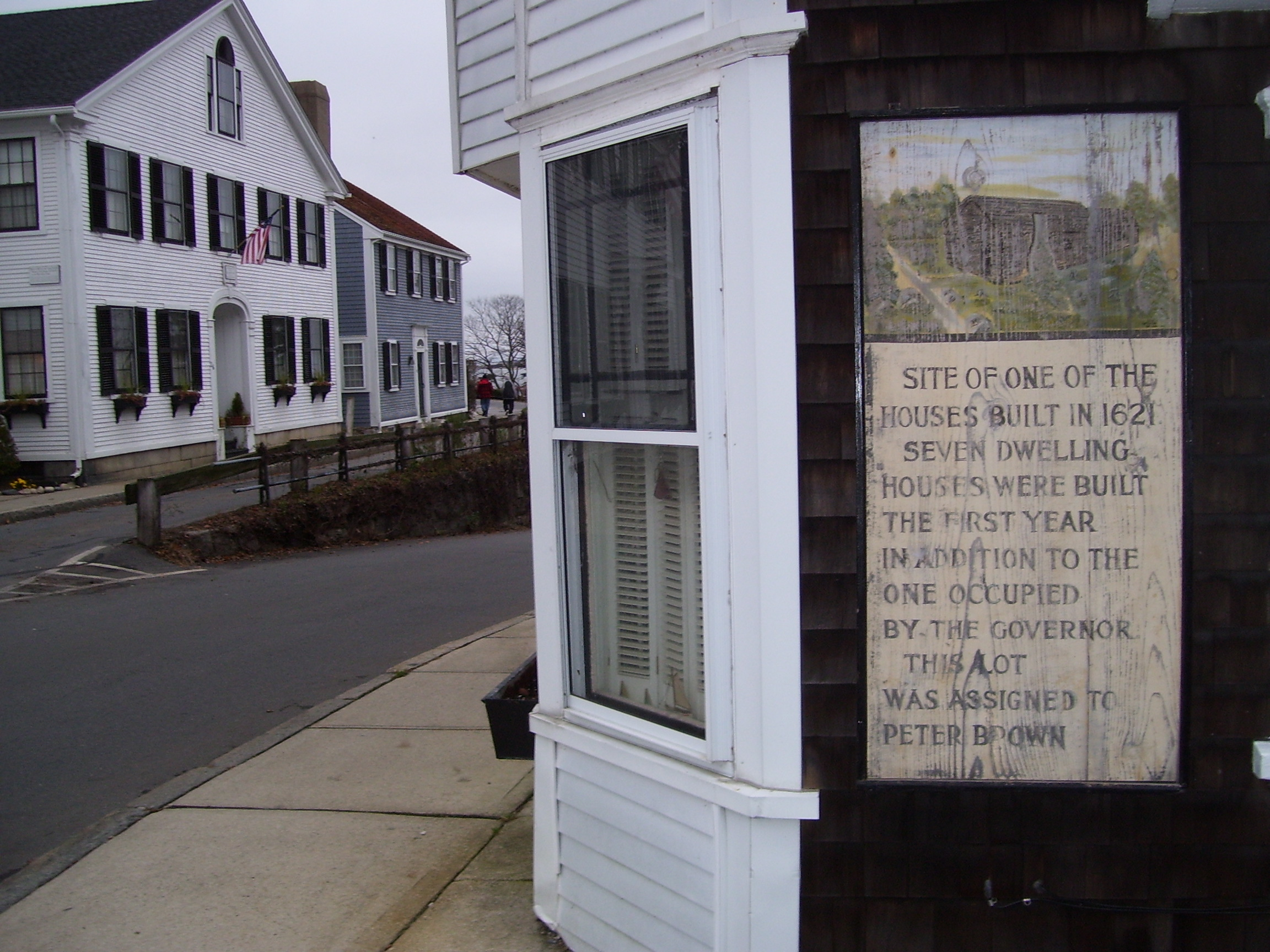
Peter Browne's home site on Leyden Street in Plymouth, Massachusetts

Peter Brown had health issues which became serious in late 1632. He died later in 1633, possibly in early fall from a probable infectious disease. The inventory of his assets was taken on 10 October 1633. He had apparently been attended to by Dr. Samuel Fuller and his inventory shows a debt by Browne's widow of Dr. Samuel Fuller for one peck of malt and some purgative, and a debt for "letting her man bleed." His estate also owed Kenelm, brother of Mayflower passenger Edward Winslow, twelve shillings for building his coffin. Browne's estate inventory detailed such as grain, animals, a firearm, tools, household goods, clothing, etc.. Ironically, his attending doctor Samuel Fuller also died from the same disease at that time, as did fellow Mayflower passenger Francis Eaton and others.

Following Browne's death, his widow Mary was made administrator of his estate on 11 November 1633. She was ordered by the court to pay 15 pounds to John Doane to assume custody of Browne's daughter Mary and the same amount to William Gilson for the custody of Browne's daughter Priscilla with the court placing Mary with Doane for nine years and Priscilla with Gilson for twelve years until both were age seventeen. Mary retained custody of her two children by her first husband and was allowed the rest of Browne's estate for her own third for raising her own two children.

At age seventeen, Mary and Priscilla Browne asked the Plymouth Court to assign their custody over to their uncle, John Browne, a weaver then residing in Duxbury. Browne was a brother of their father Peter Browne.

Peter Browne died shortly before 10 October 1633, when the after-death inventory of his property was taken. His death was not recorded in the records of Plymouth County. He and his first wife Martha were both buried at Burial Hill in Plymouth.
