= The Fall of New Amsterdam =

1932 painting by Jean Leon Gerome Ferris

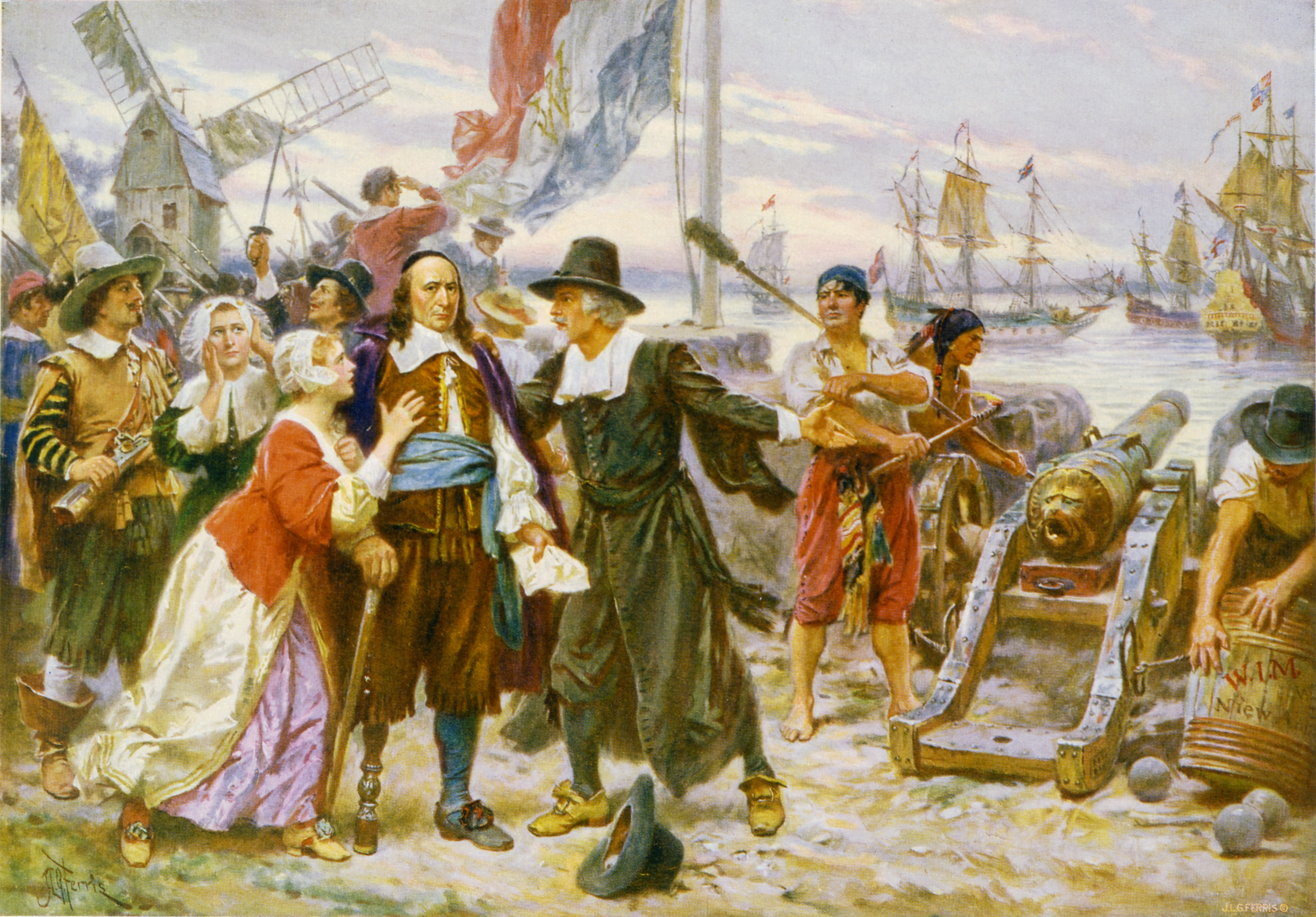
- The Fall of New Amsterdam, showing Peter Stuyvesant (left, with wooden leg) among New Amsterdam residents pleading with him not to open fire on warships waiting to claim the territory for England.
- Artist: Jean Leon Gerome Ferris
- Year: 1932
- Type: Oil

The Fall of New Amsterdam is a historical painting by the American artist Jean Leon Gerome Ferris.
