= John Goodman (pilgrim) =

Mayflower passenger

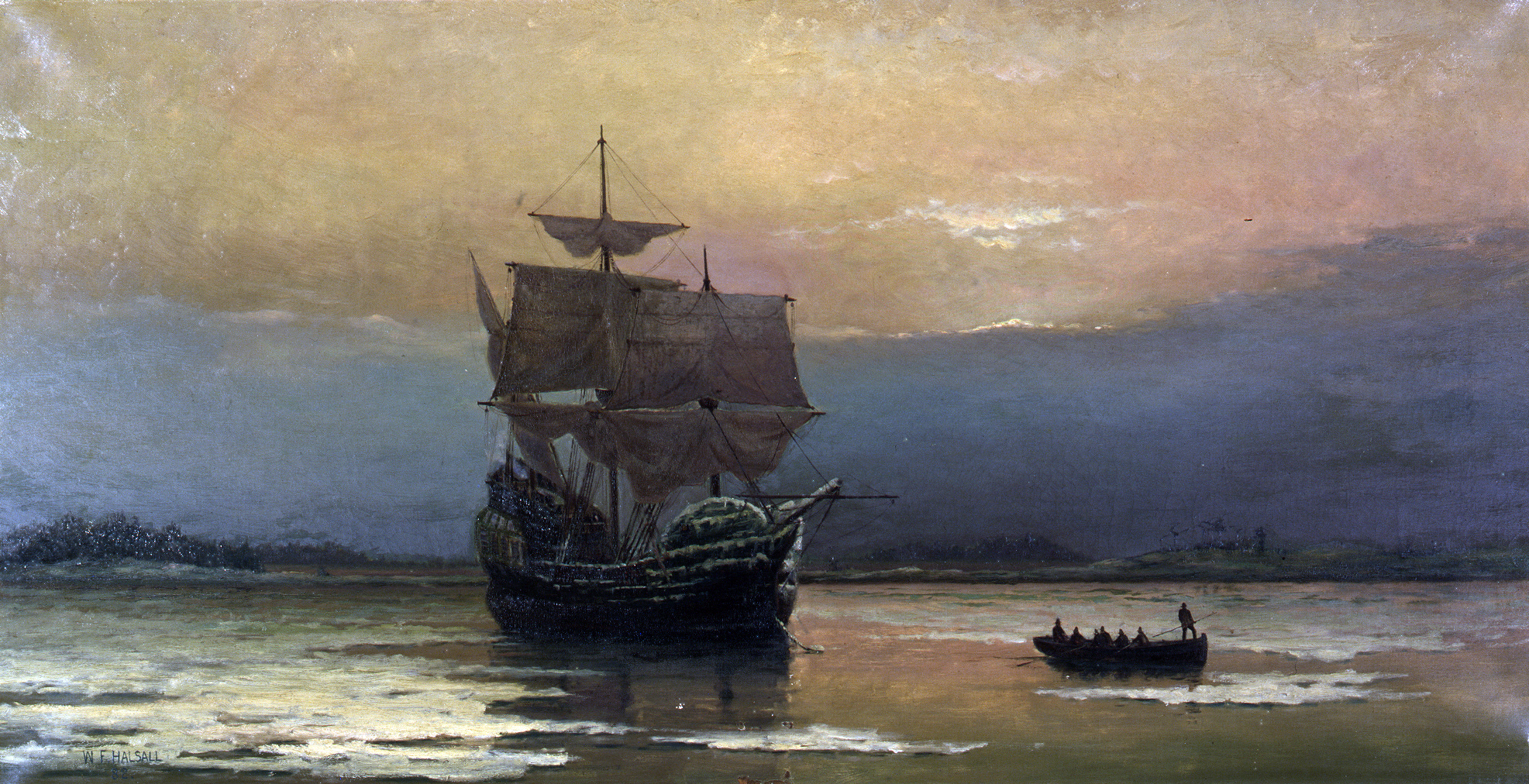
Mayflower in Plymouth Harbor by William Halsall (1882)

John Goodman (c. 1595 to 1623-1627) was a Pilgrim who traveled aboard the Mayflower in 1620 to Plymouth, Massachusetts.

== Early life ==
Virtually nothing is known about the details of John Goodman's life before the Pilgrims' voyage to New England. It is believed that Goodman was originally a passenger of the Speedwell, a smaller companion ship of the Mayflower. However, a number of irreparable leaks forced passengers of the Speedwell to be moved aboard the Mayflower. At the time of the Mayflower's journey, he is listed as a linen weaver and being 25 years of age. There are conflicting records of whether he was married or not; no wife is recorded as having come over to Plymouth to join him, possibly having decided to stay behind in Leiden.

== Life in the New World ==
On January 12, 1621, Goodman, along with another settler, Peter Browne, became lost in the woods after working to gather thatch for the construction of homes in the settlement. A search party was dispatched by Governor John Carver in the hopes that the two men would be found before they might inadvertently cross paths with natives living in the area. At some point, while still lost, Goodman and Brown believed they had heard "two lions roaring exceedingly for a long time together, and a third, that they thought was very near them." This led the two men to attempt to take shelter in a tree. However, after finding the task too implausible, they remained awake all night, pacing around the base of the tree. The "lions" they heard, more likely to be wolves or coyotes, never came. The following day, the two men were able to find their way back to the settlement, but not before Goodman's feet were temporarily crippled from frostbite due to the snowing and freezing conditions.

On January 19, while Goodman was recovering from his injuries, two wolves were reported to have run after "a little spaniel" that was with him. The dog allegedly took comfort between Goodman's legs while he picked up a stick and threw it, managing to hit one of the wolves and drive them off. However, they soon returned. Goodman picked up a fence-post, ready to utilize it while the wolves sat nearby, "grinning at him a good while" before finally departing on their own. This is thought to be one of the earliest recorded wolf attacks in North America.

== Death ==
The exact cause and date of his death are unknown. During the winter of 1620-1621, roughly half of everybody in the party died, overwhelmingly from sickness rather than cold or starvation. It is unknown if Goodman was among those people, and if so, of what he died. Governor William Bradford later recalled him as having been among those who died during that first winter, despite the fact that John Goodman's name appears in the 1623 Division of Land agreement in the colony. While less likely, it is theoretically possible that Goodman had a son whose name would have appeared on the agreement in place of his father's, although there is no record of a son joining him on the voyage over. Nevertheless, John Goodman's name does not appear at all in the 1627 Division of Land agreement, thus indicating that he likely died sometime between 1623 and 1627.
