= William Latham (pilgrim) =

- Born: 4 February 1608; Chorley, Lancashire, Kingdom of England
- Died: 6 March 1651 (aged 43); Eleuthera, British Bahamas
- Cause of death: Starvation
- Occupations: Servant, settler, farmer
- Known for: Mayflower passenger
- Spouse(s): Elizabeth Newman; Mary Latham
- Children: at least 1

William Latham (1608–1651) was a Mayflower passenger who traveled to North America as a young man servant and later became a settler in Plymouth Colony. He is known mostly for his survival of the first winter and his participation in early colonial life, though he later perished in an ill-fated colony attempt in the Bahamas, led by William Sayle.

== Early life & Family ==
William Latham was born in 1608 to William 'Hugh' Latham and Eline Saunders. Not much is known about his early life other than he became a man servant to John Carver at age 11. He had two known wives, Elizabeth, and Mary. William Latham had at least one son, Robert Latham, who was born in England.

== Voyage on the Mayflower ==
In 1620, Latham traveled on the Mayflower as an 11-year-old man servant to John Carver, a Pilgrim leader that helped found Plymouth Colony. He is listed on the passenger manifest as part of Carver's household.

== Life in Plymouth Colony ==
After the death of John Carver in April 1621, Latham completed his service under William Bradford. He appears in early Plymouth records, including the 1627 Division of Cattle, indicating his continued residence there and his participation in the colony. During the 1630s, Latham was taxed at the lowest rate available, held some land, and engaged in local economic activities such as property transactions and farming. Latham apparently returned to England after his house burned down, and then shortly thereafter made a trip to the Bahamas.

== Later years and death ==
Around 1645, Latham left Plymouth Colony and joined an expedition during the English Civil War to settle on Eleuthera, in the Bahamas. The settlement failed, and Latham is believed to have died in 1651, likely from starvation after the loss of supplies.
