= William Mullins (Mayflower passenger) =

Mayflower passenger

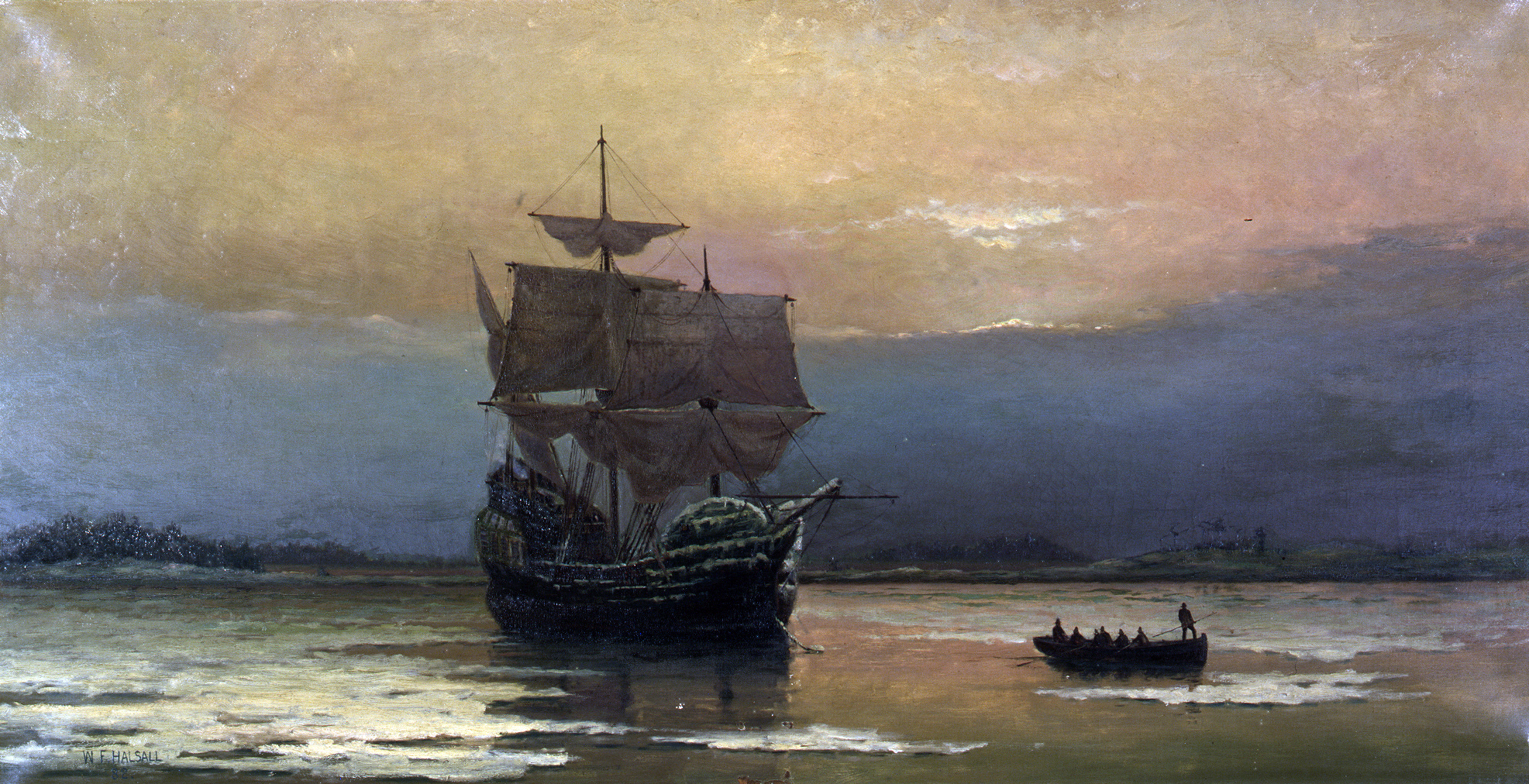
Mayflower in Plymouth Harbor by William Halsall (1882)

William Mullins (c. 1572 – 21 February 1621) and his family traveled as passengers on the historic 1620 voyage to America on the Pilgrim ship Mayflower. He was a signatory to the Mayflower Compact. Mullins perished in the pilgrims' first winter in the New World, with his wife and son dying soon after.

== Early life in England ==
William Mullins was born about 1572 in Dorking, co. Surrey, England (about 21 miles south of London), most likely the son of John and Joan/Joane (Bridger) Mullins of that parish. John Mullins died in February 1584 and William's mother Joane married secondly Vincent Benham on 1 November 1585. Most unfortunately, the parish registers of Dorking were not maintained by the vicar between 1572 and 1578, so his baptism went unrecorded.

William Mullins is first named in a Dorking record on 4 October 1595, when he was fined two pence, apparently for not attending the manorial court session of that year. He was recorded in that record as living in the Chippingborough neighborhood of Dorking. William Mullins then disappears from Dorking records until 1604. Mullins may have moved from Dorking to Stoke near Guildford, co. Surrey (a parish about ten miles to the west), where a man of that name appears on the militia list of 1596. He married sometime around this date, but (most unfortunately again) the parish registers of Stoke near Guildford have been lost for the period prior to 1662, so his marriage record, and the baptisms of his children, are not to be found.

William reappears in Dorking on 5 October 1604, when he was elected tithingman for the Eastborough neighbourhood. The tithingman was the head of a "frankpledge" – a group of about ten families that were collectively bonded to the king for their good behaviour. When a member of the frankpledge was fined or punished, the entire frankpledge was held responsible, which is apparently what happened on 19 September 1605 when William Mullins was summoned and his frankpledge fined for an unspecified transgression.

Dorking records exist for several dates in 1612 for William Mullins:

On 30 March 1612 – William Mullins witnessed the will of John Wood. He signed the will with a mark, an "X", indicating that he had not learned to write.

On 20 December 1612 – William Mullins, shoemaker, was named in Jane Hammon's will, where she appointed him one of the overseers of her estate.

On 28 December 1612 – William Mullins bought a holding from John Jettor in Dorking with a house and an acre and a half of land and outbuildings between West Street and Back Lane (now Church Street) for 122 pounds and assumed a mortgage of 200 pounds. This house still exists and is often a stopping place for tourists. Banks refers to this house as the "Manor of Dorking."

In August (Banks says 29 April) 1616, a warrant was issued to bring "one William Mollins before their Lordships." On 1 May he appeared before the Lordships of the Privy Council and was continued technically in their custody "untill by their Honours' order hee be dismissed." While the reason for his arrest is not given, it was most probably associated with the religious controversies of that time.

In May 1619, William Mullins sold his Dorking Manor holdings to Ephraim Bothell/Bothall for 280 pounds, apparently in preparation for his voyage on the Mayflower. It appears he made a good living as a shoemaker as his was one of the larger investments in the Merchant Adventurers group which was investing in the Pilgrim venture. His will shows he had nine shares of stock in the Merchant Adventurers and that his estate consisted primarily of boots and shoes.

The London businessmen known as the Merchant Adventurers, under the direction of Thomas Weston, invested in the Mayflower voyage from the very beginning. The documents drawn up, and approved by members of the Leiden church, imposed certain restrictions on the Pilgrims work week, to which they agreed. But as the time to depart England drew near, the Adventurers wanted the restrictions tightened which would have caused the Pilgrims to work almost 7 days a week, in effect to increase profits, without such as due time for religious activities. In a letter written by many of the Pilgrims to the Adventurers, they mentioned that many of the passengers had already invested in the company based on the previous terms, and therefore it was unfair to change them. They pointed out that Robert Cushman had delivered William Mullins a copy of the terms, upon which Mullins paid in. Although Robert Cushman, who had been the Leiden agent for Mayflower voyage preparations, came to Plymouth in November 1621 to try to settle the differences between the Pilgrims and the Adventurers, they parted ways without coming to an agreement on the terms by which they would work—the beginning of a rift that would pull apart the company in later years when the Pilgrims bought out the Adventurers and formed their own investment company.

== On the Mayflower ==
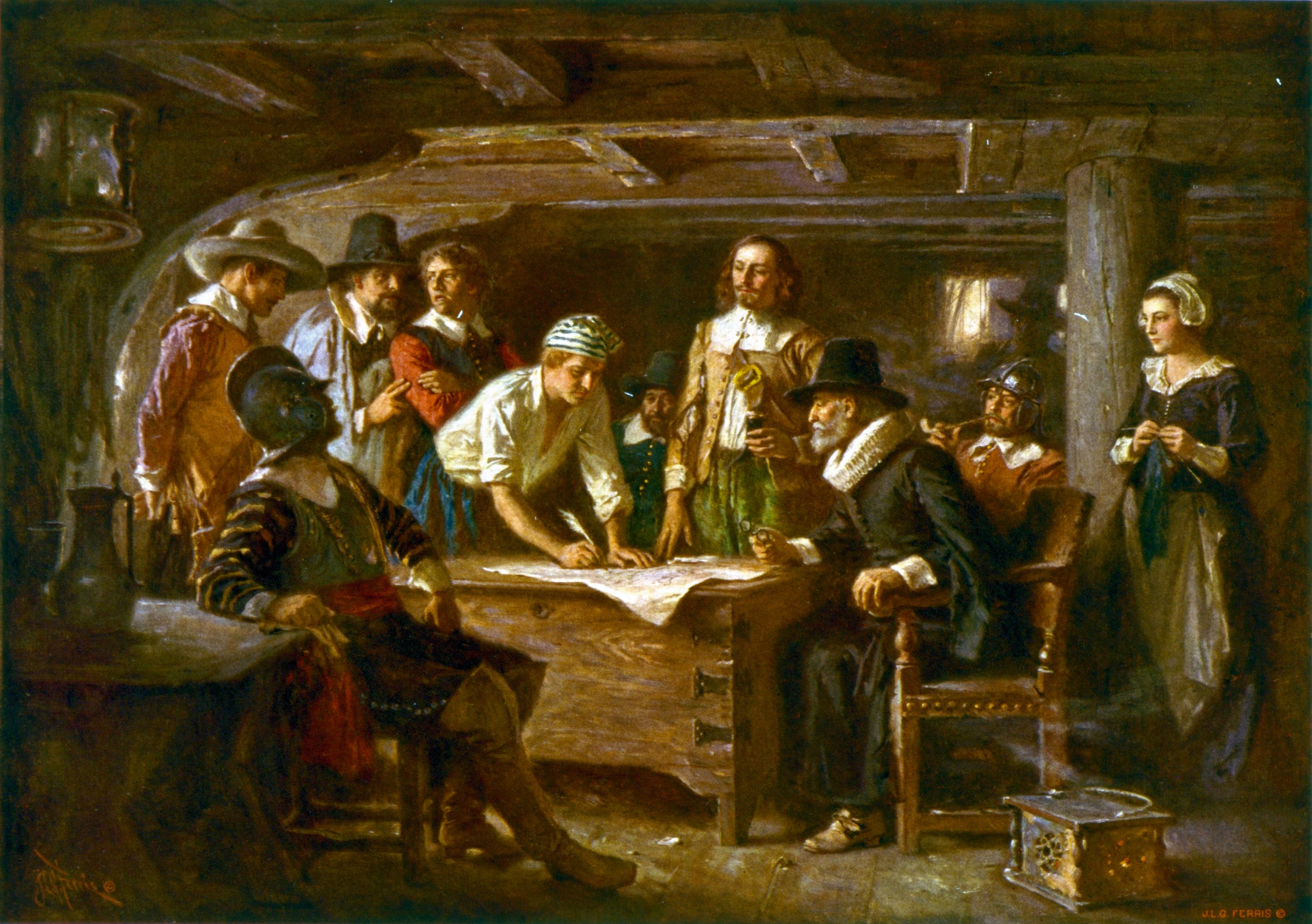
Signing the Mayflower Compact 1620, a painting by Jean Leon Gerome Ferris 1899

When the Mullins family boarded the Mayflower, it consisted of William, then nearing 50 years of age, his wife Alice, daughter Priscilla (probably about 17 years old) and son Joseph (probably about 15 years old), as well as a servant, Robert Carter. They boarded the ship with the London contingent, and not as a part of the Leiden religionists. Mullins was a shoemaker and businessman, and carried with him a large stock of boots and shoes. The family had left behind in Dorking the two eldest children: Sarah, about age 22 and probably married; and William, possibly in his late 20s and married. His daughter Sarah, married to a man named Blunden, was his estate administrator, as requested in Mullins' will.

Recording those on board the Mayflower, William Bradford wrote of Mullins as "Mr. William Mullins", possibly as he was somewhat more prosperous than many of the original settlers: "Mr. William Mullines, and his wife, and *2* children, Joseph and Priscila; and a servant, Robart Carter."

The Mayflower departed Plymouth, England on 16 September 1620. The small, 100-foot ship had 102 passengers and a crew of about 30–40 in extremely cramped conditions. By the second month out, the ship was being buffeted by strong westerly gales, causing the ship's timbers to be badly shaken with caulking failing to keep out sea water, and with passengers, even in their berths, lying wet and ill. This, combined with a lack of proper rations and unsanitary conditions for several months, attributed to what would be fatal for many, especially the majority of women and children. On the way, there were two deaths, a crew member and a passenger, but the worst was yet to come after arriving at their destination when, in the space of several months, almost half the passengers perished in a cold, harsh, and unfamiliar New England winter.

On 19 November 1620, after about three months at sea, including a month of delays in England, they spotted the Cape Cod hook, now called Provincetown Harbor. After several days of trying to get south to their planned destination of the Colony of Virginia, strong winter seas forced them to return to the harbor at Cape Cod hook, where they anchored on 21 November 1620, and William Mullins, with 40 other male passengers, signed The Mayflower Compact.

== In the New World ==
William Mullins, his wife Alice and son Joseph all died within months of arriving in the New World, along with their servant Robert Carter. Only their daughter Priscilla survived. William himself was apparently the first to die, on 21 February 1621. He made out a nuncupative will on his deathbed, in which he mentioned "my man Robert" indicating Carter was still alive then. Per Stratton, Alice, her son Joseph and servant Robert Carter were all alive on 5 April 1621 when the Mayflower set sail on its return voyage to England, but all had died before the arrival of the ship Fortune in mid-November of that year.

== Family ==
In the March 2012 Mayflower Quarterly, noted Mayflower researcher and biographer, Caleb Johnson, presented a hypothesis that William Mullins first married Elizabeth Wood who gave birth to his first four children, and died sometime prior to 1604; whereupon, he married Alice_____ who gave birth to his youngest child, Joseph. In that article, he stated, “I here put together this very speculative hypothesis, and leave it up to future research to determine if there is any further evidence to support, or disprove, this possibility. It should be emphasized that this is a speculative hypothesis based on limited concrete data....” Unfortunately, some have interpreted his hypothesis as factual rather than speculative. It has been nearly ten years since Mr. Johnson wrote that article in the Mayflower Quarterly and in his own words “no additional evidence, supporting or disproving that hypothesis, has been published since that time.”

In October 2021, Mr. Johnson added a second paragraph to the profile of Alice Mullins in his website, Mayflowerhistory.com. The profile of Alice Mullins, as it is currently written follows in its entirety:

“Little is known about Alice, the wife of William Mullins. She is named only once: in the 1621 will of her husband William Mullins. It is not known if she is the mother of all his children, some of his children, or none of them. There is no evidence she had the Atwood or Poretiers surnames claimed by some 19th and early 20th century authors.

“Recent research into her origins, undertaken by Caleb Johnson and Simon Neal, has focused on the Browne, Dendy, Gardinar, Hammon, and Wood families of Dorking and Holy Trinity, Guildford. In 2012 (Mayflower Quarterly, 78:44-57),

Caleb Johnson published a speculative hypothesis that William Mullins may have married twice, first Elizabeth Wood, and second Alice, perhaps widow of either William or Thomas Browne (possibly making Alice the mother or aunt of Mayflower passenger Peter Browne). While the speculative hypothesis matches all the known facts, it is by no means proven. No additional evidence, supporting or disproving that hypothesis, has been published since that time.”

Accordingly, this section has been revised to remove Elizabeth Wood as his first wife and conform the family to the presentation in Volume 16, Part I of Mayflower Families through Five Generations, commonly referred to as the Silver Books.

As previously stated above, on 29 April 1616, William Mullins was called before the Lordships of the Privy Council and held for an unknown reason for a period of time. “While the reason for his arrest is not given, it was most probably associated with the religious controversies of that time. The fact that he was a Dissenter may explain why William Mullins’ marriage record is not found in the Parish Register for Dorking, nor are the baptisms of his children.”

William Mullins was the first of three children born to John Mullins and Joane Bridger, who married 8 July 1571. Their children:

- William, born about 1572; married Alice _____; died 21 February 1621 in Plymouth, New England.
- John, born 1577; married first, _____ _____; second, 1 May 1637, Sara Rining, died 1639; third, 23 September 1639, Joane Gammon. John Mullins had no children by any of his three wives.
- Edward, baptized 23 September 1582.

“Because we have no marriage date for William and Alice and no baptismal dates for the children, we cannot prove that Alice was the mother of his children, but in the absence of other evidence, we are assuming that she was the mother of all the children.”

Children of William and [probably] Alice _____ Mullins:

- William, born probably at Dorking, co. Surrey, England; died at Braintree, Massachusetts, probably at the house of his daughter Sarah, 12 February 1672. He married in England, by 1618 (baptism of child), _____ _____, who died 1622 or after (baptism of child). He may have married second, as William Mullings, at Boston, Massachusetts, 7 May 1656, Ann _____ Bell, widow of Thomas Bell of Boston. He had three children with _____ _____. All baptized at Dorking, co. Surrey, England:
1. Elizabeth, baptized 26 March 1618.
2. Ruth, baptized 31 October 1619.
3. Sara/Sarah, baptized 5 May 1622; died at Braintree, Massachusetts, between 13 August 1694 and 25 November 1697 (will and probate). She married first, Thomas Gannett; second, at Braintree, August 1655, William Savill, who died at Braintree, 6 April 1669; third, at Braintree, 5 September 1670, Thomas Faxon, who died at Braintree, 23 November 1680. In her will, dated 13 August 1694 and proved 25 November 1697, Sarah made bequests to her cousin Ruth Webb, wife of Peter Webb of Braintree; daughter-in-law Lydia Savill, wife of Benjamin Savill of Braintree, and her daughter Sarah Savill, and then directed that the remainder be divided among “my nearest relations.” From this it is presumed that Sarah had no other surviving children.
- Sara, married _____ Blunden, named in father's 1621 will.
- Priscilla, a Mayflower passenger, born say 1600–1605, at Dorking, co. Surrey, England. No birth or baptismal record exists and no recorded age has been found for Priscilla. She married John Alden, the cooper of the Mayflower, at Plymouth, Massachusetts, in 1623. Children of John and Priscila (Mullins) Alden, order uncertain, no birth nor baptismal records survive, the earliest born at Plymouth, others at Duxbury; all born before Bradford's 1650 list (proof for children from probate and land records):
1. Elizabeth, born about 1624–1625; married William Pabodie.
2. John, born about 1626, married Elizabeth (Phillips) Everill.
3. Joseph, born after 22 May 1627, probably about 1627; married Mary Simmons.
4. Sarah, born say between 1630 and 1640; married Alexander Standish.
5. Jonathan, born about 1633; married Abigail Hallett.
6. Ruth, born say about 1637; married John Bass.
7. Rebecca, born before 1649; married Thomas Delano.
8. Mary, died after 13 June 1688; unmarried.
9. Priscilla, died after 13 June 1688; unmarried.
10. David, born say about 1649–1650; married Mary Southworth.
- Joseph, a Mayflower passenger, died at Plymouth, Massachusetts, after 2 April 1621 (when his father's will was copied.)

== Will of William Mullins ==
The will of William Mullins was the first one written in New England. It was written for him on his deathbed by Governor John Carver and witnessed by Dr. Giles Heale, surgeon of the Mayflower and its captain, Christopher Jones. His is the only known will of a Mayflower passenger who died that winter, with it being taken back to England on the Mayflower's return trip. His will states that he was owed monies by "Goodman Wood" in the amount of 40 pounds of which he made distribution to family members in his will. Except for 10 pounds he gave to his daughter Sarah, he bequeathed all his stocks and bonds to his son William. He also made distribution of all goods and supplies brought with him on the Mayflower to family members as well as twenty-one dozen pairs of shoes and thirteen pairs of boots which he requested be sold to the New Plymouth Company. He also divided his shares in the joint-stock company among family members as well as stipulating that if his son William should ever come to Plymouth – which he eventually did – he would inherit his property there. The probate record of his will has the Latin annotation "nuper de Dorking defunctus in partibus transmarinis" indicating he formerly resided in Dorking, co. Surrey. The original will still survives today.

== Death and burial of William Mullins, his wife Alice and son Joseph ==
William Mullins died on 21 February 1621, coincidentally the same date as another Mayflower passenger, William White, whose wife Susannah did survive.

William Mullins' wife Alice and son Joseph are believed to have died sometime after the departure of the Mayflower for England on 5 April 1621 and before the arrival of the ship Fortune in mid-November 1621. William was buried in Cole's Hill Burial Ground, Plymouth, probably in an unmarked grave as was common in those early days. His wife Alice and son Joseph died sometime later in 1621 and were also buried in Cole's Hill Burial Ground. The family is memorialized on the Pilgrim Memorial Tomb, Cole's Hill, as "William Mullins, Alice his wife and Joseph their son."

== Apprentice in the company of the William Mullins family on the Mayflower ==
Robert Carter was an apprentice or manservant of William Mullins. He did not sign the Mayflower Compact in November 1620 and is believed to have been under age twenty-one at the time, probably in his late teens. Since he was traveling in the company of the Mullins family of Dorking, co. Surrey, it can be speculated that Carter came from this area as well, although his ancestry is uncertain.

When William Mullins died in February 1621, his will instructed his overseers "to have a special eye to my man Robert which hath not so much proved himself as I would he should have done." But Robert Carter died soon after his master's death.
