= Francis Eaton (Mayflower passenger) =

Mayflower passenger and New World colonist (1596–1633)

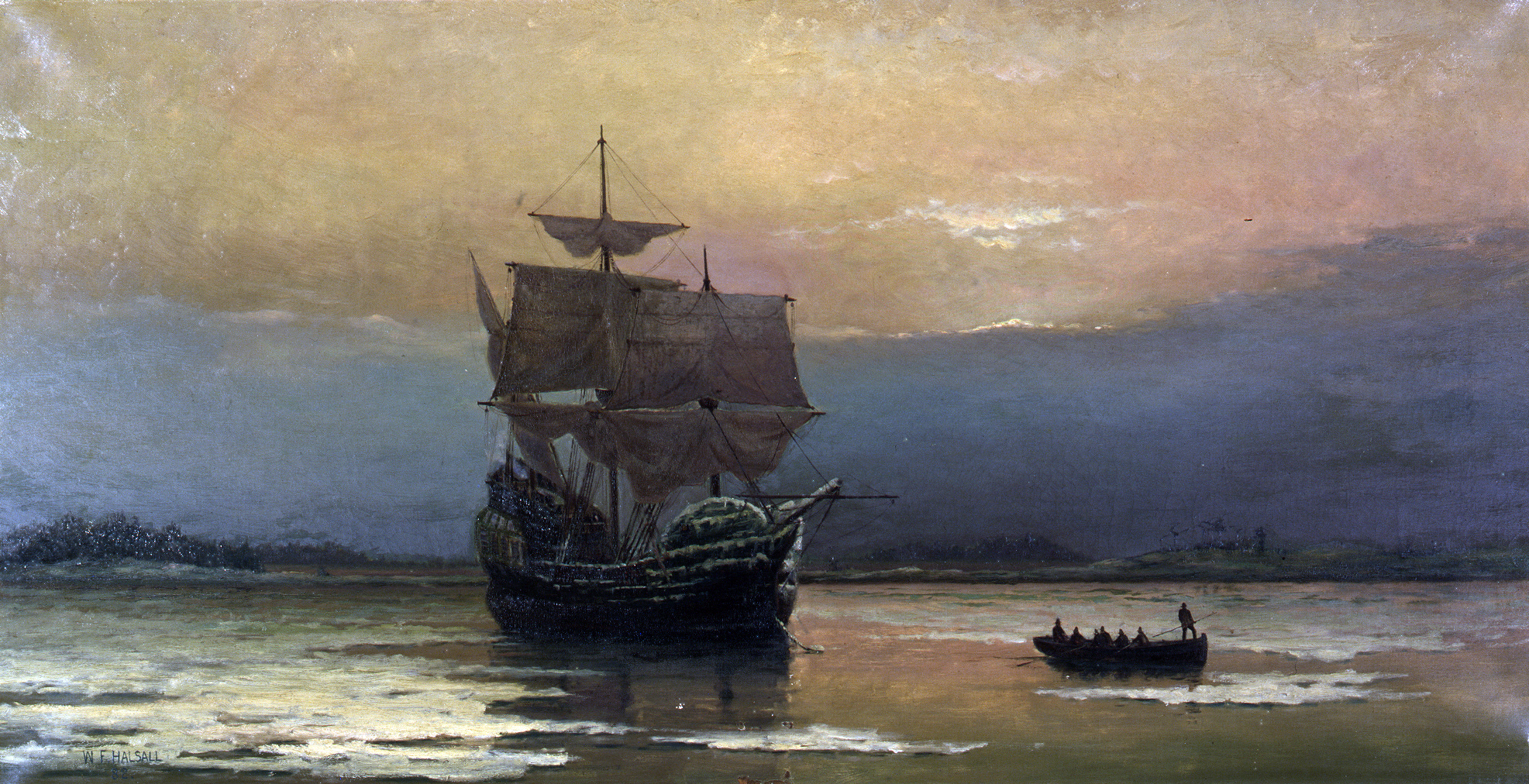
Mayflower in Plymouth Harbor by William Halsall (1882)

Francis Eaton was born c. 1596 in Bristol, England, and died in the autumn of 1633 in Plymouth, Massachusetts Bay Colony. He, with his wife and son, were passengers on the 1620 voyage of the Mayflower. His signature appears on the Mayflower Compact.

== Early life in England ==
Francis Eaton was baptised on 11 September 1596 at St. Thomas' Church in Bristol, England.

Francis was a son of John Eaton and his wife Dorothy (Smith). He had younger siblings who were born after him – including Jane in 1598 or 99, Samuel in 1600 and Welthian in 1602, but all siblings died of a possible devastating illness in March 1603 which may have spread through the whole family. He was the only child of this family known to survive until adulthood.

Eaton had become a house carpenter in Bristol by about age nineteen (c. 1615) and was living in a tenement in the parish of St. Phillips, Bristol. Bristol records after 1615 do not list Francis Eaton, who may have left England for Holland, as Bradford lists him on the Mayflower passenger list section for Leiden congregation members.

Probably about 1618 or 1619 in England, Francis Eaton married a woman named Sarah (surname unknown). There is no record in Bristol of his first marriage or of the birth of his son Samuel there, indicating the family may have lived elsewhere in England prior to boarding the Mayflower.

== Mayflower ==
Francis Eaton, his wife Sarah, with newborn son Samuel came on the Mayflower with William Bradford writing that Samuel "came over a sucking child."

Bradford noted this family at that time: "Francis Eaton, and Sarah, his wife, and Samuell, their son, a young child."

Francis Eaton was a carpenter by trade and Banks believes that he was the Mayflower ship's carpenter, being in the employ of the Merchant Adventurers, financial supporters of the Mayflower venture.

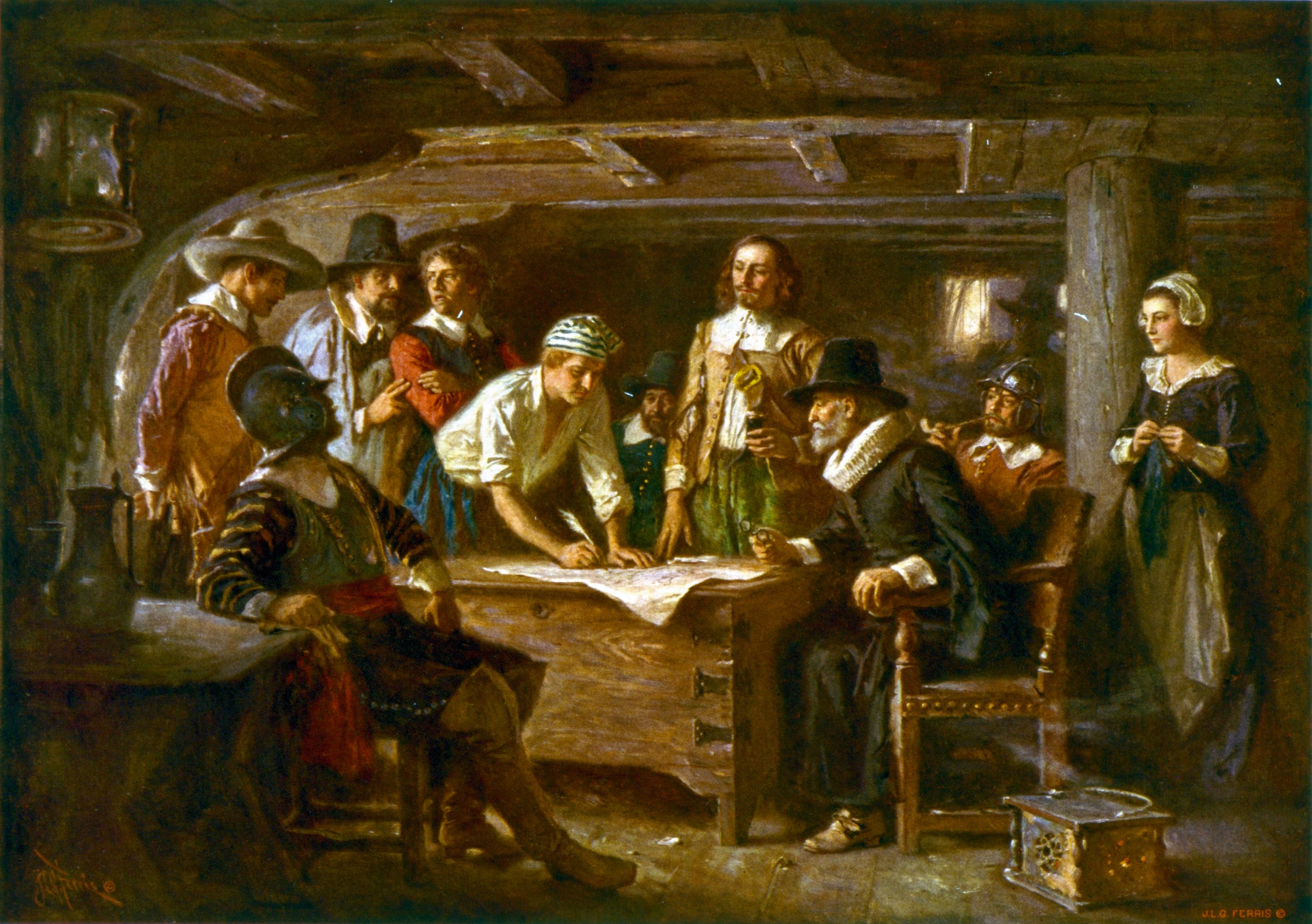
Signing the Mayflower Compact 1620, a painting by Jean Leon Gerome Ferris 1899

The Mayflower departed Plymouth, England on 6 or 16 September 1620. The small, 100-foot ship had 102 passengers and a crew of about 30–40 in extremely cramped conditions. By the second month out, the ship was being buffeted by strong westerly gales, causing the first ship's timbers to be badly shaken with caulking failing to keep out sea water, and with passengers, even in their berths, lying wet and ill. This, combined with a lack of proper rations and unsanitary conditions for several months, attributed to what would be fatal for many, especially the majority of women and children. On the way, there were two deaths, a crew member and a passenger, but the worst was yet to come after arriving at their destination when, in the space of several months, almost half the passengers perished in cold, harsh, unfamiliar New England winter.

On 9 or 19 November 1620, after about 3 months at sea, including a month of delays in England, they spotted land, which was the Cape Cod Hook, now called Provincetown Harbor. After several days of trying to get south to their planned destination of the Colony of Virginia, strong winter seas forced them to return to the harbor at Cape Cod hook, where they anchored on 11 or 21 November.

After arrival at Cape Cod, Francis Eaton was one of the men who signed the Mayflower Compact.

== In Plymouth Colony ==
William Bradford's observation on this family in his later years: "his first wife died in the general sickness, and he married again, and his 2 wife dyed, and he married the 3 and had by her 3 children. One of them is married and hath a child; the other are living, but one of them is an ideote. He dyed about 16 years ago. His son Samuel, who came over a sucking child, is also married, and hath a child."

In the 1623 Division of Land, Francis received four acres of land – one acre for himself, one for his deceased first wife Sarah, one for his son Samuel and one for his second wife Dorothy.

In 1626 Francis Eaton was one of twenty-seven Purchasers involved with the colony joint-stock company which afterwards was turned over to the control of senior colony members. That group was called Undertakers, and was made up of such as William Bradford, Myles Standish and Isaac Allerton initially who were later joined by Edward Winslow, William Brewster, John Howland, John Alden, Thomas Prence and others from London, former Merchant Adventurers. His name appears as "Franc Eaton" on the agreement dated 26 October 1626.

In the 1627 division of cattle, Francis and Christian Eaton, with children Samuel and Rachel, received a cow and two goats. The family had the tenth lot and were listed as "ffancis Eaton, wife Christian Eaton, Samuell Eaton, Rahell Eaton."

In 1631, apparently due to some severe financial problems, Eaton began selling off much of his landholdings; he sold four acres of land north of town "between the land of Capt. Myles Standish on the south side and one acre due unto Henry Sampson on the north side." On 25 June 1631 records state he sold a cow calf to Edward Winslow and noted terms of interest on the sale. On 30 December 1631 Francis Eaton sold twenty acres of land to William Brewster and then sold another ten-acre parcel to Brewster in the same area. About a week later, on 8 January 1631 or 1632, he sold his home to Winslow relatives of Edward Winslow – Kenelm, a brother, and Josiah, possibly his son.

On the tax rolls of 1633, Francis Eaton was taxed at the lowest tax rate, indicating a very low personal income. On that list, his name appears as "France Eaton."

== Family ==
Francis Eaton married:

- Sarah Morton Day, who married Eaton in England c. 1618–1619. She died during the first winter in the "general sickness." Her burial place is unknown. She is memorialized as "Sarah, first wife of Francis Eaton" on the Pilgrim Memorial Tomb, Cole's Hill, Plymouth.
- Dorothy ——, who is believed to have been the maidservant of Governor John Carver. They married c. 1621–1622. She died a year or two after the marriage in c. 1624. Bradford wrote of her: "married, and dyed a year or two after, here in this place." They had no children. Her burial place is unknown.
- Christian Penn, who arrived in Plymouth in the summer of 1623 on the Anne. She married Eaton in 1625 or early 1626 and had three children with him. She later married Francis Billington and had nine children by him. She died in Middleboro c. 1684; her burial place is at Nemasket Hill Cemetery.

Son of Francis and Sarah Eaton:

Samuel Eaton, born c. early 1620, came as, per Bradford, "a sucking child" on the Mayflower. He was apprenticed at age sixteen to John Cooke, who himself was a Mayflower passenger at age twelve. His apprenticeship began in October 1636. After his marriage, he moved north to Duxbury sometime in 1646 and moved to Middleboro about 1670, where he died c. 1684 and buried at Nemasket Hill Cemetery.

He married:

- Elizabeth ——, who he married before 10 March 1646. She died sometime between 1652 and 1661. They had two children.
- Martha Billington, who he married on 10 January in 1660 or 1661. She was his step-sister because of the marriage of his stepmother, Christian, to Francis Billington. They had four children.

Children of Francis and Christian Eaton:

- Rachel Eaton, who may have been born in late 1626 and who died in Plymouth between June 1656 and October 1661. She married Joseph Ramsdell (or Ramsden) in 1645 and had at least one son.
- Benjamin Eaton, who was born in March 1628 and died in Plympton on 16 January 1711 or 1712. He married Sarah Hoskins on 4 December 1660 and had at least four children.
- A third child was of unknown name or gender, and was listed by Bradford as "an idiot" and was still alive in 1651.

== Death, estate and burial ==
Francis Eaton died in the autumn of 1633, possibly as the result of an epidemic that spread through the colony that year and also claimed the lives of fellow Mayflower passengers Peter Browne and Samuel Fuller. By the time of his death, he was a freeman.

On 26 November 1633, the Plymouth Court proclaimed "…Francis Eaton, carpenter, late of Plymouth, deceased, died indebted far more than the estate…" Thomas Prence and John Doane were involved in the estate process with the probate inventory being drawn up the same day by James Hurst, Francis Cooke and Phineas Pratt, revealing how meager his estate was due to Eaton's dire financial situation.

Beginning in 1631, Eaton had sold off all his lands and house, likely due to his shortage of finances. At his death, his estate comprised only his livestock, household goods and carpentry tools, the total of which only made up one-third of the value of his total debts. Christian, his widow, was not held liable for his debts by the Court, which proclaimed that "… the widow be freed and acquitted from any claim or demand of all or any his creditors whatsoever."

Francis Eaton was buried on Burial Hill in Plymouth, Massachusetts Bay Colony.

== Burial of his wives ==
The burial place of his first wife Sarah is unknown, but she was most likely buried in an unmarked grave on Cole's Hill, the first Pilgrim burial location, as with so many others who died the first winter of 1621. She is memorialized on the Pilgrim Memorial Tomb (Sarcophagus) on Cole's Hill in Plymouth with: "Sarah, first wife of Francis Eaton."

The burial places of his second wife, Dorothy is unknown. His third wife, Christian, died in 1684 and is buried at Nemasket Hill Cemetery in Middleboro, MA with her step-son, Samuel Eaton, Mayflower passenger who also died in 1684.

== Sources ==
- Eugene Aubrey Stratton, Plymouth Colony: Its History and People, 1620-1691. (Salt Lake City: Ancestry Publishing, 1986) ISBN 9780916489182
- Caleb H. Johnson, The Mayflower and Her Passengers. (Indiana: Xlibris Corp., 2006) ISBN 9781462822379
