= John Carver (governor) =

Mayflower passenger and New World colonist

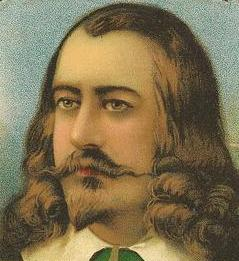

1st Governor of Plymouth Colony
- In office November 1620 – April 1621
- Preceded by: Office established
- Succeeded by: William Bradford

Personal details
- Born: Before 1584 Kingdom of England
- Died: April 1621 Plymouth Colony
- Resting place: Cole's Hill Burial Ground
- Spouses: Mary de Lannoy (m. 1609; died 1609) Katherine White (m. 1615–1621) (Note: marriage may have been earlier than 1615)
- Children: 2 (predeceased both parents)
- Occupation: Deacon
- Profession: Governor

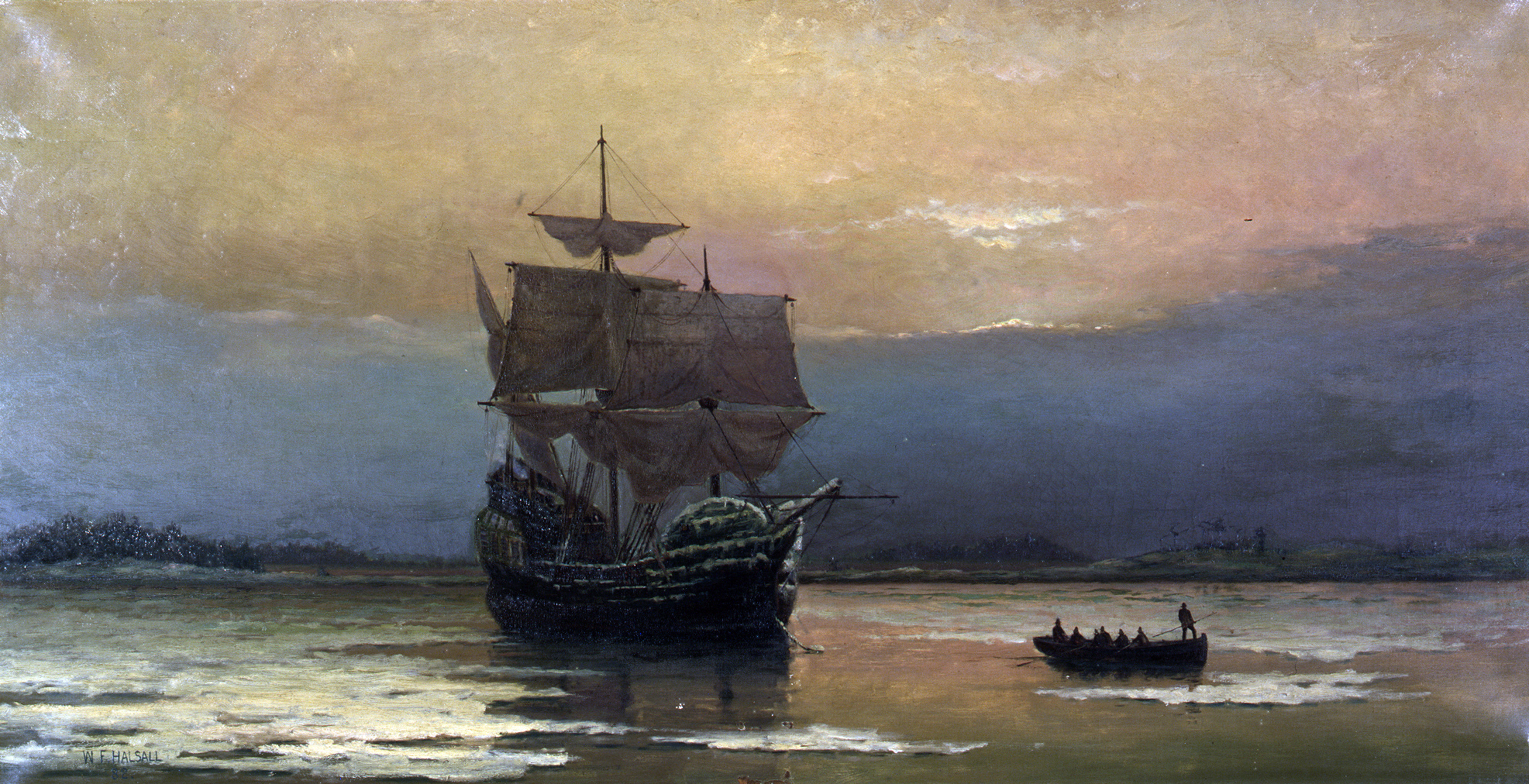
Mayflower in Plymouth Harbor by William Halsall (1882)

John Carver was one of the Pilgrims who made the Mayflower voyage in 1620 which resulted in the creation of Plymouth Colony in America. He is credited with writing the Mayflower Compact and was its first signer, and was also the first governor of Plymouth Colony.

== Life in Leiden ==
Little is known about Carver's ancestry or early family life. Jeremy Bangs notes that Carver and his wife Mary were members of the Walloon church in Leiden, Holland on February 8, 1609. The Flemish Walloon community was fleeing religious persecution in their homeland (then part of the Spanish Netherlands, now split between Belgium and France), as were the Puritan separatists who came to Holland from England around 1607.

Carver was a deacon in Leiden around 1609 at about age 25, and he is believed to have been born sometime before 1584. Leiden records of St. Pancras Church state that Carver buried a child on July 10, 1609. Sometime shortly after the death of the child, his wife Mary died. He later married Katherine White who was a prominent member of the Leiden English separatist church, though the exact date is unknown. She was originally of Sturton in Nottinghamshire, eldest daughter of Alexander White. Carver became much more involved in the Leiden church after marrying Katherine, making a close association with Puritan pastor John Robinson, husband of Katherine's younger sister Bridget.

== Preparing for the New World ==
Carver and Robert Cushman began negotiations with officials of the Virginia Company in London in 1617 for land in the Colony of Virginia where they could live and be self-governing. They came in contact with Sir Edwin Sandys, an acquaintance of church elder William Brewster and a leading member of the Virginia Company. They had to put together seven articles for the Council for Virginia, signed by all the senior Puritan church members, which acknowledged the supremacy of the king and the Church of England.

To fund the Mayflower voyage, the Leiden congregation turned to Thomas Weston and the Merchant Adventurers, London businessmen interested in supporting the voyage in hopes of profit. Carver had the task of organizing the voyage and negotiating funding with Weston and the Adventurers along with Cushman as the chief agent. In 1620, they were in Aldgate, London where they negotiated with Weston for financial backing. Weston hired the Mayflower, and it sailed from London to Southampton to rendezvous with the Speedwell, which was carrying the Pilgrims from Leiden in Holland. Carver was in Southampton in June 1620 purchasing supplies for the Mayflower voyage, along with Christopher Martin. Carver was very wealthy and provided much of his personal fortune to invest in the joint-stock company and in the Mayflower voyage itself.

== Mayflower voyage ==
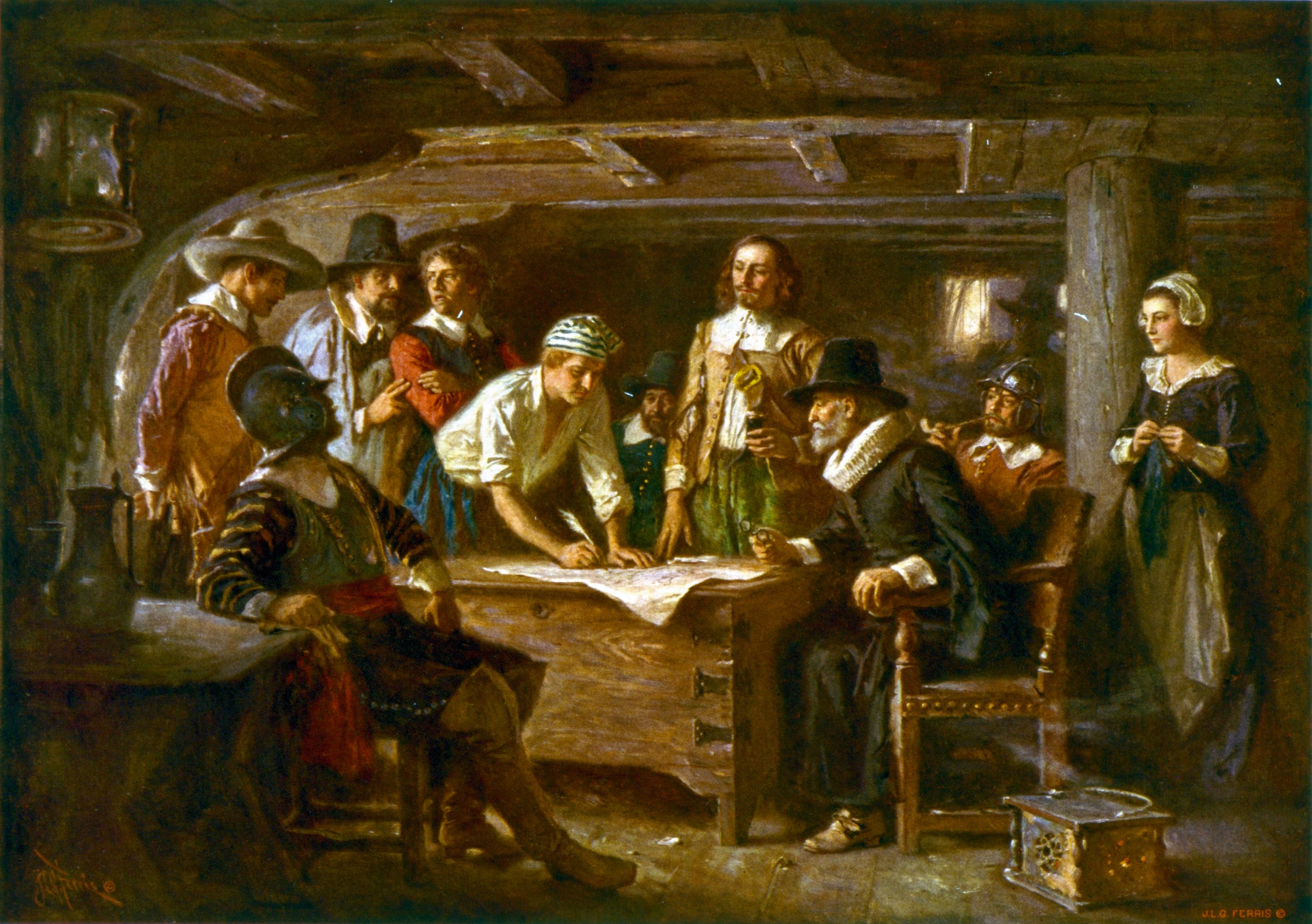
Signing the Mayflower Compact 1620, a painting by Jean Leon Gerome Ferris, 1899

Carver and his wife Katherine boarded Mayflower with five servants and seven year-old Jasper More, one of the four children of the More family who were sent in the care of the Pilgrims. Carver seems to have been elected governor of the Mayflower for the duration of the Atlantic crossing.

The Mayflower anchored off Cape Cod in November, 1620, and the Mayflower Compact was signed aboard ship on November 11; it became the first governing document for Plymouth Colony. Carver may have been the author of the Compact, and was definitely its first signer. He was subsequently chosen to be governor of Plymouth Colony.

== Life in Plymouth ==
The first winter in Plymouth Colony was exceedingly difficult, as the colonists suffered greatly from lack of shelter, diseases such as scurvy, and general conditions on board ship. Nearly half the Mayflower passengers died in the course of a few months. The first will drawn up in New England was that of William Mullins, and it was written on his behalf by Carver while Mullins was on his deathbed. It was signed as the last will and testament of Mullins by Carver, Mayflower's captain Christopher Jones, and the ship's surgeon Giles Heale. This is the only known copy of Carver's signature.

On March 22, 1621, Governor Carver and Wampanoag leader Massasoit worked out a treaty of peace and mutual protection. This treaty lasted for more than half a century.

== Family ==
John Carver married Mary de Lannoy sometime before February 8, 1609. She was a Walloon (Huguenot) of L’Escluse, France. She may have been related to Philip de Lannoy (Delano), who came to Plymouth on the Fortune in November 1621. The couple buried a child at St. Pancras in Leiden on July 10, 1609; Mary died soon after in July 1609.

He married Katherine (White) Leggatt sometime before May 22, 1615. She was the widow of George Leggatt. Mayflower genealogist Robert S. Wakefield spells her name as Catherine, but seventeenth century documents use Katherine. She died sometime in May 1621, some 5–6 weeks after Carver's death. John and Katherine buried a child at St. Pancras in Leiden November 11, 1617. He had no known surviving descendants.

== Death ==
Carver had been working in his field on a hot day in April 1621 when he complained of a pain in his head. He returned to his house to lie down and soon fell into a coma, and he died within a few days, not long after April 5, 1621. William Bradford was chosen to replace him as governor; Bradford was recovering from illness, so Isaac Allerton was chosen to be his assistant.

Carver died in April or May 1621, aged 56 years, and his wife died five or six weeks later. After all the secret burials that were performed all winter, the settlers wished to bury the governor with as much ceremony as possible. Bradford wrote in April 1621:

He was buried in the best manner they could, with some vollies of shot by all that bore armes; and his wife, being weak, died within five or six weeks after him.

== In popular culture ==
In the 2023 slasher film Thanksgiving, masks of Carver's face are distributed by Plymouth businesses to promote the holiday. Along with a traditional pilgrim's capotain, the killer uses one as a disguise and becomes known by the name "John Carver," serving the film as a double entendre.
