= Jean Leon Gerome Ferris =

American painter (1863–1930)

- Portrait of Gerome Ferris by his father Stephen James Ferris, 1894
- Born: August 8, 1863; Philadelphia, Pennsylvania, U.S.
- Died: March 18, 1930 (aged 66); Philadelphia, Pennsylvania, U.S.
- Education: Pennsylvania Academy of the Fine Arts
- Known for: Painting

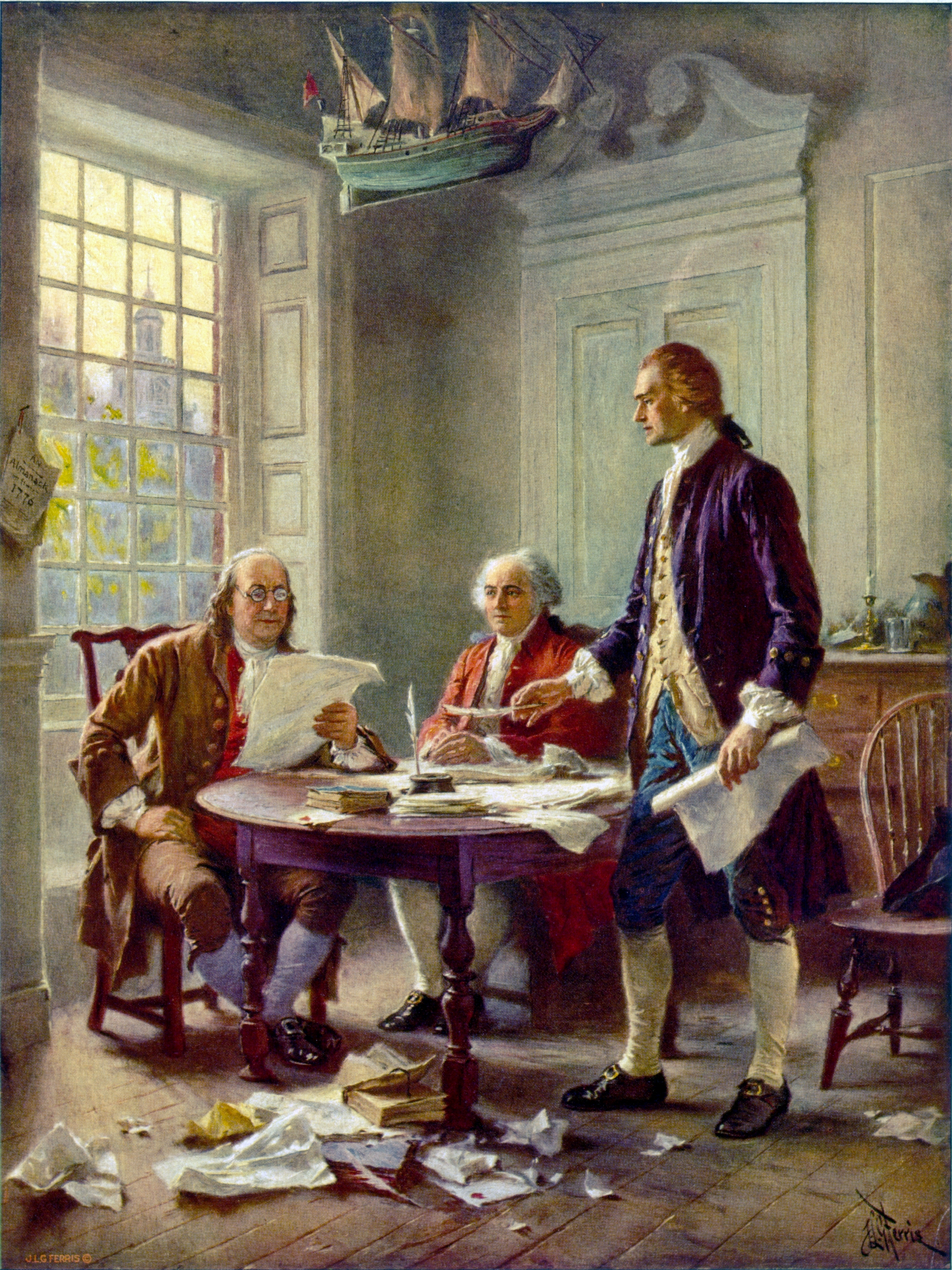
Writing the Declaration of Independence, 1776, Ferris' 1900 depiction of (left to right) Benjamin Franklin, John Adams, and Thomas Jefferson of the Committee of Five working on the Declaration of Independence; the depiction was widely reprinted.

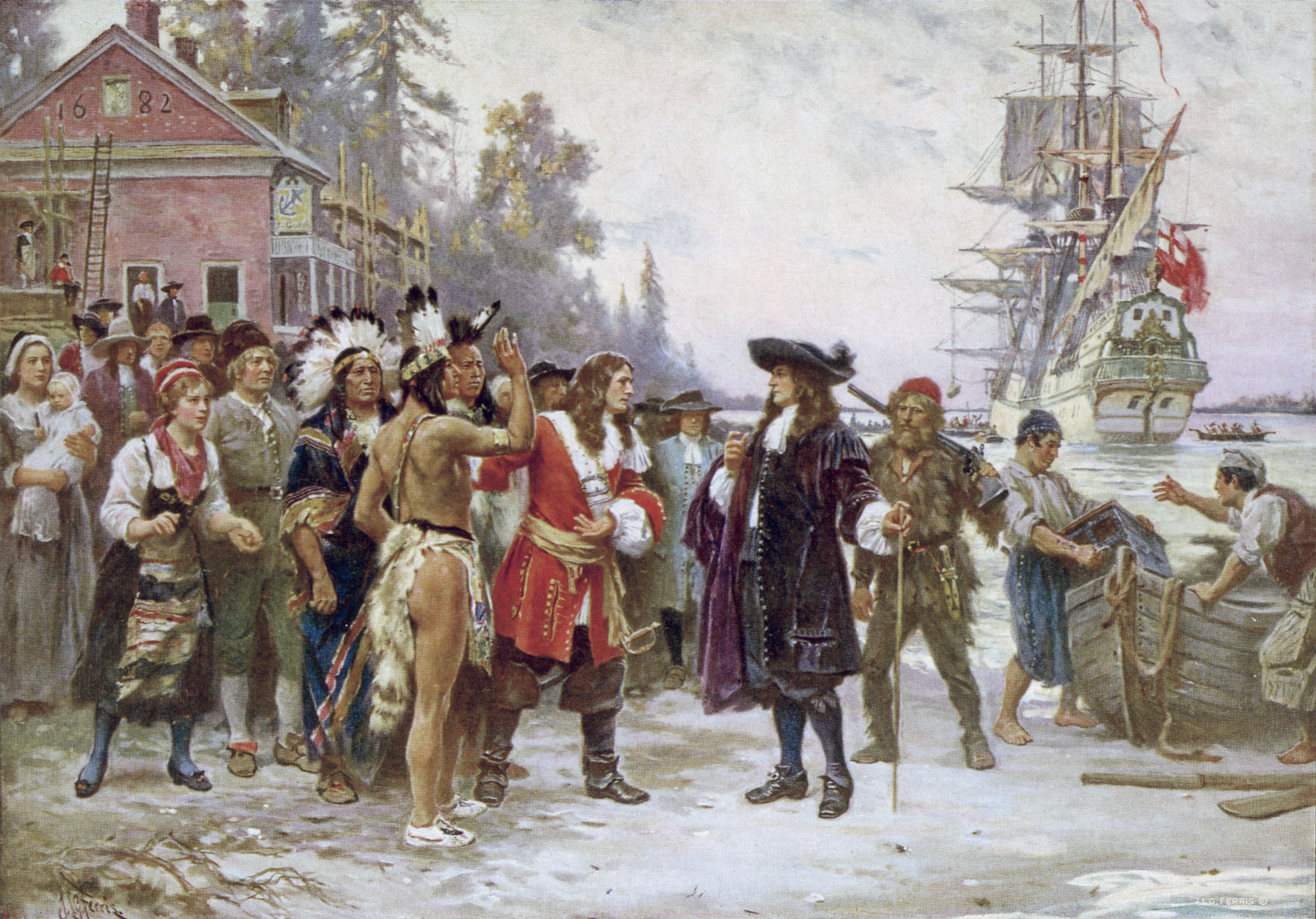
The Landing of William Penn, Ferris' portrait depicting the New Castle, Delaware landing by William Penn, the founder of the Province of Pennsylvania

Jean Leon Gerome Ferris (August 8, 1863 – March 18, 1930) was an American painter best known for his series of 78 scenes from American history, entitled The Pageant of a Nation, the largest series of American historical paintings by a single artist.

== Early life and education ==
Born in Philadelphia, Pennsylvania, Ferris was the son of Stephen James Ferris (1835-1915) : a portrait painter who was a devotee of Jean-Léon Gérôme (his teacher after whom he was named), and also an admirer of Mariano Fortuny. He grew up around art; he was trained by his father and his uncles Edward Moran and Thomas Moran were both acclaimed painters.

Ferris enrolled in the Pennsylvania Academy of the Fine Arts in 1879 and trained further at the Académie Julian beginning in 1883 under William-Adolphe Bouguereau. He also met his namesake Jean-Léon Gérôme, who greatly influenced his decision to paint scenes from American history. Ferris wrote, "[Gérôme's] axiom was that one would paint best that with which he is most familiar".

== Career ==
His early subjects were Orientalist in nature since that movement was in vogue when he was young. In 1882, he exhibited a painting entitled Feeding the Ibis which was valued at $600. By 1895, he had gained a reputation as a historical painter, and he embarked on his dream of creating a series of paintings that told a historical narrative.

In 1898, he sold General Howe's Levee, 1777, but he later realized that such a series could not be complete if the separate paintings could not be kept together. Consequently, he never sold another, but he did sell the reproduction rights to various publishing companies. This had the effect of greatly popularizing his work, as these companies made prints, postcards, calendars, and blank-backed trade cards to use in advertisements. Laminated cards of these works were still being sold as late as 1984.

== Personal life ==
Ferris married Annette Amelia Ryder in 1894, and the couple had a daughter named Elizabeth Mary. He died in Philadelphia, Pennsylvania in 1930 at age 66.

== Legacy ==
The paintings showed idealized portrayals of famous moments from American history. The complete series was shown at Congress Hall in Philadelphia from 1913 to 1930. In later years, it was shown in a number of locations, including the Smithsonian Institution, before being returned to the Ferris family. His works were widely popular for many years, but modern critics are far less generous in their praise.

In a history of the art collection of Independence National Historical Park, art historian Doris D. Fanelli claims that his historical paintings confuse "verity with verisimilitude" in that they create "a bridge between fact and fiction" through idealized representation, and art historian Gerald Ackerman describes them as "splendid in the accuracy of accessories, clothing and especially in the details of land conveyances and ships", but "extremely dry in execution and rather monotonous in composition."

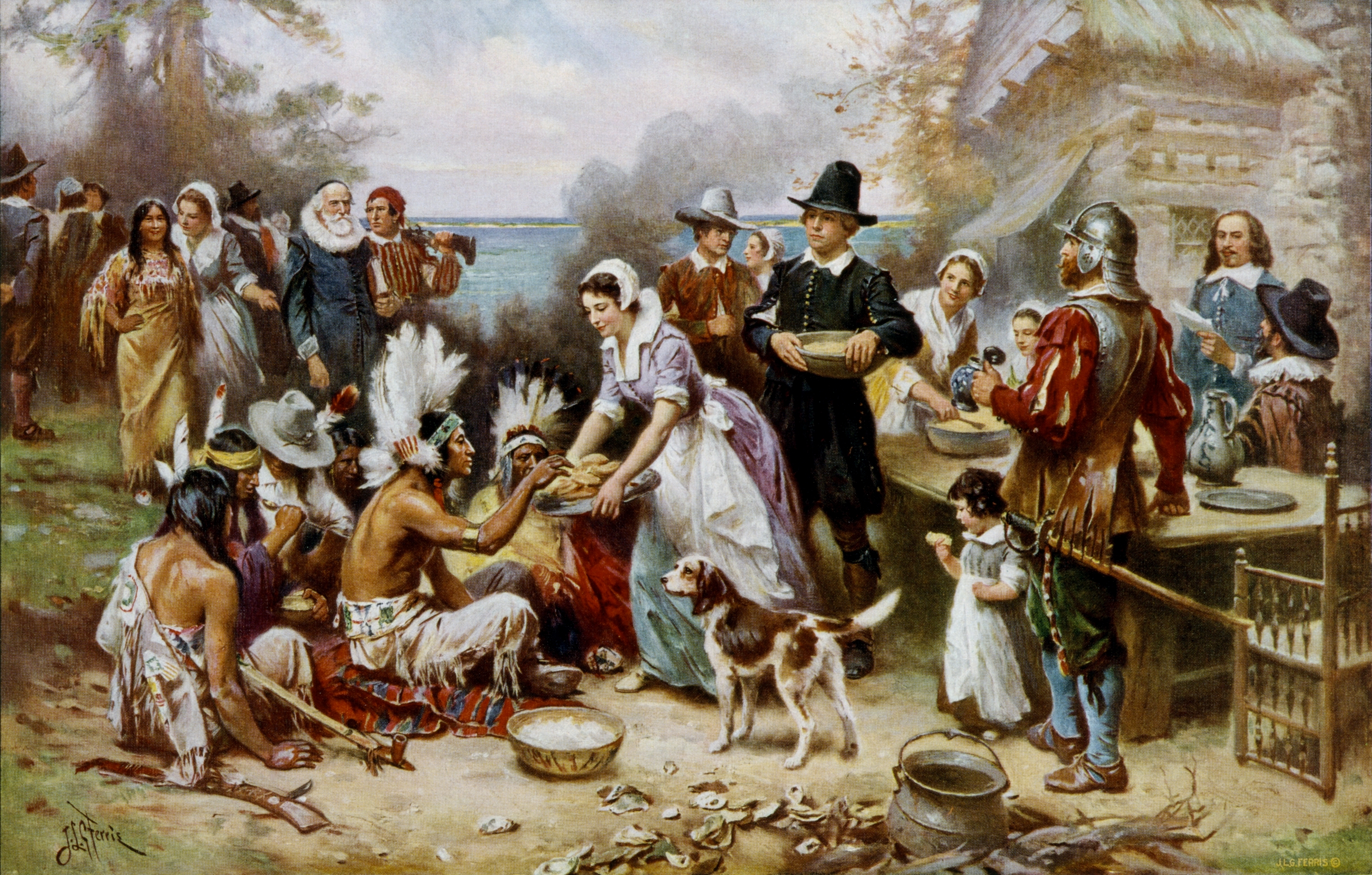
The First Thanksgiving 1621
