= Mayflower =

17th-century ship of American colonists

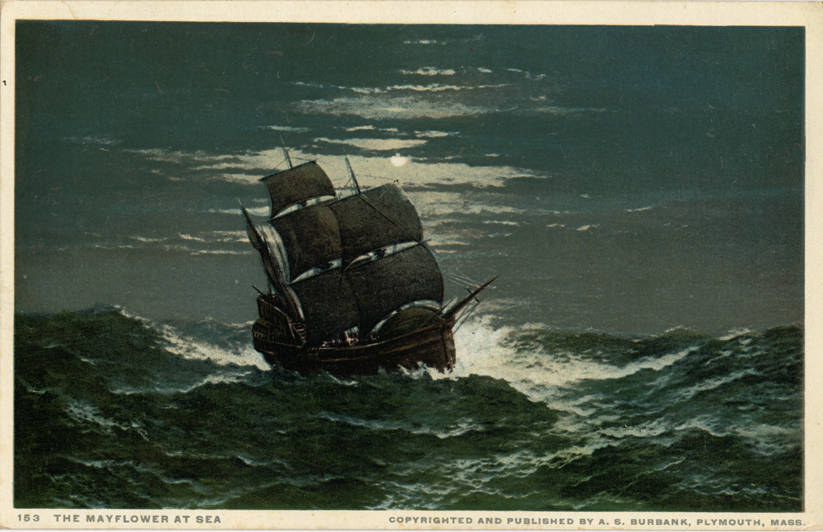
- Mayflower imagined at sea on an early 20th century post card

History

England
- Name: Mayflower
- Owner: Christopher Jones (1/4 of the ship)
- Maiden voyage: Before 1609
- Out of service: 1622–1624
- Fate: Most likely taken apart by a Rotherhithe shipbreaker in 1624

General characteristics
- Class & type: Probably English-built merchant ship
- Tonnage: 180+ tons
- Length: ~80–90 ft (24–27 m) on deck, 100–110 ft (30–34 m) overall
- Beam: ~25 ft (7.5 m)
- Decks: Around 4
- Capacity: Unknown, but carried approximately 135 people to Plymouth Colony

Mayflower was an English square-rigged merchant sailing ship, active from before 1609 until 1622. Her tonnage was 180+, and she was 110 feet (34 meters) long and 25 feet (7.5 meters) in the beam, with several decks. She was notable in that she transported a group of English families, known today as the Pilgrims, from England to the New World in 1620.

After 10 weeks at sea, Mayflower, with 102 passengers and a crew of about 30, reached what is today the United States, dropping anchor near the tip of Cape Cod, Massachusetts on 21 November [O.S. 11 November] 1620. The Pilgrims, often conflated with the Puritans (who sought to reform and purify the Church of England from within), sought separation from the church and prayed privately. They believed that the church's resistance to reform and its Roman Catholic past left it beyond redemption. Starting in 1608, a group of English families departed England for the Netherlands, where they could worship freely. By 1620, the community resolved to cross the Atlantic Ocean for America, which they considered a "new Promised Land" where they would establish Plymouth Colony.

The Pilgrims had originally hoped to reach America by early October using two ships, and had a second arranged for the voyage, Speedwell, which, however, proved unseaworthy and so was left behind in England. The ensuing delays and complications restricted the Pilgrims' journey to a single ship, Mayflower. Before disembarking from her, they wrote and signed the Mayflower Compact, an agreement that established a rudimentary government in which each member would contribute to the safety and welfare of the planned settlement. Arriving in November, they were unprepared to endure a harsh winter. Local indigenous peoples assisted the colonists in gathering food, but only half of the original Pilgrims survived the first winter at Plymouth following an outbreak of disease. The following year, the survivors celebrated the colony's first fall harvest along with 90 Wampanoag people, an occasion declared in centuries later as the first American Thanksgiving. As one of the earliest colonial vessels, Mayflower has become a cultural icon in the history of the United States.

No record of the ship herself exists after 1624, when she was appraised at Rotherhithe; she is believed to have been broken up and her timbers used for building construction.

== Motivations for the voyage ==
A congregation of approximately 400 English Protestants living in exile in Leiden, Holland were dissatisfied with the failure of the Church of England to eliminate its excesses and abuses. Rather than work for change in England (as other Puritans did), they chose to live as separatists in religiously tolerant Holland in 1608. As separatists, they were considered illegal radicals by their home country.

The Leiden government's reputation for offering financial aid to reformed English, French and German churches caused the city to become a desirable destination for Protestant intellectuals. Many of the separatists were members of an illegal church in Nottinghamshire, England, secretly practicing their Puritan form of Protestantism. When they learned that the authorities were aware of their congregation, church members hurriedly fled in the night without most of their possessions and clandestinely traveled to Holland.

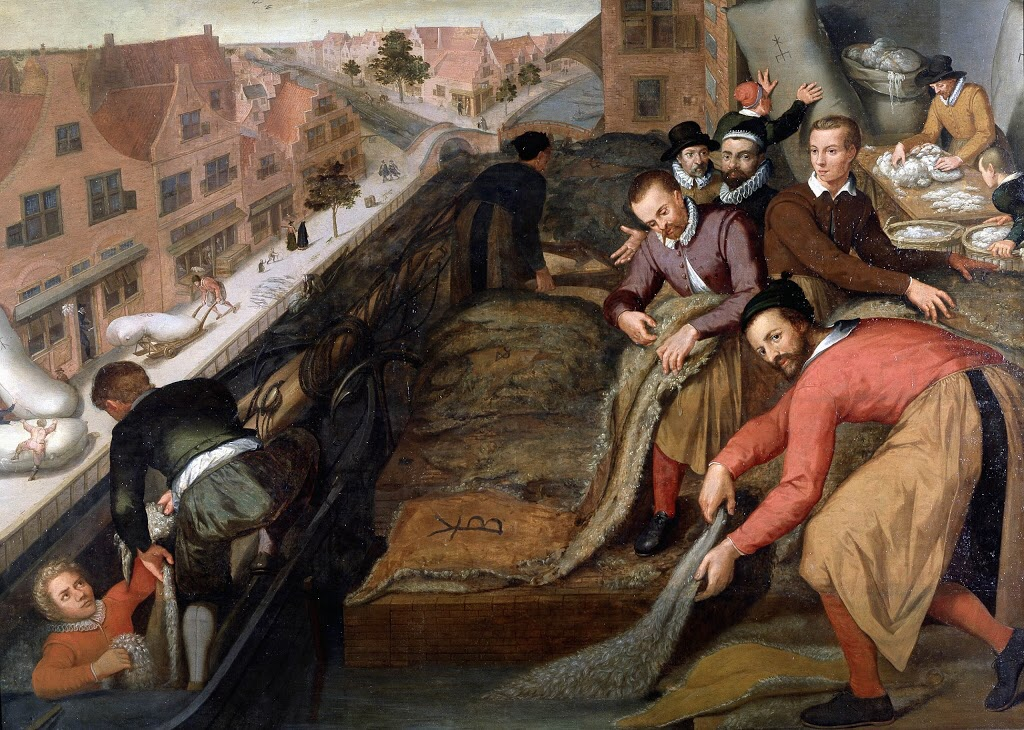
Painting by Isaac Claesz Van Swanenburg of workers in Leiden's wool industry

Life in Holland became increasingly difficult for the congregation. They were forced into menial and backbreaking jobs such as cleaning wool, which led to a variety of health afflictions. In addition, a number of the country's leading theologians began engaging in open debates that led to civil unrest, instilling the fear that Spain might again place Holland's population under siege as it had done years earlier. English king James I formed an alliance with Holland against Spain, with a condition outlawing independent English church congregations in Holland. These became the separatists' motivating factors to sail for the New World, beyond the reach of King James and his bishops.

Their desire to travel to America was considered audacious and risky, as previous attempts to settle in North America had failed. During the 1609–10 winter period known as the Starving Time in the Jamestown settlement of the Virginia Colony, 440 of the town's 500 settlers died of starvation. The Puritan separatists also learned of the constant threat of attacks by indigenous peoples. Despite all of the arguments against traveling to the new land, the separatists held a conviction that God had willed them to make the voyage. They wrote, "We verily believe and trust the Lord is with us and that he will graciously prosper our indeavours, according to the simplicity of our hearts therein."

== Voyage ==
=== Leaving Holland ===
After deciding to leave Holland, the Pilgrims planned to cross the Atlantic using two purchased ships. The small ship Speedwell would first carry them from Leiden to England, and the larger Mayflower would transport most of the passengers and supplies across the ocean.

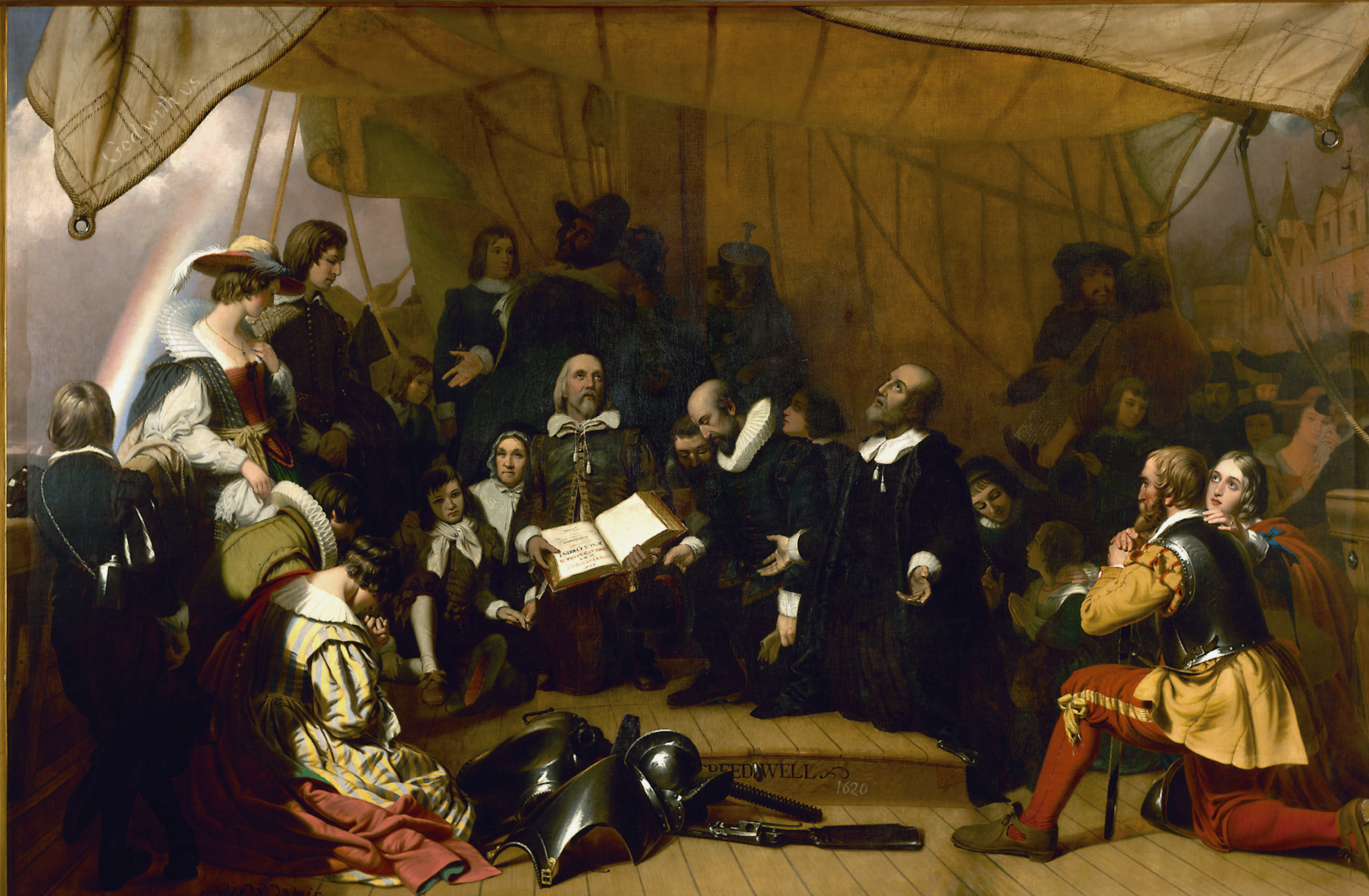
Pilgrims John Carver, William Bradford and Myles Standish at prayer during their voyage to North America. 1844 painting by Robert Walter Weir.

Some of the Separatists were unable to depart, as they did not have enough time to settle their affairs and were unable to afford the necessary travel supplies. The congregation decided that the younger and stronger members should embark on the first journey, with others possibly following in the future. Although the congregation had been led by John Robinson, who first proposed the idea of emigrating to America, he chose to remain in Leiden to care for those who could not make the voyage.

In explaining to his congregation why they should emigrate, Robinson used the analogy of the ancient Israelites leaving Babylon to escape bondage by returning to Jerusalem, where they would build their temple. "The Pilgrims and Puritans actually referred to themselves as God's New Israel", writes Peter Marshall. It was therefore considered the destiny of the Pilgrims and Puritans to similarly build a "spiritual Jerusalem" in America.

When it was time to leave, the ship's senior leader, Edward Winslow, described the scene of families being separated at the departure: "A flood of tears was poured out. Those not sailing accompanied us to the ship, but were not able to speak to one another for the abundance of sorrow before parting." William Bradford, another leader who would be the second governor of the Plymouth Colony, similarly described the departure:

Truly doleful was the sight of that sad and mournful parting. To see what sighs and sobs and prayers did sound among them; what tears did gush from every eye, and pithy speeches pierced each heart...their Reverend Pastor, falling down on his knees, and they all with him...

The trip to the south coast of England took three days, where the ship took anchor at Southampton on 5 August [O.S. 26 July], 1620. At Southampton, the Pilgrims first saw Mayflower, which was being loaded with provisions.

=== Speedwell and Mayflower ===
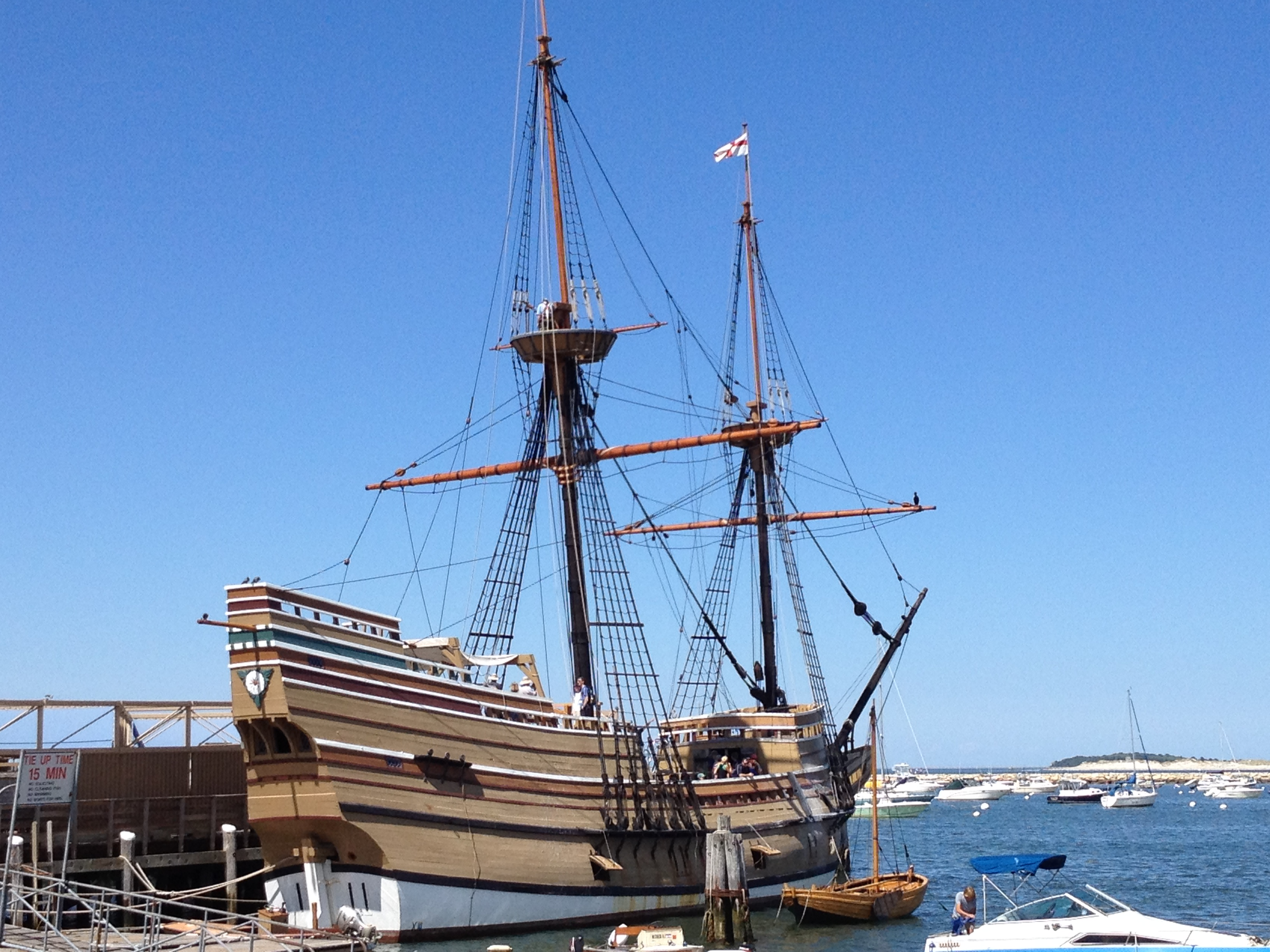
Mayflower II, a replica of the original Mayflower, docked at Plymouth, Massachusetts

Carrying about 65 passengers, Mayflower left London in mid-July 1620. The ship proceeded down the Thames to the south coast of England, where it anchored at Southampton, Hampshire. While there, she awaited the planned rendezvous on 22 July with the Speedwell, arriving from Holland with members of the Leiden congregation. Although both ships planned to depart for America by the end of July, a leak was discovered on Speedwell that required repair.

The ships set sail for America around 5 August, but Speedwell sprang another leak shortly after, necessitating the ships' return to Dartmouth for repairs. They made a new start after the repairs, but more than 200 miles (320 km) beyond Land's End at the southwestern tip of England, Speedwell sprang a third leak. As it was now early September, with vital funds having been wasted that were crucial to the success of the Pilgrims' settlement in America, Speedwell's journey was scrapped. Both ships returned to Plymouth, England, where 20 Speedwell passengers joined the overcrowded Mayflower, while the others returned to Holland.

The Mayflower crew waited for seven more days until the intensity of the wind increased. William Bradford was especially worried, writing, "We lie here waiting for as fair a wind as can blow... Our victuals will be half eaten up, I think, before we go from the coast of England; and, if our voyage last long, we shall not have a month's victuals when we come in the country." According to Bradford, Speedwell was refitted and seaworthy, having "made many voyages... to the great profit of her owners." He suggested that Speedwell's master may have used "cunning and deceit" to abort the voyage by causing the leaks, fearing starvation and death in America.

=== Mayflower sets sail ===
At last the over-full and hitherto baffled Mayflower was ready for the third trial. This final voyage would be successful. On 26 September 1620, the gallant little craft slipped out to sea. In proportion to her cubic feet of space, no heavier cargo had ever been shipped across the Atlantic. The entirety of a new church, a new commonwealth, a new nation, all of which were to bless the world, were confined within the limits of Mayflower's hold. The course of empire was moving westward indeed.

— Rev. E. W. Bishop

In early September, western gales turned the North Atlantic into a dangerous place to sail. Mayflower's provisions were already quite low when departing Southampton, and they became lower still by delays of more than a month. The passengers had been on board the ship this entire time, weary and ill-prepared for a very taxing, lengthy Atlantic journey in the cramped spaces of a small ship.

When Mayflower sailed from Plymouth alone on 16 September [O.S. 6 September] 1620, with what Bradford called "a prosperous wind", she carried 102 passengers and a crew of 25 to 30 officers and men, bringing the total aboard to approximately 130. At about 180 tons, she was considered a smaller cargo ship, having traveled mainly between England and Bordeaux with clothing and wine, not an ocean ship. (Note: A good, strong ship was at least 300 tons, which made Mayflower relatively small.) Mayflower's physical condition was suboptimal, as she was sold for scrap four years after her Atlantic voyage. She was a high-built craft forward and aft, measuring approximately 100 feet (30 m) in length and about 25 feet (7.6 m) at her widest point.

=== Voyage across the Atlantic ===
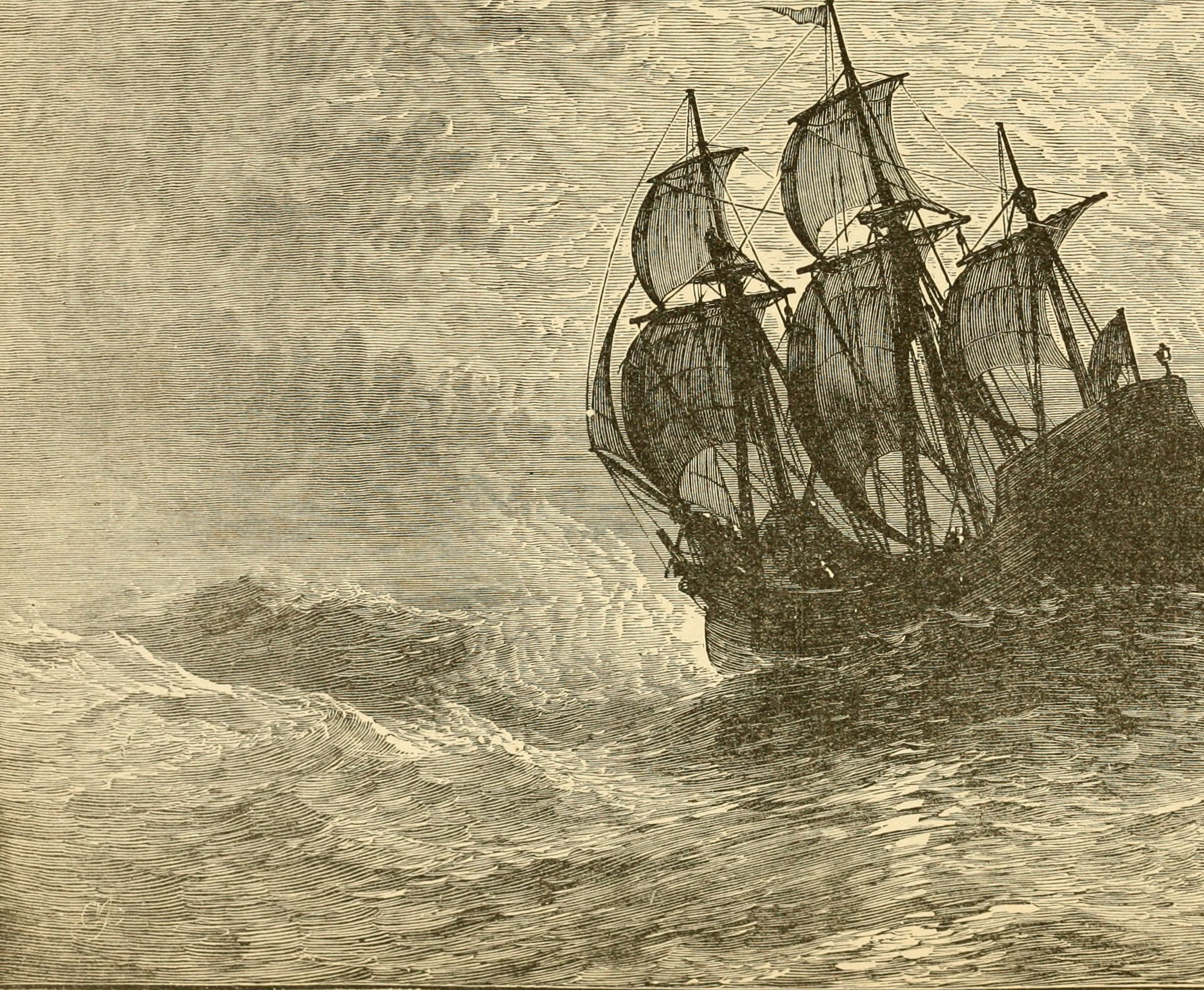
Mayflower at sea, drawing from a book, c. 1893

The living quarters for the 102 passengers were cramped, with the living area about 20 by 80 feet (6 by 24 m) or 1,600 square feet (150 m^{2}) and the ceiling about five feet (1.5 m) high. The cabins were thin-walled and extremely cramped. The maximum possible space for each person would have been slightly less than the size of a modern-day single bed. With couples and children packed closely together for a trip lasting two months, a great deal of trust and confidence was required among everyone aboard.

John Carver, one of the leaders on the ship, often inspired the Pilgrims with a "sense of earthly grandeur and divine purpose". He was later called the "Moses of the Pilgrims", notes historian Jon Meacham. Author Rebecca Fraser wrote that the Pilgrims "believed they had a covenant like the Jewish people of old" and that "America was the new Promised Land". American writer James Russell Lowell stated, "Next to the fugitives whom Moses led out of Egypt, the little shipload of outcasts who landed at Plymouth are destined to influence the future of the world."

The first half of the voyage proceeded over calm seas and under pleasant skies. Then the weather changed, with continuous northeasterly storms and huge waves constantly crashing against the topside deck. In the midst of one storm, William Butten, the young, indentured servant of physician Samuel Fuller, died—the sole fatality of the voyage—and was buried at sea. A baby was also born, christened Oceanus Hopkins. During another storm, so fierce that the sails could not be used, the ship was forced to drift without hoisting its sails for days to avoid losing her masts. The storm washed passenger John Howland overboard. He sank about 12 feet (4 m) but was rescued when a crew member threw him a rope.

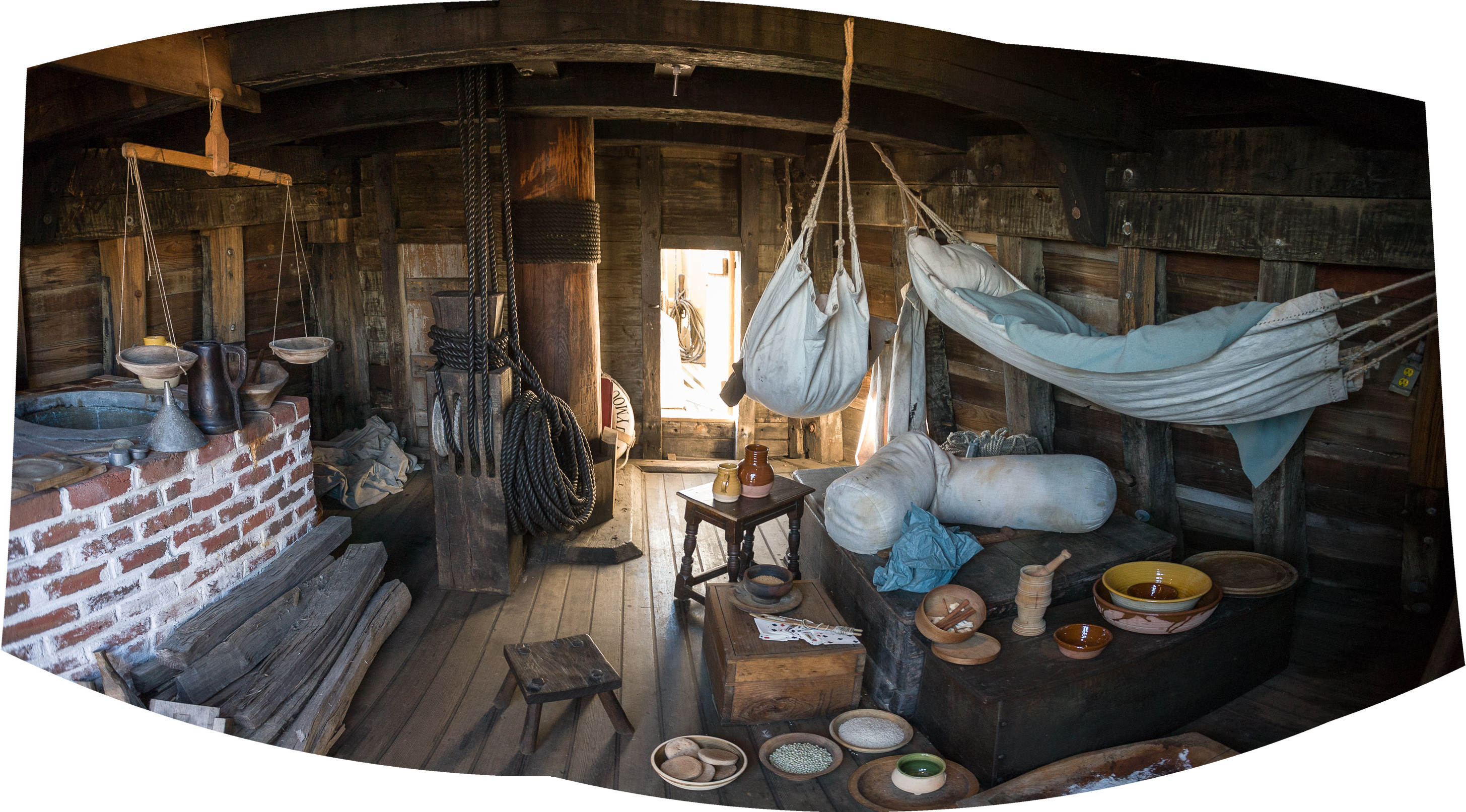
Mayflower II cabin interior

The passengers were forced to crouch in semi-darkness below deck. A great deal of seawater from the large and violent waves accumulated aboard the ship and soaked everyone and everything both above and below deck. In mid-ocean, the ship nearly became totally disabled and might have had to return to England or risk sinking. A storm had so badly damaged its main beam that even the sailors despaired. By a stroke of luck, one of the colonists had a metal jackscrew that he had purchased in Holland to help in the construction of the settlers' homes. The crew used the jackscrew to secure the beam, which kept it from cracking further, maintaining the seaworthiness of the vessel.

The ship's cargo included many essential stores that the Pilgrims would need for their journey and future lives. It is assumed that they carried tools, food, weapons and live animals, including dogs, sheep, goats, pigs and poultry, although no cattle or beasts of draft or burden were aboard. The ship held two small 21-foot (6 m) boats powered by oars or sails. There were also artillery pieces aboard to defend the ship from enemy European forces or indigenous tribes.

== Arrival in America ==
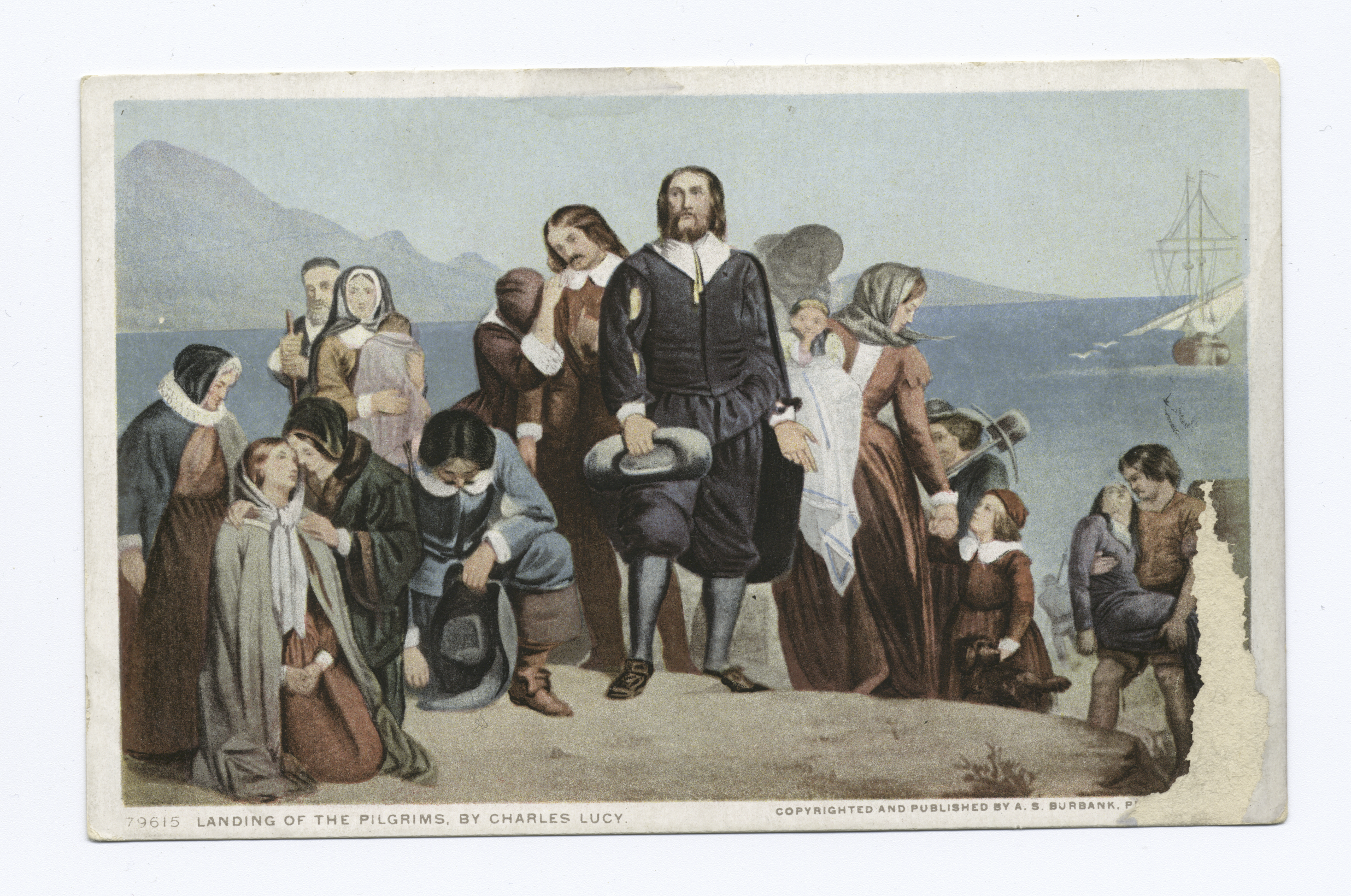
Landing of the Pilgrims, painting by Charles Lucy (c. 1898)

On 19 November [O.S. 9 November] 1620, the crew sighted present-day Cape Cod. They spent several days trying to sail south to their planned destination of the Colony of Virginia, where they had obtained permission to settle from the Company of Merchant Adventurers of London. However, the strong winter seas forced them to return to the harbor at Cape Cod hook, known today as Provincetown Harbor, and with supplies running short, they set anchor on 21 November [O.S. 11 November].

It was before setting anchor that the male Pilgrims and non-Pilgrim passengers (whom the Pilgrims called "strangers") wrote and signed the Mayflower Compact. Among the resolutions in the compact were those establishing legal order meant to quell increasing strife within the ranks. Myles Standish was selected to ensure that the rules were obeyed, as there was a consensus that discipline must be enforced to ensure the survival of the planned colony. After the men had agreed to settle and build a self-governing community, the passengers disembarked.

The moment when the Pilgrims stepped ashore was described by William Bradford, the second governor of the Plymouth Colony:

Being thus arrived in a good harbor and brought safe to land, they fell upon their knees and blessed the God of heaven, who had brought them over the vast and furious ocean, and delivered them from all the perils and miseries thereof, again to set their feet on the firm and stable earth, their proper element.

=== First winter ===
Plymouth Colony was the first experiment in consensual government in Western history between individuals with one another, and not with a monarch. The colony was a mutual enterprise, not an imperial expedition organized by the Spanish or English governments. In order to survive, it depended on the consent of the colonists themselves. Necessary in order to bind the community together, it was revolutionary by chance.

— Author Rebecca Fraser

On Monday, 7 December [O.S. 27 November], an exploring expedition was launched under the direction of Capt. Christopher Jones to find a suitable settlement site. There were 34 people in the open small boat, 24 passengers and 10 sailors. They were ill-prepared for the bitter winter weather that they encountered, which was much colder than what they had experienced in England. The weather forced them to spend the night ashore, ill-clad in below-freezing temperatures with wet shoes and stockings that froze overnight. Bradford wrote, "Some of our people that are dead took the original of their death here".

Plymouth faced many difficulties during its first winter, most notably the risk of starvation and the lack of suitable shelter. The Pilgrims did not know that the ground would be frozen by mid-November, eliminating the possibility of planting crops. They were also unprepared for the snowstorms that would make the countryside impassable without snowshoes. In their haste to leave England, the Pilgrims failed to bring any fishing rods.

From the beginning, the Pilgrims received vital assistance from the natives in the area. One colonist's journal reported, "We dug and found some more corn, two or three baskets full, and a bag of beans. ... In all we had about ten bushels, which will be enough for seed. It is with God's help that we found this corn, for how else could we have done it, without meeting some Indians who might trouble us." Governor Bradford maintained hope:

Friends, if ever we make a plantation, God works a miracle! Especially considering how scant we shall be of victuals; and, most of all, ununited amongst ourselves, and devoid of good tutors and leaders. Violence will break all. Where is the meek and humble spirit of Moses and of Nehemiah, who re-edified the walls of Jerusalem, and the State of Israel? ... I see not, in reason, how we shall escape, even the gasping of hunger-starved persons: but God can do much; and his will be done!"

During the winter, the passengers remained aboard Mayflower, suffering an outbreak of a contagious disease described as a mixture of scurvy, pneumonia and tuberculosis. When the disease subsided, only 53 passengers remained—just more than half of the original total—and approximately half of the crew died. In the spring, they built huts ashore, and the passengers disembarked from Mayflower on 31 March [O.S. 21 March], 1621.

Historian Benson John Lossing described that first settlement:

After many hardships ... the Pilgrim Fathers first set foot December, 1620 upon a bare rock on the bleak coast of Massachusetts Bay, while all around the earth was covered with deep snow ... Dreary, indeed, was the prospect before them. Exposure and privations had prostrated one half of the men before the first blow of the ax had been struck to build a habitation. ... One by one perished. The governor and his wife died in April 1621; and on the first of that month, forty-six of the one hundred emigrants were in their graves, nineteen of whom were signers of the Mayflower Compact.

Jones had originally planned to return to England as soon as the Pilgrims found a settlement site, but his crew members were ravaged by the same diseases that were felling the Pilgrims, and he realized that he must remain in Plymouth Harbor "till he saw his men began to recover." Mayflower lay in New Plymouth harbor through the winter of 1620–21 and set sail for England on 15 April [O.S. 5 April] 1621. As with the Pilgrims, her sailors had been decimated by disease. Jones had lost his boatswain, his gunner, three quartermasters, the cook and more than a dozen sailors. Mayflower made excellent time on her voyage back to England. The westerly winds that had buffeted her on the initial voyage pushed her along on the return trip. She arrived in London on 16 May [O.S. 6 May] 1621 in less than half the time that it had taken her to sail to America. (Note: Jones died after coming back from a voyage to France on March 5, 1622, at about age 52. For the next two years, Mayflower lay at her berth in Rotherhithe, not far from Jones's grave at St. Mary's church. By 1624, she was no longer useful as a ship; her subsequent fate is unknown, but she was probably broken up about that time.)

== Passengers ==
Some families traveled together, while some men came alone, leaving families in England and Leiden. More than one third of the passengers were Separatists who sought to leave the Church of England and create a society that incorporated their own religious ideals. Other passengers were hired hands, servants or farmers recruited by London merchants, all originally destined for the Colony of Virginia.

Passengers passed the time by reading by candlelight or playing cards and games. They consumed large amounts of alcohol such as beer with meals. This was known to be safer than water, which often came from polluted sources and caused disease.

== Mayflower ship history ==
There were 26 vessels bearing the name Mayflower in the port books of England during the reign of King James I (1603–1625), although it is unknown why the name was so popular. The identity of captain Christopher Jones's Mayflower is based on records from her home port, her known tonnage (est. 180–200 tons) and the master's name. It is unknown when and where Mayflower was built, although late records designate her as "of London". She was designated in the port books of 1609–11 as "of Harwich" in the county of Essex, coincidentally the birthplace of Jones in about 1570.

Records dating from August 1609 note Jones as master and part owner of Mayflower when the ship was chartered for a voyage from London to Trondheim, Norway and back to London. The ship lost an anchor on her return in bad weather, and she made short delivery of her cargo of herring. Litigation resulted that went unresolved until at least 1612. According to records, the ship was twice on the Thames at London in 1613, once in July and again in October and November, and in 1616 she was on the Thames carrying a cargo of wine, which suggests that the ship had recently been on a voyage to France, Spain, Portugal, the Canary Islands or some other wine-producing land. Jones sailed Mayflower across the English Channel, taking English woolens to France and bringing French wine back to London. He also transported hats, hemp, Spanish salt, hops and vinegar to Norway, and he may have taken Mayflower whaling in the North Atlantic off Spitsbergen or sailed to Mediterranean ports.

No further records relate to Jones's Mayflower from 1616 until 1624. It is unusual for a ship that traded in and out of London to have disappeared from the records for such a long time. No admiralty court documents have been found that mention the Pilgrims' voyage of 1620. This may be the result of loss of records from the period or the unusual manner in which the transfer of the Pilgrims was arranged from Leyden to New England.

Jones was one of the owners of the ship by 1620, along with Christopher Nichols, Robert Child and Thomas Short. Thomas Weston chartered Mayflower from Child and Short in the summer of 1620 to undertake the Pilgrims' voyage. Weston played a significant role in the Mayflower's voyage, as he was a member of the Company of Merchant Adventurers of London, and he eventually traveled to the Plymouth Colony himself.

=== Later history ===
Three of Mayflower's owners applied to the admiralty court for an appraisal of the ship on 4 May 1624, two years after Captain Jones's death in 1622. Among these applicants was Jones's widow Josian Jones. This appraisal was most likely conducted to determine the ship's value in an effort to settle the captain's estate. The appraisal was conducted by four mariners and shipwrights of Rotherhithe, London (the home and burial place of Captain Jones), where Mayflower was stationed in the Thames. The appraisal documents have been preserved and provide information on the ship's gear and equipment, such as muskets and other arms. The ship may have been confined to port following Jones's death and allowed to avoid repair, as the appraisal indicates. The vessel was valued at 128 pounds, eight shillings and fourpence.

Mayflower's final disposition is an unsettled issue. Charles Edward Banks, an English historian of the ship, claims that she was disassembled. Historical records indicate that in 1624, Thomas Russell of Jordans, a village in Buckinghamshire erected a barn with timbers purchased from a shipbreaker's yard in Rotherhithe, which many believe to have been those of the Mayflower. The structure still exists as the Mayflower Barn, located within the grounds of Old Jordan in South Buckinghamshire. The well-preserved barn became a tourist attraction, receiving visitors from around the world, but it later became privately owned and was closed to the public.

=== Second Mayflower ===
Another ship called Mayflower voyaged from London to Plymouth Colony in May 1629, arriving in August with 35 passengers aboard, many of whom were from the Pilgrim congregation in Leiden that organized the first voyage. This ship also traveled from England to America in 1630 (as part of the Winthrop Fleet), 1633, 1634 and 1639. It attempted the trip again in October 1641, with 140 passengers bound for Virginia, but it was lost at sea.

== Mayflower design and layout ==
Mayflower was square-rigged with a beakhead bow and high, castle-like structures fore and aft that protected the crew and the main deck from the elements. This design was typical of English merchant ships of the early 17th century. Her stern carried a 30-foot-high (9 m), square aft-castle that posed difficulties for the ship to sail close to the wind and was ill-suited for the North Atlantic's prevailing westerlies, especially in the fall and winter of 1620. As a result, the voyage from England to America took more than two months. Mayflower's return trip to London in April–May 1621 took less than half that time, with the same strong winds now blowing in the direction of the voyage.

Mayflower's exact dimensions are unknown, but she probably measured about 100 feet (30 m) from the beak of her prow to the tip of her stern superstructure, about 25 feet (7.6 m) at her widest point with the bottom of her keel about 12 feet (3.7 m) below the waterline. William Bradford estimated that she had a cargo capacity of 180 tons, and surviving records indicate that she could carry 180 casks holding hundreds of gallons each. The general layout of the ship was as follows:

- Three masts: mizzen (aft), main (midship) and fore, and also a spritsail in the bow area
- Three primary levels: main deck, gun deck and cargo hold

Captain Christopher Jones's cabin was located aft on the main deck in the stern and measured approximately about ten by seven feet (3 by 2 m). Forward of that was the steerage room, which probably housed berths for the ship's officers and contained the ship's compass and whipstaff (tiller extension) for sailing control. Forward of the steerage room was the capstan, a vertical axle used to control ropes or cables. Far forward on the main deck, just aft of the bow, was the forecastle space where the ship's cook prepared meals for the crew. The sailors may have also slept in the forecastle.

The poop deck was located on the ship's highest level above the stern on the aft castle and above Jones's cabin. On this deck stood the poop house, which was ordinarily a chart room or a cabin for the master's mates on most merchant ships, but it might have been used by the passengers on Mayflower for sleeping or cargo.

The passengers resided in the gun deck during the voyage, a space measuring about 50 by 25 feet (15 m × 7.6 m) with a five-foot (1.5 m) ceiling. It was a dangerous place if there was conflict, as it had gun ports from which cannon could be deployed to fire upon enemies. The gun room was in the stern area of the deck, although passengers had no access to the storage space for gunpowder and ammunition. The gun room may have also housed a pair of stern chasers, small cannon used to fire from the ship's stern. Forward on the gun deck in the bow area was a windlass, similar in function to that of the steerage capstan, which was used to raise and lower the ship's main anchor. There were no stairs for the passengers on the gun deck to ascend through the gratings to the main deck; the passengers could only reach the deck by climbing a wooden or rope ladder.

Below the gun deck was the cargo hold, where the passengers kept most of their food stores and other supplies, including most of their clothing and bedding. It stored the passengers' personal weapons and military equipment, such as armor, muskets, gunpowder, shot, swords and bandoliers. It also stored tools and equipment required to build settlements and prepare meals in the New World. Some Pilgrims, including Isaac Allerton and William Mullins, traded goods aboard the ship that were most likely were stored in the cargo hold. There was no toilet on Mayflower, and passengers and crew were thus forced to devise their own accommodations. Gun-deck passengers most likely employed buckets as chamber pots, fixed to the deck or bulkhead to steady them while at sea.

Mayflower was heavily armed; her largest gun was a brass minion cannon that weighed approximately 1,200 pounds (540 kg) and could shoot a 3.5-pound (1.6 kg) cannonball almost one mile (1,600 m). She also had a saker cannon of about 800 pounds (360 kg) and two base cannons that weighed about 200 pounds (91 kg) and shot a three-to-five-ounce ball (85–140 g). She carried at least ten pieces of ordnance on the port and starboard sides of her gun deck: seven cannons for long-range purposes and three smaller guns often fired from the stern at close quarters that were filled with musket balls. Jones unloaded four of the pieces to fortify Plymouth Colony.

== Mayflower officers, crew, and others ==
According to author Charles Banks, the officers and crew of Mayflower consisted of a captain, four mates, four quartermasters, surgeon, carpenter, cooper, cooks, boatswains, gunners and about 36 men before the mast, a crew of approximately 50. The entire crew stayed with Mayflower in Plymouth through the winter of 1620–1621, and about half of them died during that time. The remaining crewmen returned to England on Mayflower, which sailed for London on April 15 [O.S. April 5], 1621.

== Legacy ==
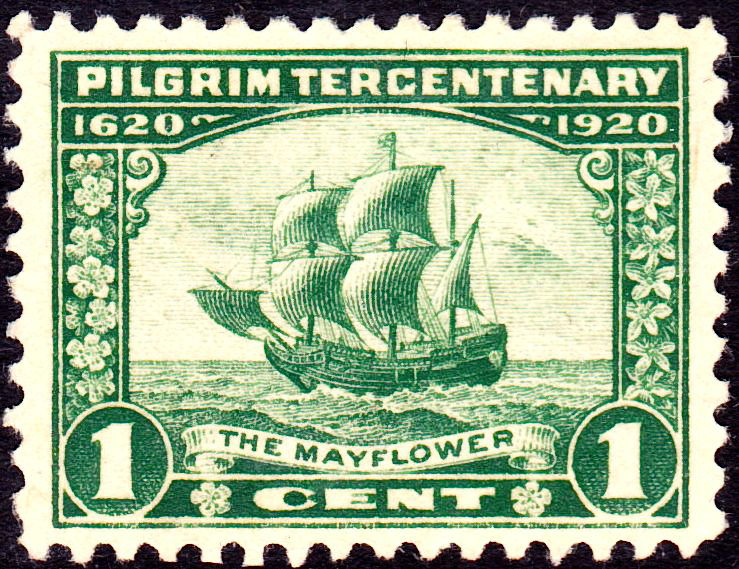
Mayflower Tercentenary stamp, 1920 issue

Mayflower has a famous place in American history as a symbol of early European colonization of the future United States. As described by Richard Bevan:

Out of all the voyages to the American colonies from 1620 to 1640, the Mayflower's first crossing of Pilgrim Fathers has become the most culturally iconic and important in the history of migration from Europe to the New World during the Age of Discovery.

The main record for the voyage of Mayflower and the disposition of the Plymouth Colony is based on the letters and journal of William Bradford, who was a guiding force and later the governor of the colony. His detailed record of the journey is one of the primary sources used by historians and the most complete history of Plymouth Colony written by a Mayflower passenger.

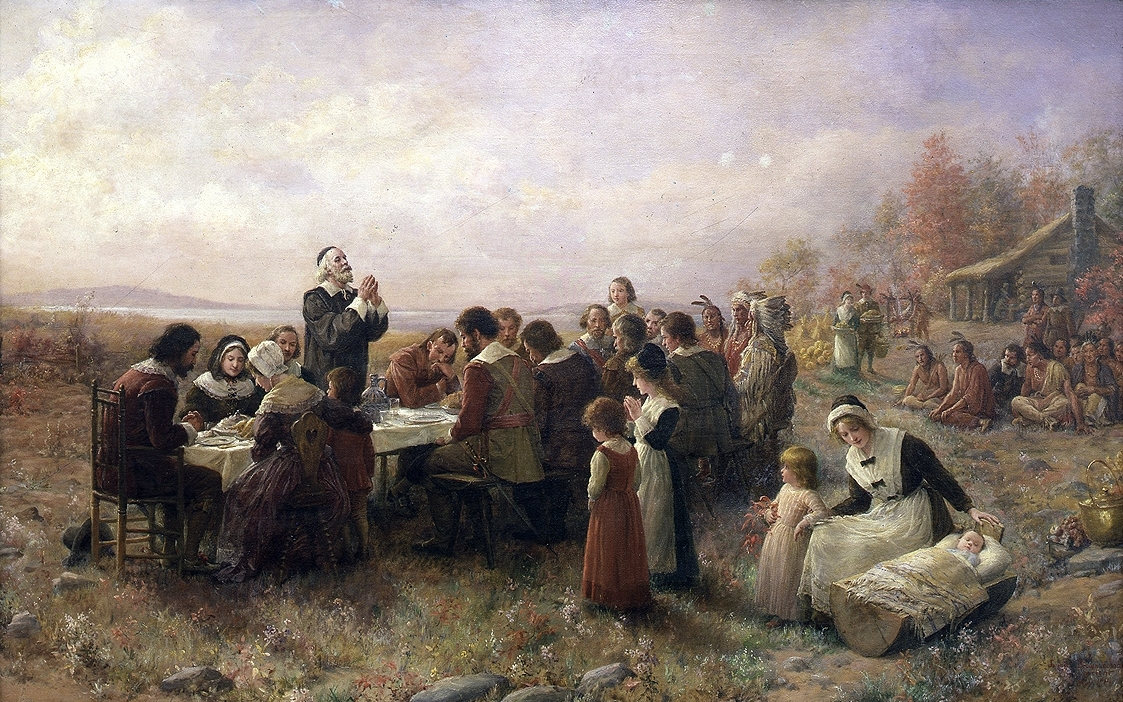
The First Thanksgiving at Plymouth (1914) By Jennie A. Brownscombe

The American national holiday of Thanksgiving originated from the first Thanksgiving feast held by the Pilgrims in 1621, a prayer event and dinner to mark the first harvest of the Mayflower settlers.

The 300th anniversary of Mayflower's landing was commemorated in 1920 and early 1921 by celebrations throughout the United States and Europe, with delegations from England, Holland and Canada meeting in New York. The city's mayor John Francis Hylan delivered a speech in which he asserted that the principles of the Pilgrims' Mayflower Compact were precursors to the United States Declaration of Independence. Massachusetts governor Calvin Coolidge commemorated the compact as an event of great importance in American history:

It was the foundation of liberty based on law and order, and that tradition has been steadily upheld. They drew up a form of government which has been designated as the first real constitution of modern times. It was democratic, an acknowledgment of liberty under law and order and the giving to each person the right to participate in the government, while they promised to be obedient to the laws....[A]ny form of government is better than anarchy, and any attempt to tear down government is an attempt to wreck civilization.

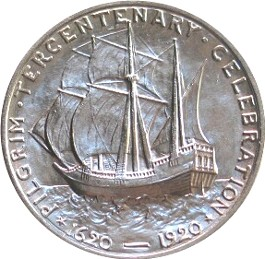
Mayflower, reverse of the Pilgrim Tercentenary half dollar, 1920–21

With 20 Mayflower historical societies throughout the country, the celebration was expected to last throughout 1920. A world's fair to commemorate the anniversary had been planned years earlier but was canceled in the aftermath of World War I.

The US Mint issued a Pilgrim Tercentenary half dollar that portrays the ship on its reverse and Bradford on its obverse.

=== 400th anniversary, 2020 ===
For the 400th anniversary of Mayflower's landing in 2020, numerous organizations planned celebrations to mark the voyage, and festivities celebrating the anniversary took place in various New England locations. Celebrations were also planned in England and the Netherlands, where the Pilgrims had resided in exile preceding their voyage, but the COVID-19 pandemic forced the cancellation of some commemorative celebrations.

To mark the anniversary, an unmanned Mayflower autonomous ship crossed the Atlantic Ocean, navigated by an AI captain designed by IBM. The Harwich Mayflower Heritage Centre hoped to build a replica of the ship at Harwich, England. Some descendants of the Pilgrims sought a "once-in-a-lifetime" experience to commemorate their ancestors.

In a charity event, a full-scale replica of Mayflower was burned in Great Torrington in Devon, England on 28 August 2021, a year later than originally planned.

According to the General Society of Mayflower Descendants, there are "35 million Mayflower descendants in the world".

=== Use of "Mayflower" ===
The SS Ruslan, a ship of the Third Aliyah from Odessa that docked in Jaffa in 1919 and has been described as the "Israeli Mayflower" for its cultural importance in the development of Israeli culture since on board of the Ruslan were several pioneers of Israeli culture.

The phrase "return of the Mayflower" is often used to refer to significant events involving Americans returning by ship to England. George Henry Boughton used this phrase for his 1871 painting, as did Bernard F. Gribble, the latter of which depicts US Navy destroyers entering British waters as the United States joined the allied forces in World War I.

== See also ==
- Billericay, where the Pilgrim Fathers met before the voyage
- Mayflower II, a replica of Mayflower in Plymouth, Massachusetts
- Mayflower Steps in Plymouth, site of the ship's final departure from England
- Mayflower: The Pilgrims' Adventure (1979)
- Pilgrims (Plymouth Colony)
- Plymouth Adventure (directed by Clarence Brown, 1952)
- Puritan migration to New England (1620–1640)
- Seaflower, sister ship to Mayflower
- Speedwell (1577 ship)
