= Gunpowder Plot (disambiguation) =

The Gunpowder Plot of 1605 was a failed assassination attempt against King James I of England and VI of Scotland.

Gunpowder Plot may also refer to:

- The Gunpowder Plot: Exploding the Legend, a 2005 a British TV show
- The Gunpowder Plot: Terror and Faith in 1605, a 1996 book by Antonia Fraser
- Gunpowder Plot in popular culture

== See also ==
- Gunpowder (disambiguation)
- Gunpowder (TV series), a 2017 British TV series based on the Gunpowder Plot
- Gunpowder Incident, a 1775 conflict in the American Revolutionary War
- Gunpowder, Treason & Plot, a 2004 British TV series about the Gunpowder Plot
