= Évelyne Lever =

French historian and writer

Évelyne Lever (known simply in English as Evelyne Lever) is a contemporary French historian and writer. She was married to a French historian, Maurice Lever, who is the author of Sade.

Lever was previously a research engineer at CNRS, and then began to focus more on 18th-century history. In particular, she focuses on certain people, including Louis XVI, Marie Antoinette and Madame de Pompadour.

Marie Antoinette: The Last Queen of France was her first book to be published in the United States. It is less extensive than Lever's French version (Marie-Antoinette : la dernière reine), and was written specifically for an American audience. The book was originally planned to be the basis of Sofia Coppola's 2006 film Marie Antoinette, before her final decision of using Antonia Fraser's Marie Antoinette: The Journey instead.

She continues to write on and about 18th-century history.

== Publications ==
French

- 1792, les procès de Louis XVI et de Marie-Antoinette, Complexe
- Louis XVIII, Fayard, 1988
- Louis XVI, Fayard, 1991
- Mémoires du baron de Breteuil, édition critique, Paris, François Bourin, 1992
- Marie-Antoinette : La dernière reine, collection « Découvertes Gallimard » (nº 402). Paris: Éditions Gallimard, 2000
- Madame de Pompadour: A Life, (with) Catherine Temerson, trad. by Catherine Temerson, St. Martin's Press, 2003
- L'Affaire du Collier, Fayard, 2004
- Les dernières noces de la monarchie. Louis XVI et Marie-Antoinette, Fayard, 2005
- Lettres intimes (1778–1782) : Que je suis heureuse d'être ta femme, (written by) Marquis de Bombelles and Marquise de Bombelles, prefaced by Évelyne Lever, Tallandier, 2005
- C'était Marie-Antoinette, Fayard, 2006
- Marie-Antoinette, correspondance (1770–1793), edition established and presented by Évelyne Lever
- Marie-Antoinette : Journal d'une reine, Tallandier, coll. "Texto", 2008
- Le Chevalier d’Eon : " Une vie sans queue ni tête " , with Maurice Lever, Fayard, 2009

English

- Marie Antoinette: The Last Queen of France, New York: Farrar Straus Giroux, 2000
