= Edward Fitzgerald (barrister) =

British barrister

Edward Hamilton Fitzgerald KC
- Born: 1953 (age 72–73)
- Education: Downside School. BA, University of Oxford; MPhil, University of Cambridge
- Occupation: Barrister
- Spouse: Rebecca Fraser
- Children: 3 daughters

Edward Hamilton Fitzgerald CBE KC (born 1953) is a British barrister who specialises in criminal law, public law, and international human rights law. His work against the death penalty has led him to represent criminals such as: Myra Hindley, Mary Bell, Maxine Carr, various IRA prisoners, and Abu Hamza. Fitzgerald is currently the joint head of Doughty Street Chambers.

== Early life and education ==
Fitzgerald was educated at Ladycross Preparatory School in Seaford, and then Downside School in Stratton-on-the-Fosse, Somerset, England, where he joined Barlow House. He enjoyed debate and was encouraged to help those less fortunate, including prisoners. Fitzgerald went on to study at Corpus Christi College, Oxford where he read Literae Humaniores (Classics), and graduated with a Congratulatory First. At Oxford, Fitzgerald played rugby for Corpus Christi, became involved in College politics, was elected secretary of the Junior Common Room, spoke regularly at the Oxford Union, wrote for the university paper, and edited the college magazine.

After finishing his degree, Fitzgerald signed up to the two-year Bar course and then took a year off. He volunteered as a drama teacher at Kingswood reformatory, Bristol, for six months. This inspired him to work further with prisoners. Around this time, he worked for Mind. Following this, he resumed his legal career with a one-year pupillage and he studied at the University of Cambridge leaving with a Master of Philosophy degree.

== Career at the Bar ==
Fitzgerald was called to the Bar in 1978 and took silk in 1995. At the age of 27, Fitzgerald was a barrister practising at Dr Johnson's Buildings, Temple, London, which included Helena Kennedy, and Geoffrey Robertson. Fitzgerald has appeared in many leading cases involving extradition, appeals over miscarriages of justice, and Privy Council death row appeals from the Commonwealth and Caribbean. In successive landmark cases in the House of Lords and European Court of Human Rights he has established rights for life-sentence prisoners and those on death row. Fitzgerald has been called to the Bar in a number of Commonwealth jurisdictions, which allowed him to represent death row prisoners in the Caribbean at all levels: sentencing hearings in the local courts, in the Courts of Appeal of Belize and the Eastern Caribbean, and at the Privy Council.

His criminal defence work has led him to represent "some of the most loathed people ever to appear in court." His clients have included Myra Hindley, the Moors murderer; Mary Bell, a child killer; Maxine Carr; Jon Venables, one of James Bulger's killers various IRA prisoners, including Róisín McAliskey; and Abu Hamza, a controversial Muslim cleric. Fitzgerald also represented David Shayler, a British journalist and former MI5 (Security Service) officer. In February 2020, Fitzgerald represented Julian Assange at the Westminster Magistrates' Court in London during hearings about Assange's extradition to the United States in which Fitzgerald asserted that Dana Rohrabacher as an emissary of President Donald Trump had offered Assange a pardon from Trump if Assange could show that Russians had not obtained and leaked United States Democratic party emails in 2016 but, instead, Seth Rich had been the source of the leaks.

== Personal life ==
Fitzgerald is married to Rebecca Fraser, a daughter of the historian Lady Antonia Fraser and Conservative MP Sir Hugh Fraser. The couple have three daughters.

== Awards and honours ==
He has been recognised as a leading silk in Public and Administrative, criminal and criminal extradition law, and received a star ranking for his work in Civil liberties in the United Kingdom. In June 1998, Fitzgerald was awarded the Justice award, sponsored by The Times, for outstanding contributions to criminal justice. Fitzgerald is also the ninth most cited barrister in the UK press, with 70 mentions between July 2006 and 2007. On 25 September 2005, Fitzgerald became the "Human Rights Silk of the Year" at the Chambers and Partners Bar Awards. In June 2008, Fitzgerald was made a Commander of the Order of the British Empire in the Queen's Birthday Honours list 2008. The award was made in recognition of his services to human rights. In 2009, Fitzgerald won the silver jubilee "Legal Aid Lawyer of the Year" (for outstanding achievement) from the Legal Aid Practitioner's Group.

== Trusteeships and patronages ==
Fitzgerald has been a trustee of the Death Penalty Project since its inception in 2005. Fitzgerald is also a patron of the Human Rights Lawyers Association. Fitzgerald is a trustee of The Longford Trust, founded in 2002 by admirers of Lord Longford (1905–2001) to celebrate his achievements and to further his goals in social and prison reform. Fitzgerald is also a patron of Young Legal Aid Lawyers.
