= Surrender of the German Fleet to the Grand Fleet at Scapa Flow =

1918 painting by Bernard F. Gribble

Surrender of the German Fleet to the Grand Fleet at Scapa Flow with Admiral Sims and Rodman on the U.S. Flagship "New York"
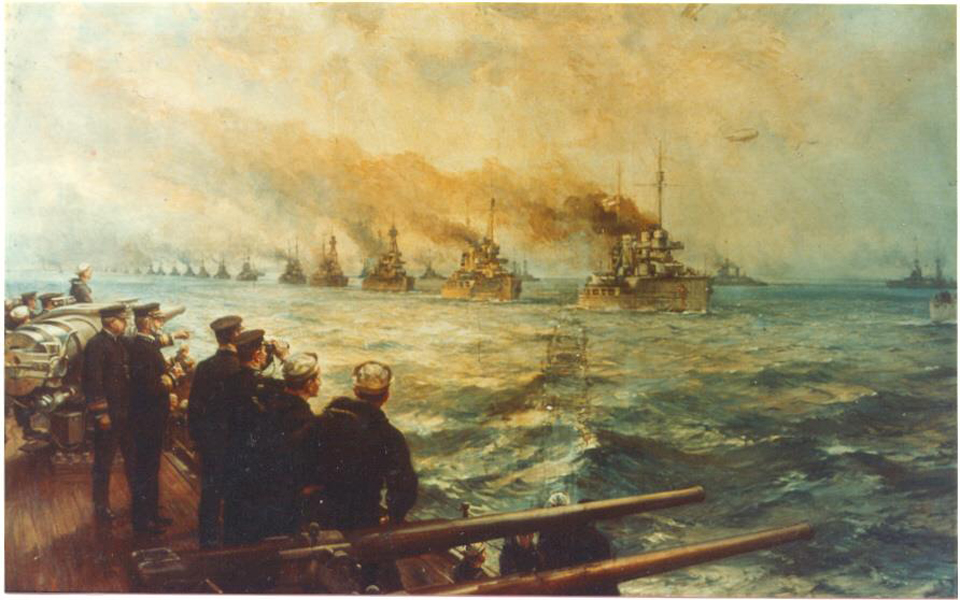
- Artist: Bernard F. Gribble
- Year: 1919
- Type: oil on canvas
- Dimensions: 150 cm × 210 cm (60 in × 84 in)
- Location: U.S. Naval Academy Museum (original) Franklin D. Roosevelt Presidential Library and Museum (second original)

Surrender of the German Fleet to the Grand Fleet at Scapa Flow with Admiral Sims and Rodman on the U.S. Flagship "New York", also referred to as Surrender of the German Fleet to the Grand Fleet at Scapa Flow and Surrender of the German Fleet, is a 1919 oil on canvas painting by British artist Bernard F. Gribble that portrays the Imperial German Navy's surrendering of their High Seas Fleet to the Allies after World War I. The painting is a companion piece to Return of the Mayflower.

== Subject ==
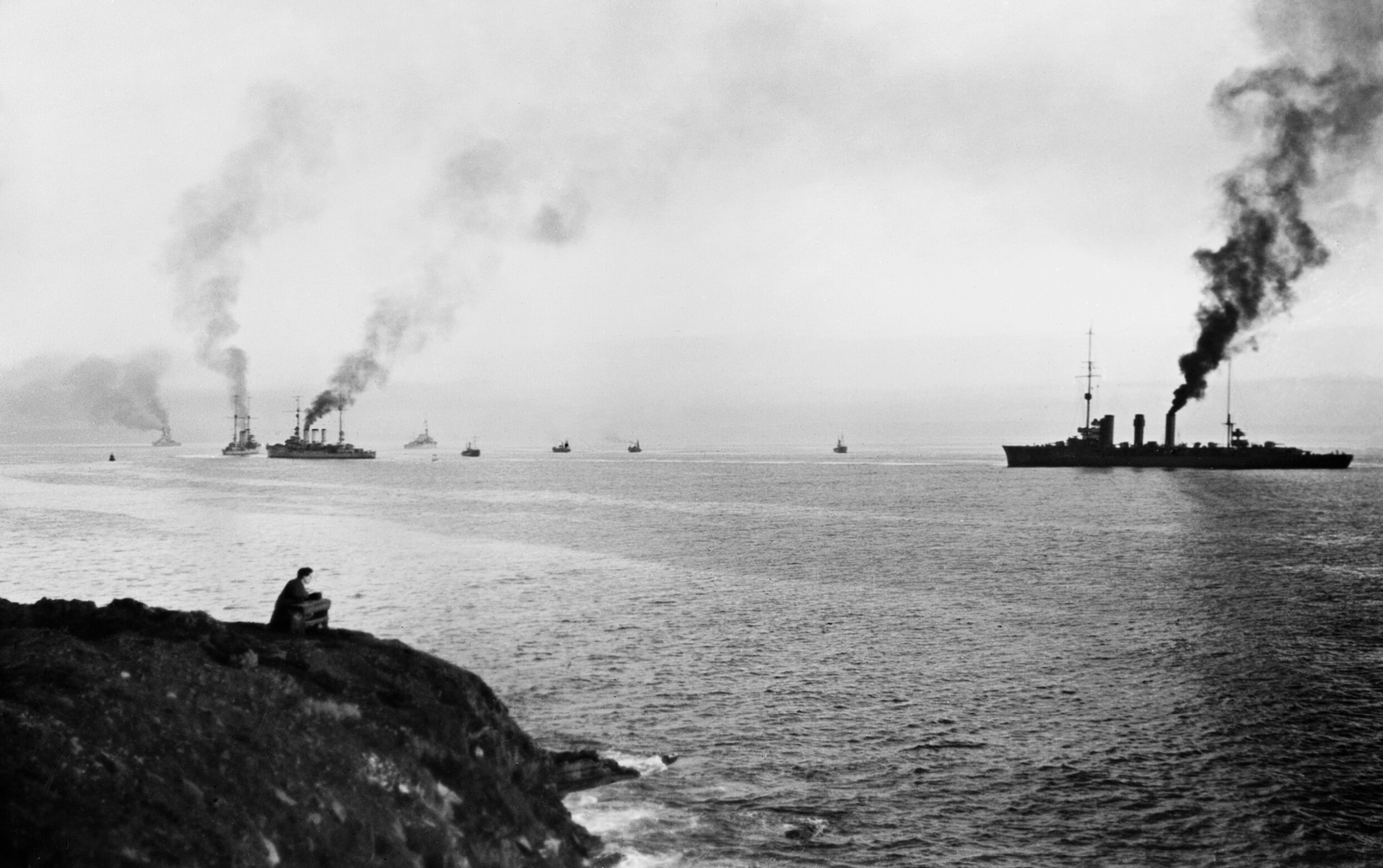
Photograph of the High Seas Fleet entering Scapa Flow

Surrender of the German Fleet commemorates the surrender of the Imperial German Navy's High Seas Fleet to the Allies at the British Naval base in Scapa Flow on 21 November 1918, after the end of World War I. It depicts a group of naval officers and sailors standing on the deck of USS New York, watching the arrival of a line of German battleships, the line receding into the horizon above a rolling sea and below a smoke-filled sky. Airships and a biplane fly above.

== About the painting ==
Surrender of the German Fleet was painted by Bernard F. Gribble, Shipwrights Company's official maritime painter and one of the few civilians in attendance at the event being depicted. The original painting was a 5-by-7-foot (1.5 m × 2.1 m) oil on canvas painting painted in 1919, while a smaller version was later painted for Franklin Delano Roosevelt's personal collection at his request.

Gribble also painted a companion to this piece, Return of the Mayflower, both in the original size and smaller version for Roosevelt. This piece depicts the arrival of United States Navy destroyers to British waters on 4 May 1917.

Surrender of the German Fleet was first displayed at Franklin D. Roosevelt's office at the United States Department of the Navy, and it and its companion are now on display at the U.S. Naval Academy Museum in Annapolis, Maryland.

The smaller Surrender of the German Fleet and its companion were both painted for Franklin Delano Roosevelt, then an assistant secretary in the US Navy. According to a January 1921 correspondence between Roosevelt and Gribble, Roosevelt first displayed these paintings at his home in Hyde Park, New York.

In 1933, Roosevelt loaned these and other paintings to the Corcoran Gallery of Art in Washington D.C. After their exhibition, these paintings were moved to the Oval Office, where they can be seen in many photographs. This painting in particular can also be seen in Roosevelt's family portrait painted by John C. Johansen in 1934. In 1942, Roosevelt moved both paintings back to his home, where they remained until his death three years later.

After Roosevelt's death, his son John Aspinwall Roosevelt removed the paintings from the home. Eleanor Roosevelt owned them until her death in 1962, at which point her heirlooms were divided amongst family members, these paintings going to "an anonymous New York collector" that was later revealed to be John.

In 2001, John's widow auctioned this painting, its companion, and numerous other works to the National Park Service and the National Archives for $300,000 ($545,480 in 2025). The Park Service then placed this painting in Roosevelt's study at the Franklin D. Roosevelt Presidential Library and Museum, while its companion was returned to Roosevelt's home, where it was placed in the same location Roosevelt displayed it during his final years.

== In other mediums ==
Surrender of the German Fleet was considered for a seventeen cent postage stamp in the 1930s US Army and Navy commemorative series.
