= Marie Antoinette (2006 film) =

2006 film by Sofia Coppola

- Theatrical release poster
- Directed by: Sofia Coppola
- Written by: Sofia Coppola
- Based on: Marie Antoinette: The Journey by Antonia Fraser
- Produced by: Ross Katz; Sofia Coppola
- Starring: Kirsten Dunst; Jason Schwartzman; Judy Davis; Rip Torn; Rose Byrne; Asia Argento; Molly Shannon; Shirley Henderson; Danny Huston; Steve Coogan
- Cinematography: Lance Acord
- Edited by: Sarah Flack
- Music by: Dustin O'Halloran
- Production companies: Columbia Pictures; American Zoetrope; Tohokushinsha Film Corporation
- Distributed by: Sony Pictures Releasing (international); Pathé Distribution (France); Toho-Towa (Japan)
- Release dates: May 24, 2006 (Cannes); October 20, 2006 (United States); January 20, 2007 (Japan)
- Running time: 123 minutes
- Countries: France; United States; Japan
- Language: English
- Budget: $40 million
- Box office: $60.9 million

Marie Antoinette is a 2006 historical drama film written, co-produced, and directed by Sofia Coppola. Based on the 2001 biography Marie Antoinette: The Journey by Antonia Fraser, the film covers the life of Marie Antoinette, in the years leading to the French Revolution. The film stars Kirsten Dunst as Marie Antoinette, alongside an ensemble cast, which includes Jason Schwartzman, Judy Davis, Rip Torn, Rose Byrne, Asia Argento, Molly Shannon, Shirley Henderson, Danny Huston, Steve Coogan, and Jamie Dornan in his film debut.

Marie Antoinette premiered at the 2006 Cannes Film Festival, where it competed for the Palme d'Or and was theatrically released in North America on October 20, 2006, by Sony Pictures Releasing. The film received polarized reviews from critics, and did moderately well at box office, grossing approximately $60.9 million against its $40 million budget. Marie Antoinette won Best Costume Design at the 79th Academy Awards.

== Plot ==
Fourteen-year-old Archduchess Marie Antoinette is the daughter and youngest child of Holy Roman Empress Maria Theresa of Austria. In 1770, she travels to France to marry Louis-Auguste, the Dauphin of France, sealing an alliance between Austria and France.

Upon arriving, she relinquishes her Austrian connections, meets King Louis XV and the Dauphin, and weds at the Palace of Versailles. The couple faces pressure to produce an heir as soon as possible, but the next day it is reported to the king that "nothing happened" on the wedding night.

As time passes, Marie Antoinette struggles with the strict protocol of the French court and the hostility of courtiers who view her as a foreigner and criticize the lack of an heir. Resisting court etiquette, she befriends the Princess de Lamballe and the Duchess of Polignac, and she refuses to interact with Louis XV's mistress, Madame du Barry. In correspondence, Maria Theresa regularly advises her daughter on how to consummate the marriage, but the couple remains childless as the Dauphin shows little interest in intimacy. In response to her isolation, Marie Antoinette occupies herself with gambling and purchasing lavish clothing.

After a masquerade ball, Marie Antoinette and Louis-Auguste return to find the king dying of smallpox; before his death, the king banishes Madame du Barry from Versailles. After the king's death, Louis-Auguste succeeds to the throne as Louis XVI at the age of 19, and Marie Antoinette becomes queen consort at age 18.

Marie Antoinette's brother, Joseph II, Holy Roman Emperor, visits Versailles. While he unsuccessfully urges the Queen to curb her her extravagant socializing and constant parties, he speaks with Louis XVI at the Royal Menagerie, and explains to him the "mechanics" of sexual intercourse in terms of "key-making", as one of the king's favourite hobbies is locksmithing. Shortly thereafter, Louis XVI and Marie Antoinette have sex for the first time, and in 1778, Marie Antoinette gives birth to a daughter, Marie Thérèse.

As the child grows, Marie Antoinette spends much of her time at the Petit Trianon retreat, and begins an affair with Swedish officer Count Axel von Fersen. Meanwhile, France's worsening financial crisis and widespread food shortages lead to growing unrest. The Queen's lavish reputation earns her the moniker "Madame Deficit," despite her later efforts to scale back her spending and focus on family life. Over the following years, she gives birth to two more children: Louis-Joseph and Sophie, who dies a month before her first birthday.

When the French Revolution erupts with the storming of the Bastille, the royal family decides to stay at Versailles rather than flee abroad with the rest of the court. An armed mob eventually converges on the palace, forcing the royal family to relocate to the Tuileries Palace in Paris.

The last image is Marie Antoinette's bedroom at Versailles, destroyed by angry rioters.

== Cast ==
- Kirsten Dunst as Marie Antoinette
- Jason Schwartzman as Louis XVI
- Judy Davis as Anne d'Arpajon, Countess of Noailles
- Steve Coogan as Florimond Claude, Count of Mercy-Argenteau
- Rip Torn as Louis XV
- Rose Byrne as Yolande de Polastron, Duchess of Polignac
- Asia Argento as Madame du Barry
- Molly Shannon as Madame Victoire
- Shirley Henderson as Madame Sophie
- Danny Huston as Joseph II, Holy Roman Emperor
- Marianne Faithfull as Empress Maria Theresa
- Mary Nighy as Marie Thérèse Louise of Savoy, Princesse de Lamballe
- Jamie Dornan as Axel von Fersen
- Al Weaver as Charles, Count of Artois
- Sarah Adler as Maria Theresa, Countess of Artois
- Sebastian Armesto as Louis-Stanislaus, Count of Provence
- Clémentine Poidatz as Marie Joséphine, Countess of Provence
- Céline Sallette as Lady in Waiting
- Aurore Clément as the Louise Marie Adélaïde de Bourbon, Duchess of Orléans
- Guillaume Gallienne as Charles Gravier, Count of Vergennes
- Jean-Christophe Bouvet as Étienne François de Choiseul, Duke of Choiseul
- Tom Hardy as Raumont
- James Lance as Léonard Autié
- Mathieu Amalric as Man at Masked Ball
- Joseph Malerba as Queen's Guard
- André Oumansky as Cardinal de La Roche Aymon

== Production ==
=== Development ===
Marie Antoinette was planned to be an adaptation of Évelyne Lever's Marie Antoinette: The Last Queen of France, a biography she wrote for American readers in 2000. Sofia Coppola bought the rights twice, but in the end she chose Antonia Fraser's biography Marie Antoinette: The Journey instead of Lever's book as the basis for her adaptation. The production was given unprecedented access to the Palace of Versailles. The film takes the same sympathetic view of Antoinette's life as was presented in Fraser's biography. Coppola said the style for shooting was greatly influenced by the films of Stanley Kubrick, Terrence Malick, and Miloš Forman as well as by Ken Russell's Lisztomania.

In several 2006 interviews, Coppola suggests that her highly stylised interpretation was intentionally very modern in order to humanise the historical figures involved. She admitted to taking great artistic liberties with the source material, and said that the film does not focus simply on historical facts – "It is not a lesson of history. It is an interpretation documented, but carried by my desire for covering the subject differently."

=== Filming ===
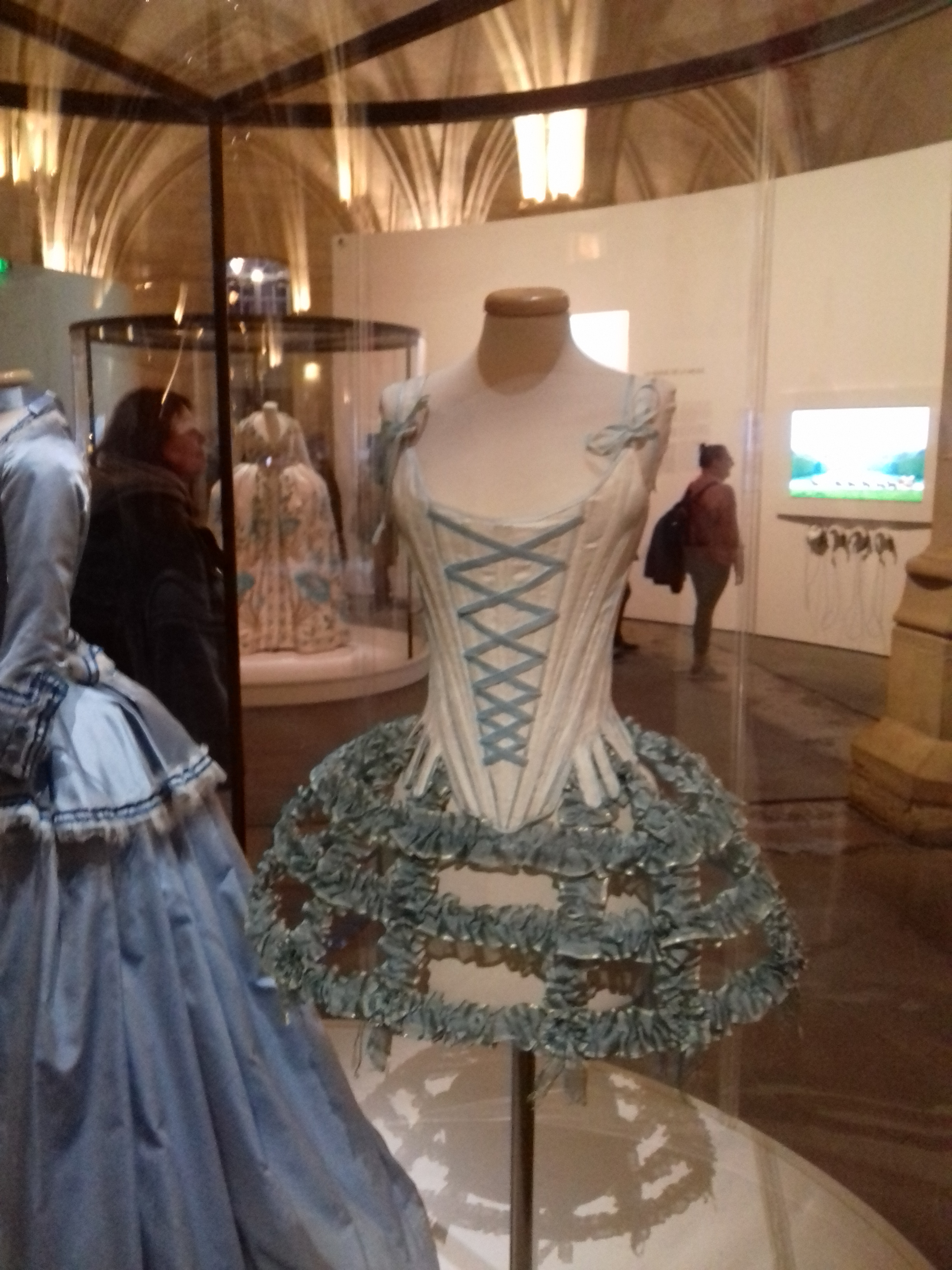
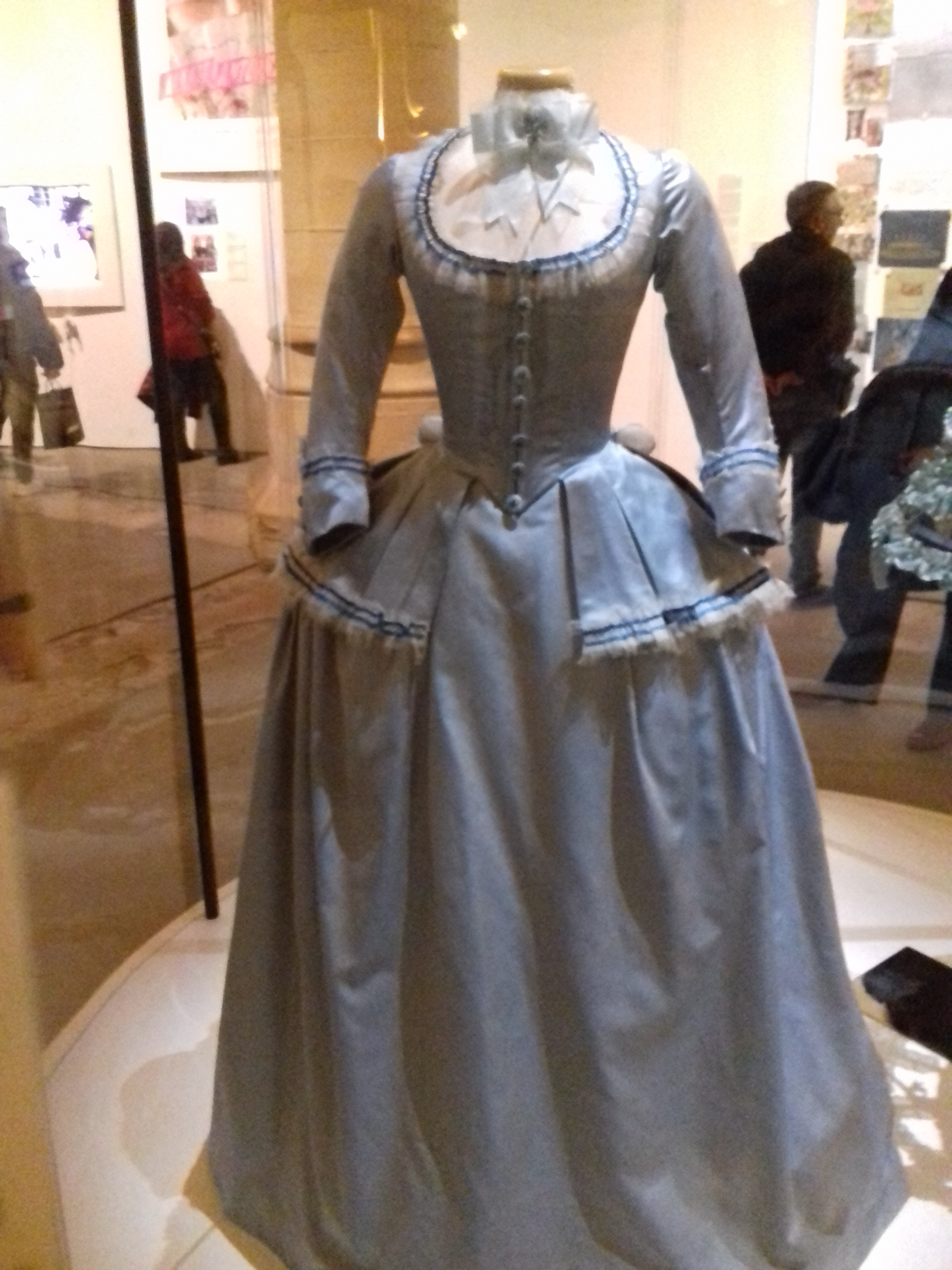
Dunst's costumes, at the exhibition Marie-Antoinette, métamorphoses d’une image in 2019

While the action happens in Versailles (including the Queen's Petit Trianon and the Hameau de la Reine) and the Paris Opera (which was built after the death of the real Marie Antoinette), some scenes were shot in Vaux-le-Vicomte, Château de Chantilly, Hôtel de Soubise and at the Belvedere in Vienna.

Milena Canonero and six assistant designers created the gowns, hats, suits and prop costume pieces. Ten rental houses were employed, and the wardrobe unit had seven transport drivers. Shoes were made by Manolo Blahnik and L.C.P. di Pompei, and hundreds of wigs and hair pieces were made by Rocchetti & Rocchetti. As revealed in the "Making of" documentary on the DVD, the look of Count von Fersen was influenced by 1980s rock singer Adam Ant. Ladurée made the pastries for the film; its macarons are featured in a scene between Marie-Antoinette and Ambassador Mercy.

== Soundtrack ==
The Marie Antoinette soundtrack contains new wave and post-punk bands New Order, Gang of Four, The Cure, Siouxsie and the Banshees, Bow Wow Wow, Adam and the Ants, the Strokes, Dustin O'Halloran and the Radio Dept. Some scenes utilise period music by François Couperin, Antonio Vivaldi, Jean-Philippe Rameau and Domenico Scarlatti. The soundtrack also includes songs by electronic musicians Squarepusher and Aphex Twin.

Roger Neill served as a historic music consultant on the film.

Disc one
No.	Title	Writer(s)	Artist	Length
1.	"Hong Kong Garden" (with strings intro)	Kenny Morris, John McKay, Steven Severin, Siouxsie Sioux	Siouxsie and the Banshees	3:10
2.	"Aphrodisiac"	Matthew Ashman, Dave Barbarossa, Leigh Gorman, Annabella Lwin, Malcolm McLaren	Bow Wow Wow	2:57
3.	"What Ever Happened?"	Julian Casablancas	The Strokes	2:48
4.	"Pulling Our Weight"	Johan Duncanson, Martin Larsson	The Radio Dept.	3:21
5.	"Ceremony"	Ian Curtis, Peter Hook, Stephen Morris, Bernard Sumner	New Order	4:22
6.	"Natural's Not in It"	Hugo Burnham, Andrew Gill, Jon King	Gang of Four	3:06
7.	"I Want Candy" (Kevin Shields remix)	Bert Berns, Bob Feldman, Jerry Goldstein /Richard Gottehrer	Bow Wow Wow	2:39
8.	"Kings of the Wild Frontier"	Adam Ant, Marco Pirroni	Adam and the Ants	3:56
9.	"Concerto in G" (from "Concerto for Strings and Continuo in G major" RV 151 Concerto alla rustica: I presto)	Antonio Vivaldi	Roger Neill	2:31
10.	"The Melody of a Fallen Tree"	Dan Matz, Jason McNeely	Windsor for the Derby	8:16
11.	"I Don't Like It Like This"	Johan Duncanson	The Radio Dept.	4:08
12.	"Plainsong"	Robert Smith, Simon Gallup, Roger O'Donnell, Laurence Tolhurst, Boris Williams	The Cure	5:08

Disc two
No.	Title	Writer(s)	Artist	Length
1.	"Intro Versailles"			0:37
2.	"Jynweythek Ylow"	Aphex Twin	Aphex Twin	2:35
3.	"Opus 17"	Dustin O'Halloran	Dustin O'Halloran	2:03
4.	"Il Secondo Giorno" (instrumental)	Jean-Benoît Dunckel, Nicolas Godin	Air	4:57
5.	"Keen On Boys"	Johan Duncanson, Martin Larsson	The Radio Dept.	4:49
6.	"Opus 23"	Dustin O'Halloran	Dustin O'Halloran	3:08
7.	"Les barricades mystérieuses"	François Couperin	Patricia Mabee	2:35
8.	"Fools Rush In" (Kevin Shields remix)	Rube Bloom, Johnny Mercer	Bow Wow Wow	2:19
9.	"Avril 14th"	Aphex Twin	Aphex Twin	1:58
10.	"K. 213"	Domenico Scarlatti	Patricia Mabee	4:22
11.	"Tommib Help Buss"	Tom Jenkinson	Squarepusher	2:10
12.	"Tristes apprêts, pâles flambeaux" (from Castor et Pollux RCT 32, Act I, Scene III: Air de Télaïre)	Jean Philippe Rameau	Agnès Mellon, William Christie and Les Arts Florissants	5:54
13.	"Opus 36"	Dustin O'Halloran	Dustin O'Halloran	1:45
14.	"All Cats Are Grey"	Robert Smith, Simon Gallup, Laurence Tolhurst	The Cure	5:23

== Release ==
Marie Antoinette premiered on May 24, 2006 at the Cannes Film Festival. Sony Pictures Releasing released the film in the United States on October 20, 2006.

=== Home media ===
The Region 1 and Region 2 DVD versions of Marie Antoinette were released in February 2007. Special features on the disc included a making-of featurette, two deleted scenes and a brief parody segment of MTV Cribs, featuring Jason Schwartzman as Louis XVI. No commentary was available for the DVD. In France, the double-disc edition included additional special features: Sofia Coppola's first short film, Lick the Star, and a BBC documentary on Marie Antoinette. A collector's edition boxset, entitled "Coffret Royal", was also released in France, and included the double-disc edition of the movie, Antonia Fraser's biography, photographs and a fan. The Japanese edition was released on July 19. This two-disc edition included the same extra features as the North American release, though it also included the American, European and Japanese theatrical trailers and Japanese TV spots. A limited-edition special Japanese boxed set contained the two disc DVD set, a jewellery box, a Swarovski high-heeled shoe brooch, a hand mirror, and a lace handkerchief.

Pathe Films released a Blu-ray version of Marie Antoinette on January 4, 2012, alongside Coppola's first film The Virgin Suicides exclusively in France. It ports over the previously released bonus features along with the previously released short film and documentary from the French DVD. While it is a region-free disc, the English-language track contains forced subtitles and the BBC documentary is not English-friendly.

A manufacture on demand Blu-ray was released through Sony's Choice Collection on October 6, 2016. This release, along with other Choice Collection releases, was strongly criticized for being a BD-R disc, which means it is a burnt disc instead of pressed, these discs are essentially a bootleg and a BD-R is more susceptible to damage and has a much shorter lifespan of about 10 years opposed to a pressed disc lasting for 100 years if properly cared for. Reviews were mixed of the Blu-ray video quality, with High Def Digest stating "Everything carries the unfocused blur of non-HD video".

Another Blu-ray of the film, unlike the first release that was sold online, was physically released by Mill Creek Entertainment on October 29, 2019, as part of a double feature set also containing Kirsten Dunst's fellow Columbia Pictures film Little Women.

A 4K restoration of the film was released on Blu-ray and 4K UHD Blu-ray by The Criterion Collection on November 10, 2026.

== Reception ==
=== Box office ===
In the United States and Canada, Marie Antoinette opened with $5,361,050 from 859 theatres, with an average of $6,241 per theatre. Nevertheless, the film quickly faded, grossing $15,962,471 in North America and $60,917,189 worldwide, against a production budget of $40 million. Marie Antoinette made $7,870,774 in France, where the film is set, but fared less well in the United Kingdom, where it took $1,727,858 at the box office, while the film's biggest international market was Japan, where it earned a total of $15,735,433.

=== Critical response ===
Marie Antoinette received both applause and some boos during early Cannes Film Festival press screenings, which one reviewer supposes was because some of the French journalists may have been offended that the film was not sufficiently critical of the regime's decadence. However, film critic Roger Ebert clarified that, in actuality, only a couple of journalists had been booing during the press screening, and that the media had sensationalised the event. He stated that booing is more common in Europe, and sometimes done when someone feels that a film is "politically incorrect".

Marie Antoinette received polarized reviews from critics. The film holds an approval rating of 58% on Rotten Tomatoes based on 219 reviews with an average rating of 6.3/10. The website's critics consensus states, "Lavish imagery and a daring soundtrack set this film apart from most period dramas; in fact, style completely takes precedence over plot and character development in Coppola's vision of the doomed queen." Metacritic gives the film a weighted average score of 65 out of 100, based on 37 critics, indicating "generally favorable reviews". Audiences polled by CinemaScore gave the film an average grade of "C" on an A+ to F scale.

==== In the United States ====
People magazine's movie critic, Leah Rozen, wrote in her wrap-up of Cannes that, "The absence of political context ... upset most critics of Marie Antoinette, director Sofia Coppola's featherweight follow-up to Lost in Translation. Her historical biopic plays like a pop video, with Kirsten Dunst as the doomed 18th century French queen acting like a teenage flibbertigibbet intent on being the leader of the cool kids' club." Roger Ebert gave the film four stars out of four. He stated that, "every criticism I have read of this film would alter its fragile magic and reduce its romantic and tragic poignancy to the level of an instructional film. This is Sofia Coppola's third film centering on the loneliness of being female and surrounded by a world that knows how to use you but not how to value and understand you." The critic for MSN, Dave McCoy, described it as a great satire, "I laughed, as I had been doing for the past twenty minutes. I was laughing at the satire, at Coppola's brash approach and from the pure joy that a great film can trigger."

In 2025, it was one of the films that received votes in the "Readers' Choice" edition of The New York Times' list of "The 100 Best Movies of the 21st Century," finishing at number 211.

==== In France ====
The film's critical reception in France was generally positive. It has an aggregate score of 4/5 on the French cinema site AlloCiné, based on 21 reviews from professional critics. In the French trade journal, Le Film Francais, a third of the critics gave it their highest rating—"worthy of the Palme d'Or." Film critic Michel Ciment similarly rated it as worthy of the Palme d'Or.

Critics who gave the film positive reviews included Danielle Attali of Le Journal du Dimanche, who praised it as "a true wonder, with stunning colors, sensations, emotions, intelligence". François Vey of Le Parisien found it to be "funny, upbeat, impertinent" and "in a word, iconoclastic". Philippe Paumier of the French edition of Rolling Stone said that, "Transformed into a sanctuary for the senses, the microcosm of power becomes this moving drama of first emotions and Marie Antoinette, the most delicate of looks on adolescence". Frodon, editor of Les Cahiers du cinéma, praised Coppola for her "'genius' at portraying adolescent alienation."

Among negative critical reviews, Jean-Luc Douin of Le Monde described Marie Antoinette as "kitsch and roc(k)oco" which "deliberately displays its anachronisms", and additionally as a "sensory film" that was "dreamt by a Miss California" and "orchestrated around the Du Barry or Madame de Polignac playground gossip". Alex Masson of Score thought the film had a script "which is often forgotten to the corruption of becoming a special issue of Vogue devoted to scenes of Versailles".

French critics were annoyed with the loose portrayal of real historical events and figures in Marie Antoinette. Although it was filmed at Versailles, to capture the splendor of eighteenth-century royal life, some critics took issue with or did not understand why Coppola intermixed period music with contemporary music, for instance, using soundtracks by artists such as the Cure and the Strokes – or why she intermixed modern products, such as Converse sneakers, with formal period shoes. Although one historian explains that while they may be distracting, "they also convey the rebelliousness of a young woman, frustrated, bored, isolated, and yet always on display." An example of this combining of the actual period with modern times is a scene when Marie Antoinette and her friends enjoy a shopping spree and feast on luxurious sweets, champagne, clothing, shoes and jewellery to Bow Wow Wow's "I Want Candy".

In the newspaper Le Figaro, historian Jean Tulard called the film "Versailles in Hollywood sauce", saying that it "dazzles" with a "deployment of wigs, fans and pastries, a symphony of colors" which "all [mask] some gross errors and voluntary anachronisms". In the magazine L'Internaute, Évelyne Lever, a historian and authority on Marie Antoinette, described the film as "far from historical reality". She wrote that the film's characterisation of Marie Antoinette lacked historical authenticity and psychological development: "In reality she did not spend her time eating pastries and drinking champagne! [...] In the movie Marie Antoinette is the same from 15 to 33 years". She also expressed the view that "better historical films" such as Barry Lyndon and The Madness of King George succeeded because their directors were "steeped in the culture of the time they evoked".

Coppola responded to the critics by explaining that she was interested in showing "the real human being behind the myths..."

My goal was to capture in the design the way in which I imagined the essence of Marie Antoinette's spirit...so the film's candy colors, its atmosphere and teenaged music all reflect and are meant to evoke how I saw that world from Marie Antoinette's perspective."

=== Accolades ===
Award	Category	Recipient(s)	Result	Ref.
Academy Awards	Best Costume Design	Milena Canonero	Won	
British Academy Film Awards	Best Costume Design	Milena Canonero	Nominated	
British Academy Film Awards	Best Makeup and Hair	Desiree Corridoni and Jean-Luc Russier	Nominated	
British Academy Film Awards	Best Production Design	K. K. Barrett and Véronique Melery	Nominated	
Cannes Film Festival	Palme d'Or	Sofia Coppola	Nominated	
Cannes Film Festival	National Education Award	Sofia Coppola	Won	
Cannes Film Festival	Palm Dog Award	Mops	Won	
Costume Designers Guild Awards	Excellence in Period Film	Milena Canonero	Nominated	
Critics' Choice Awards	Best Soundtrack	Marie Antoinette	Nominated	
Gotham Independent Film Awards	Best Feature	Sofia Coppola, director; Ross Katz and Sofia Coppola, producers (Sony Pictures)	Nominated	
Las Vegas Film Critics Society Awards	Best Art Direction	Pierre du Boisberranger and Anne Seibel	Won	
Las Vegas Film Critics Society Awards	Best Costume Design	Milena Canonero	Won	
Nastro d'Argento Awards	Best Costume Design	Milena Canonero	Won	
Phoenix Film Critics Society Awards	Best Costume Design	Milena Canonero	Won	
Phoenix Film Critics Society Awards	Best Production Design	K. K. Barrett	Won	
Satellite Awards	Best Art Direction and Production Design	K. K. Barrett	Nominated	
Satellite Awards	Best Costume Design	Milena Canonero	Nominated	
Washington D.C. Area Film Critics Association Awards	Best Art Direction	Anne Seibel	Won	
