= Return of the Mayflower =

1918 painting by Bernard F. Gribble

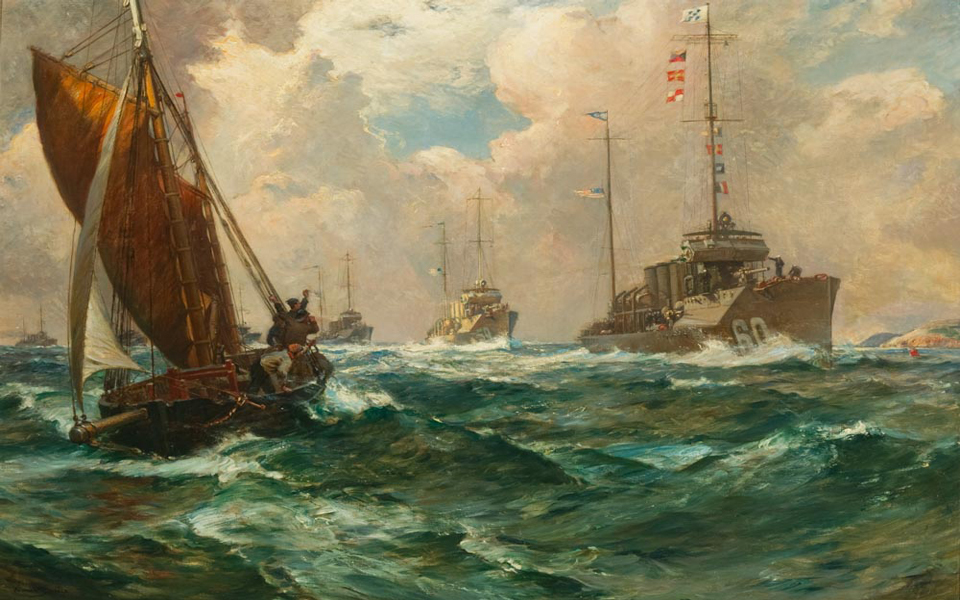
- Artist: Bernard F. Gribble
- Year: 1919
- Type: oil on canvas
- Dimensions: 150 cm × 210 cm (60 in × 84 in)
- Location: U.S. Naval Academy Museum (original) Home of Franklin D. Roosevelt National Historic Site (second original)

Return of the Mayflower, also known as "We Are Ready Now" Return of the Mayflower, is a 1919 oil on canvas painting by British artist Bernard F. Gribble. The painting portrays United States Navy destroyers that had been sent to assist Great Britain during World War I approaching Ireland's Queenstown on 4 May 1917. The name of the work is a reference to the ship that transported the Pilgrims from England to the New World in 1620.

== Historic context ==
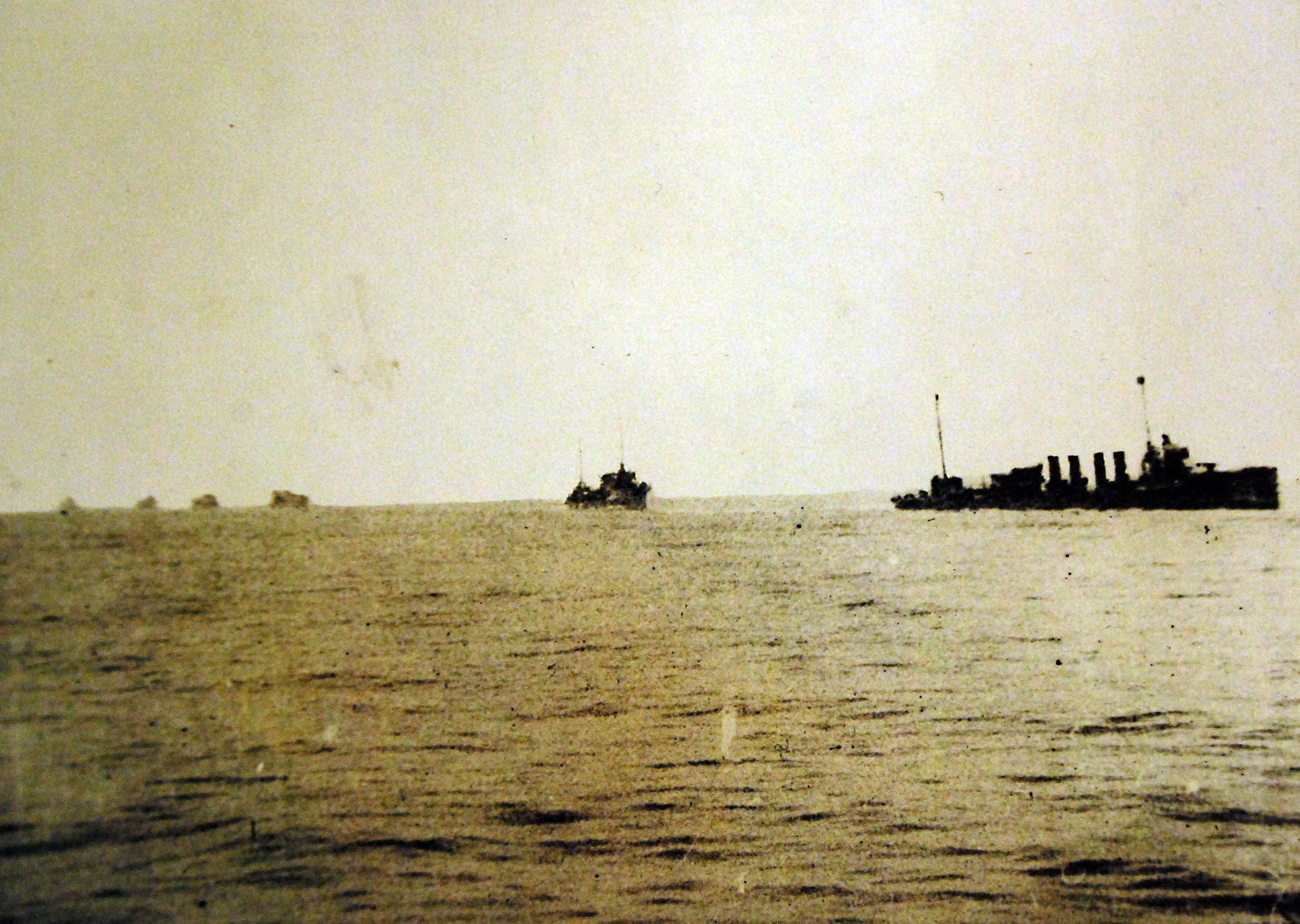
Photograph of US destroyers arriving at Queenstown, Ireland on May 4, 1917

During World War I, the Imperial German Navy adopted a strategy of unrestricted submarine warfare, using U-boats to cut Britain off from maritime imports in an effort to starve the country into defeat. On 6 April 1917, the United States joined the war against Germany. Four days later, Britain's First Sea Lord John Jellicoe, believing that German U-boat attacks were close to defeating Britain, appealed to US Rear Admiral William S. Sims, who sent a message to Washington four days later requesting destroyers to aid the Royal Navy. Three weeks later, a flotilla of six destroyers arrived from the United States to British waters.

== Commissioning, composition, and ownership ==
The original Return of the Mayflower was a 5-by-7-foot (1.5 m × 2.1 m) oil on canvas painting painted in 1919, while a smaller version was later painted for Franklin Delano Roosevelt's personal collection at his request. Both paintings depict the 4 May 1917 arrival of the first United States Navy destroyers (USS Wadsworth, Porter, Davis, Conyngham, McDougal, and Wainwright) to the European war zone for service during World War I. The paintings also depict fisherman welcoming the destroyers from their own boat. Roosevelt paid $105 ($1,950 in 2025) for his painting.

The paintings were meant to commemorate America's entry into World War I on the side of the Allies. They also came to symbolize the successful British and American co-operation throughout the war. Their title, a phrase that existed prior to World War I, references the Mayflower and was suggested by Roosevelt. The paintings are also referred to with the title "We Are Ready Now" Return of the Mayflower, "We are ready now" being Commander Joseph K. Taussig's response when asked how long it would take for the destroyers to deploy after arriving in British waters.

Gribble also painted a companion to this piece, Surrender of the German Fleet to the Grand Fleet at Scapa Flow with Admiral Sims and Rodman on the U.S. Flagship "New York", both in the original size and smaller version for Roosevelt. This piece commemorates the surrender of the German Fleet on 21 November 1918.

The original Return of the Mayflower and its companion are on display at the U.S. Naval Academy Museum in Annapolis, Maryland.

The smaller Return of the Mayflower and its companion were both painted for Franklin Delano Roosevelt, then an assistant secretary in the US Navy, who was said to be entranced when he first saw them. According to a January 1921 correspondence between Roosevelt and Gribble, Roosevelt first displayed the paintings at his home in Hyde Park, New York. He also displayed this painting in the New York Governor's Mansion, presumably when he was governor from 1929 to 1932.

In 1933, Roosevelt loaned these and other paintings to the Corcoran Gallery of Art in Washington D.C. After their exhibition, these paintings were moved to the Oval Office, where they can be seen in many photographs. In 1942, Roosevelt moved both paintings back to his home, where they remained until his death three years later.

After Roosevelt's death, his son John Aspinwall Roosevelt removed the paintings from the home. Eleanor Roosevelt owned them until her death in 1962, at which point her heirlooms were divided amongst family members, with the paintings going to "an anonymous New York collector" that was later revealed to be John.

In 2001, John's widow auctioned Return of the Mayflower, its companion painting, and numerous other works to the National Park Service and the National Archives for $300,000 ($545,480 in 2025). The Park Service then returned Return of the Mayflower to Roosevelt's home, where it was placed in the same location Roosevelt displayed it during his final years. Return of the Mayflower's companion piece was placed on display in Roosevelt's study at the Franklin D. Roosevelt Presidential Library and Museum.

== In popular culture ==
Return of the Mayflower is discussed in Erik Larson's 2015 non-fiction novel Dead Wake, about the sinking of the RMS Lusitania and the American entry into World War I.
