= Mary Queen of Scots (Fraser book) =

Book by Antonia Fraser

- First edition
- Author: Antonia Fraser
- Language: English
- Publisher: Delacorte Press
- Publication date: 1969
- Award: James Tait Black Memorial Prize
- ISBN: 9780297857952
- OCLC: 748455581

Mary Queen of Scots (1969) is a biography of Mary, Queen of Scots, by Antonia Fraser. A 40th-anniversary edition of the book was published in 2009.

As she states in her "Author's Note", Fraser aims to test the truth or falsehood of the many legends on Mary and to set her in the context of the age in which she lived. The portrayal is largely sympathetic. Fraser stresses what she sees as Mary's key virtues but believes that Scotland at the time required an extraordinarily strong ruler to pull the nobles into line.

The book dismantles several myths and popular legends that have sprung up about Mary during and after her lifetime. Fraser recounts the circumstances on the plot to murder Mary's second husband, Henry Stuart, Lord Darnley, in detail. At the Conference of York, Regent James Stewart, 1st Earl of Moray, produced the casket letters, presented as love letters from Mary to her third husband, James Hepburn, 4th Earl of Bothwell, with whom she had allegedly plotted to kill Darnley. After rigorous research, Fraser concludes that they were forgeries, most likely an amalgamation of real letters that Mary wrote and of love letters written to Bothwell by one of his mistresses.

The book had Fraser awarded the 1969 James Tait Black Memorial Prize.

== Sources ==
Fraser, Antonia. Mary Queen of Scots. London: Weidenfeld & Nicolson, 1969. ISBN 0-385-31129-X. Reissued, Phoenix paperback, 2001. ISBN 1-84212-446-3 (10); ISBN 978-1-84212-446-8 (13). 40th anniversary ed., reissued Phoenix (Orion Books) paperback, 2009. ISBN 978-0-7538-2654-6.
