= Cromwell, Our Chief of Men =

Biography of Oliver Cromwell

- Author: Antonia Fraser
- Language: English
- Subject: Oliver Cromwell
- Genre: United Kingdom
- Publication date: 1973
- Publication place: United Kingdom

Cromwell, Our Chief of Men by Antonia Fraser is a biography of Oliver Cromwell.

The title is from a poem praising Cromwell by John Milton, perhaps the most famous and accomplished poet of the English Commonwealth. Fraser's goal is to "rescue" Oliver Cromwell and rehabilitate his reputation as a statesman and leader, while not glossing over his obvious faults. (Published in the U.S.A. as Cromwell: The Lord Protector).

From Fraser's point of view, one of Cromwell's main flaws was his tendency to lose his temper in the heat of battle and this character flaw explains the Massacre at Drogheda (1649) and much of his conduct fighting the Irish during the English Civil War. His other main character fault was to see events as the result of "providence" which led him into self-justification of his sometimes harsh decisions. The decision to kill Charles I happened (according to Cromwell) because it was willed by God. Cromwell saw himself as the instrument of his creator and often delayed making decisions because he was looking for "signs from God" to confirm his decisions.

Cromwell's character strengths were his decisiveness as a political leader and effectiveness as a war leader. Also Fraser greatly admires Cromwell's ability to rise from modest origins to the pinnacle of political power in England. He understood people and how to gain their loyalty and respect. Fraser counts him as one of the greatest leaders history has produced.

Fraser succeeded in "humanising" Cromwell and the book received much critical acclaim when it was published. It succeeded in exploding the myth of Cromwell as a scheming power hungry hypocrite and presented the man as a complex person, a man who changed the course of history but also as a man of his age, not a tyrant, but a person who struggled with his conscience and truly lived according to his beliefs.

== Sources ==
- Fraser, Antonia Cromwell, Our Chief of Men
