= The Gunpowder Plot: Terror and Faith in 1605 =

1996 book by Antonia Fraser

- Author: Antonia Fraser
- Publisher: Weidenfeld & Nicolson
- Publication date: United Kingdom; 1996
- Pages: 408
- ISBN: 0-297-81348-X

The Gunpowder Plot: Terror and Faith in 1605 is a 1996 book by Antonia Fraser published by Weidenfeld & Nicolson.

== Content ==
The work is a history of the Gunpowder Plot of 1605. According to Fraser, it was an event that did happen (and was not fabricated by the existing government, as argued by what she refers to as 'No-Plotters' in subsequent historiography) though its precise nature and significance is open to historical debate. Fraser argues that there was indeed a plot, though it was rather different in type and details from the one described by a contemporary such as Sir Edward Coke.

Fraser's opinion is that the plot represented an act of political terrorism, based on her definition of it as being "the weapon of the weak, pretending to be strong". An alternative categorisation is that it was in fact an attempted political coup d'état which did not aim to damage the pre-existing political establishment but instead to usurp and replace it.

She also argues that few of the facts surrounding the case are unambiguous or beyond discussion, drawing in 653 references citing in excess of 276 sources to prove that multiple aspects of the plot are in fact shrouded in mystery and competing claims to authenticity. As one example, she favours the view that Robert Cecil, 1st Earl of Salisbury was responsible for the authorship of the anonymous Monteagle letter warning the Catholic Lord Monteagle to avoid Parliament on the day of the plot, rather than another figure such as Francis Tresham.

Fraser is sympathetic towards the Catholic gentry who practiced their religion in the presence of discriminatory legislation under the rule of Elizabeth I and James I, conditions that were, as one contemporary priest described, a "ruthless and unloving land" for those of the Catholic faith.
