= Rebecca Fraser =

British writer and broadcaster

- Born: May 1957 (age 69)
- Citizenship: British
- Spouse: Edward Fitzgerald
- Children: 3 daughters
- Parent(s): Sir Hugh Fraser; Lady Antonia Pakenham
- Writing career
- Genre: Biography

Rebecca Rose Fraser (born May 1957) is a British writer and broadcaster.

She is a former president of the Brontë Society. She is the author of the introductions to the Everyman's Library editions of Shirley and The Professor.

Her husband is Edward Fitzgerald KC.

== Selected publications ==
- Charlotte Bronte, London: Methuen London, 1988. ISBN 9780413570109, OCLC 17982643
- The Brontës: Charlotte Brontë and her family, New York: Fawcett Columbine, 1988. ISBN 9780449904657, OCLC 21015060
- A People's History Of Britain. London: Pimlico. 2004. ISBN 9781844135523 – via Internet Archive., OCLC 59187745
- The Mayflower Generation, New York: St. Martin's Press, 2017. ISBN 9781250108562, OCLC 989124127
