= Gunpowder (disambiguation) =

Gunpowder most commonly refers to:

- Black powder, a propellant used in early firearms
- Smokeless powder, a propellant used in modern firearms

Gunpowder may also refer to:

== Arts and media ==
- "Gunpowder" (song), by Wyclef Jean
- Gunpowder (TV series), a 2017 British historical drama television series
- Gunpowder, a character in the media franchise, The Boys

== Places ==
- Gunpowder, Queensland, Australia
- Gunpowder River, Maryland, U.S.
- Gunpowder Town, an abandoned town, now Joppatowne, Maryland, U.S.

== Other uses ==
- Gunpowder tea, a form of Chinese tea
- A slang term for the South Asian spice mix idli podi or milagai podi.

== See also ==
- Gunpowder empires
- Gunpowder Incident
- Gunpowder mill, where gunpowder is manufactured
- Gunpowder Plot
