= Marie Antoinette: The Journey =

2001 book by Antonia Fraser

- Author: Antonia Fraser
- Language: English
- Publisher: Weidenfeld & Nicolson
- Publication date: 2001
- Publication place: U.K.
- Pages: 496

Marie Antoinette: The Journey is a sympathetic 2001 biography of archduchess Marie Antoinette, the Queen of France (1774–1792) by Antonia Fraser. It is the basis for the 2006 Sofia Coppola film Marie Antoinette.

The book, which was relaunched to coincide with the release of the related film, has had considerable success. It has been translated into French and Italian, been awarded the Enid McLeod Literary Prize, received critical praise including being described "definitive" by British historian, Amanda Foreman, author of a bestselling biography of Georgiana, duchess of Devonshire. It is considered, by some modern historians, as the most thorough and balanced biography of the queen, though it naturally builds upon earlier biographies, first-hand accounts, and even the infamous libelles that destroyed the queen's reputation.

== Summary ==
Beginning with Marie Antoinette's mother, Empress Maria Theresa, the book chronicles the life of Marie Antoinette and how she, though the youngest of her mother's daughters, was selected to marry the future king of France.

Fraser depicts a young dauphine, and eventual queen, unfairly maligned due to decades of anti-Austrian sentiment and xenophobia who was never comfortable in her role as influencer and ambassadress to Austria in a French court in which she was treated with derision and hostility.

== Reception ==
It was described by The Guardian as an "excellent biography".

== First editions ==
- London: Weidenfeld & Nicolson, 2001. ISBN 0-297-81908-9
- New York: Doubleday, 2001. ISBN 0-385-48948-X

== Paperback edition ==
- London: Orion Publishing Group, 2006. ISBN 0-7538-2140-0 (10). ISBN 978-0-7538-2140-4 (13).
