= B. F. Gribble =

English painter (1872–1962)

Bernard Finegan Gribble
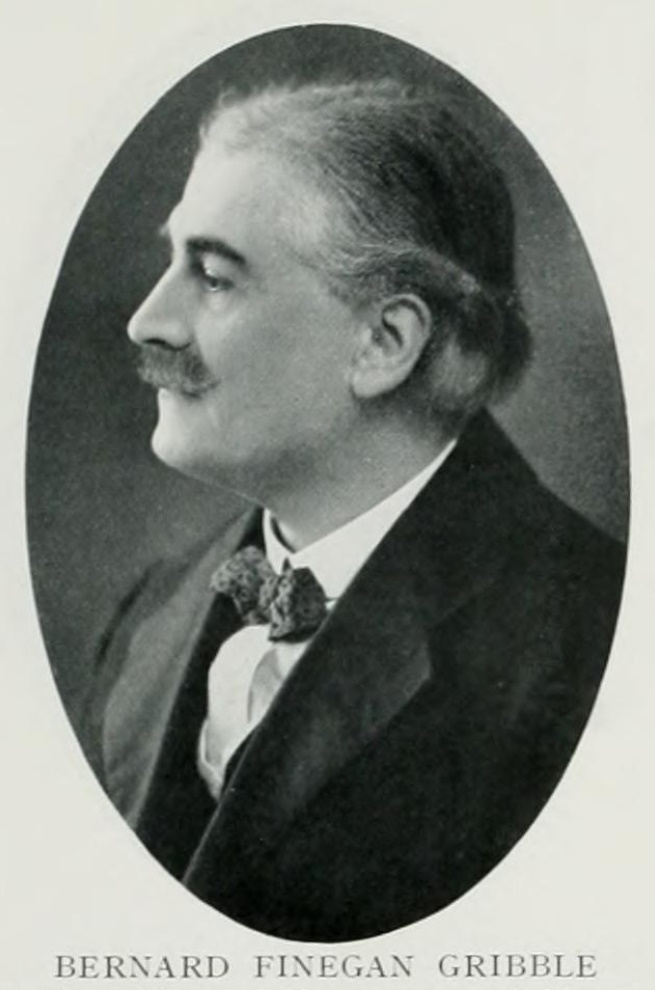
- Gribble in 1921
- Born: Bernard Emmanuel Finegan Gribble; 10 May 1872; South Kensington, London
- Died: 21 February 1962 (aged 89); Poole, Dorset
- Education: College of St. Francis Xavier; South Kensington Art School
- Occupations: Artist, painter, illustrator
- Spouse: Eleanor Mabel ('Nellie') Clunn
- Parent(s): Herbert Augustine Keate, Julia Mary (née Finagan)

Bernard Finegan Gribble (10 May 1872 – 21 February 1962) was a British artist and illustrator who specialised in marine subjects. Although he also painted portraits and landscapes, much of Gribble's artistic production was concerned with the drama and excitement of ships and sailors on the high seas or at port, whether as historical tableaux or representing contemporary events and subjects.

== Biography ==
=== Early life ===
Bernard Finegan Gribble was born at South Kensington, London on 10 May 1872, the youngest of two children of Herbert Augustine Keate, an architect known for designing Brompton Oratory and Armada Memorial, Julia Mary (née Finagan). Bernard was educated at the College of St. Francis Xavier in Bruges, Belgium. He briefly studied under his father and then studied drawing at the South Kensington Art School, where one of his tutors was Albert Toft.

=== Career ===
In 1891, Gribble's painting The Burning of the 'Mentmore' was exhibited at the Royal Academy. In 1898, Bernard was employed as an artist-correspondent to The Queen and Black and White, where he covered both the Spanish-American War and the Fashoda Incident.

Gribble exhibited regularly at the Royal Academy from 1898 to 1904 and at the Paris Salon from 1905. He also exhibited at the Royal Institute of Oil Painters and the Royal Glasgow Institute of the Fine Arts. In 1912, he was appointed as marine artist to the Worshipful Company of Shipwrights.

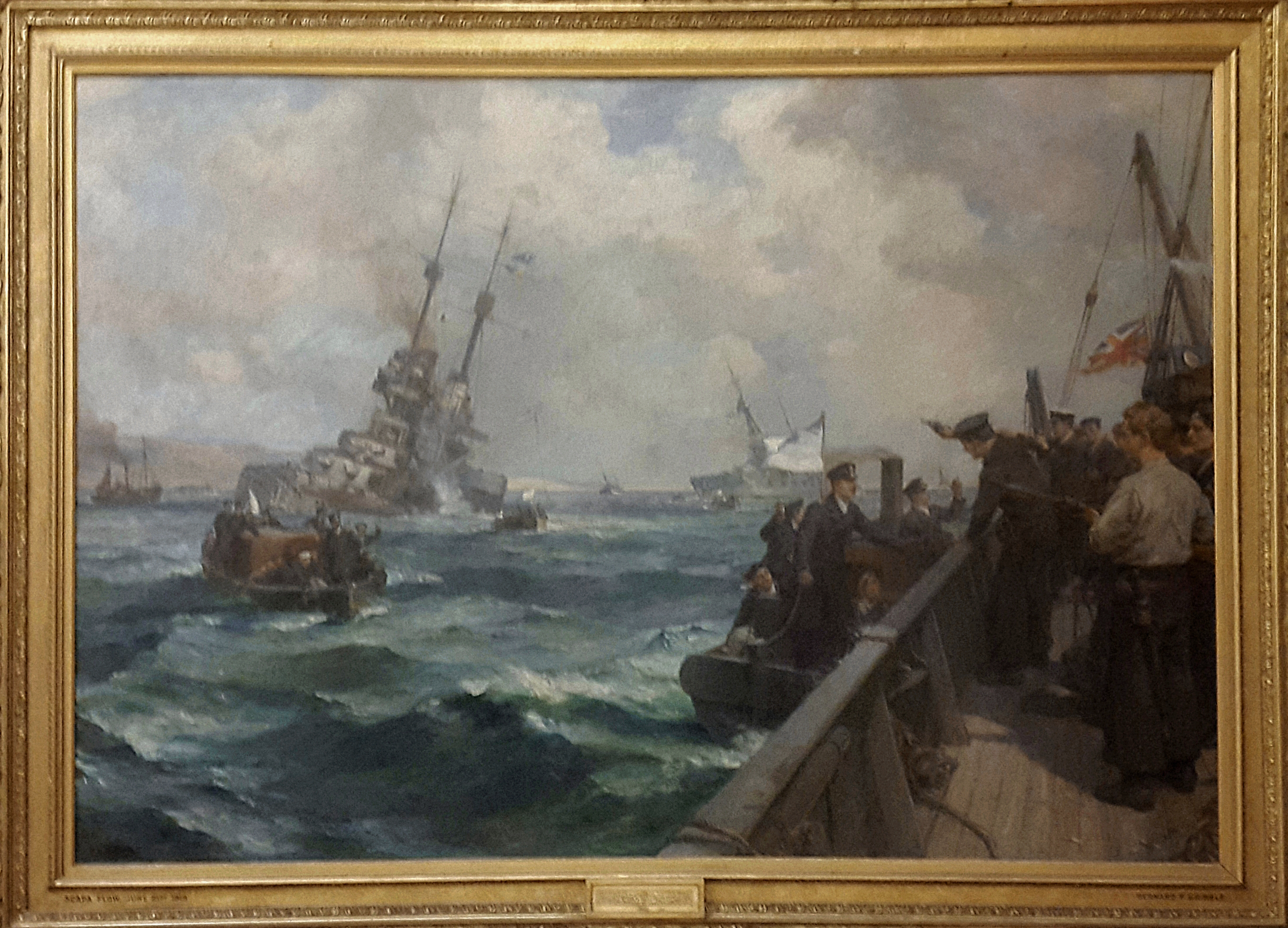
The Sinking of the German Fleet at Scapa Flow

Gribble was the first official artist appointed during World War I, during which, much of this work was with the Royal Navy. Gribble was present at the scuttling of the German fleet at Scapa Flow, where he witnessed the events on board the trawler Sochisin and produced two large oil paintings from the experience. One of these, The Sinking of the German Fleet at Scapa Flow, depicts German sailors from the cruiser Frankfurt approaching Sochisin in a lifeboat, the Sochisin crew ordering them at gunpoint to return to their sinking ship.

=== Personal life and death ===
In 1902, Bernard Gribble and Eleanor Mabel Clunn (known as 'Nellie') were married at Kensington. They had no children and by the 1920s, they had left London to live at Poole in county Dorset. The Poole and East Dorset Art Society was founded in 1924, with Gribble as its first chairman.

Bernard Gribble died in Poole on 21 February 1962 at age 89, and was buried in Parkstone cemetery. After his death, Nellie donated many of his works to Poole Museum. Nellie died on 8 September 1963 and was buried with her husband.

== Works ==
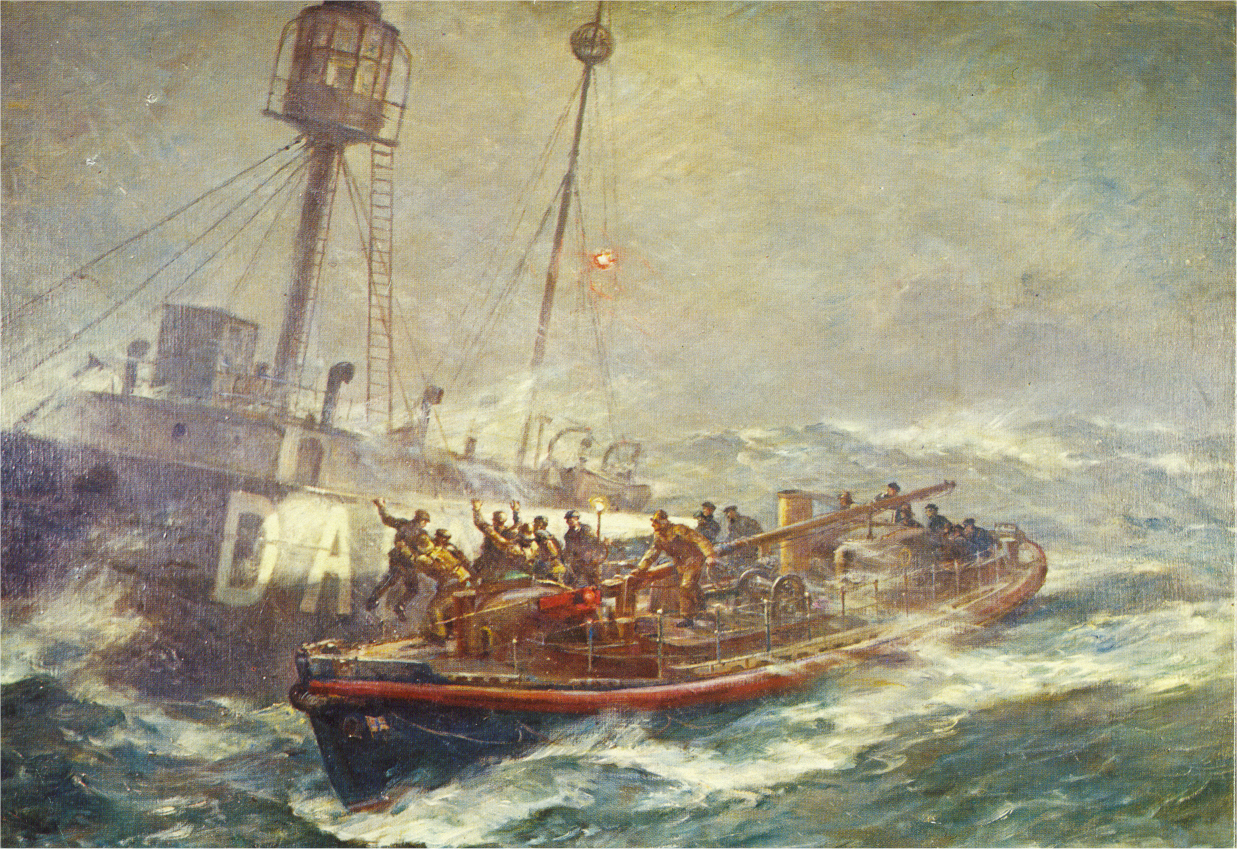
Oil painting of the rescue of the Daunt Lightship crew by the RNLB Mary Stanford

Although Gribble's work included landscapes and portraits, he was best known for his historical and often romanticized maritime scenes. For these, he included highly technical analyses of sail construction and rigging, paid close attention to costume detail, and studied the movement of water. In his preparatory sketches, he made notes on the precise structure and names of sails, masts, and rigging. One critic described him as a "specialist in burning ships", while others compared his paintings to the fine marine vistas of Henry Moore. Spanish galleons and treasure vessels are also well represented in his work

Poole Museum owns the largest collection of Gribble's work: 250 paintings, drawings, prints, and photographs. Paintings in the collection include The Plague Ship, The Whelp of the Black Rover, The Return of the Argosy Galleons, a portrait of former Mayor of Poole Herbert Carter, and a portrait of a woman believed to be Gribble's wife Nellie. The collection also contains local topographical work, such as depictions of the Guildhall, Custom House, and views of the Quay and harbour.

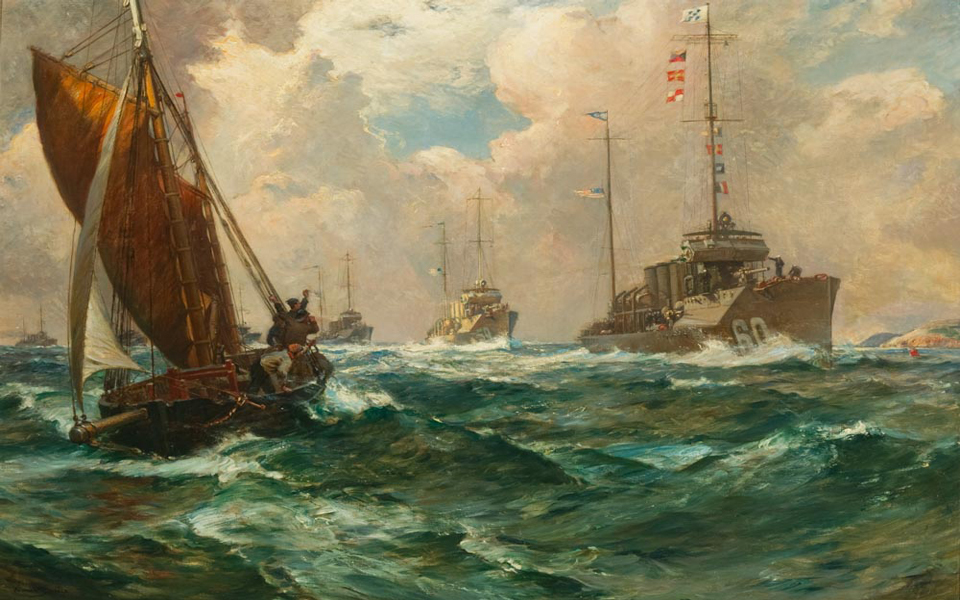
Return of the Mayflower

Other owners of Gribble paintings included President Franklin D. Roosevelt, First Lady Jackie Onassis, Queen Mary of Teck, and Kaiser Wilhelm II. Roosevelt commissioned smaller versions of two of Gribble's paintings: Return of the Mayflower and Surrender of the German Fleet to the Grand Fleet at Scapa Flow, both of which hung in the Oval Office. Kaiser Willhelm was so impressed by Gribble's work that King George V summoned him to his royal residence.

Gribble also worked as an illustrator. His work appeared in numerous magazines, including The Illustrated London News and The Graphic, and he also provided illustrations for the last of Arthur Conan Doyle's pirate stories. Gribble also illustrated several books and his work was published on royal postcards, menus, and chocolate boxes.

=== Official purchases ===
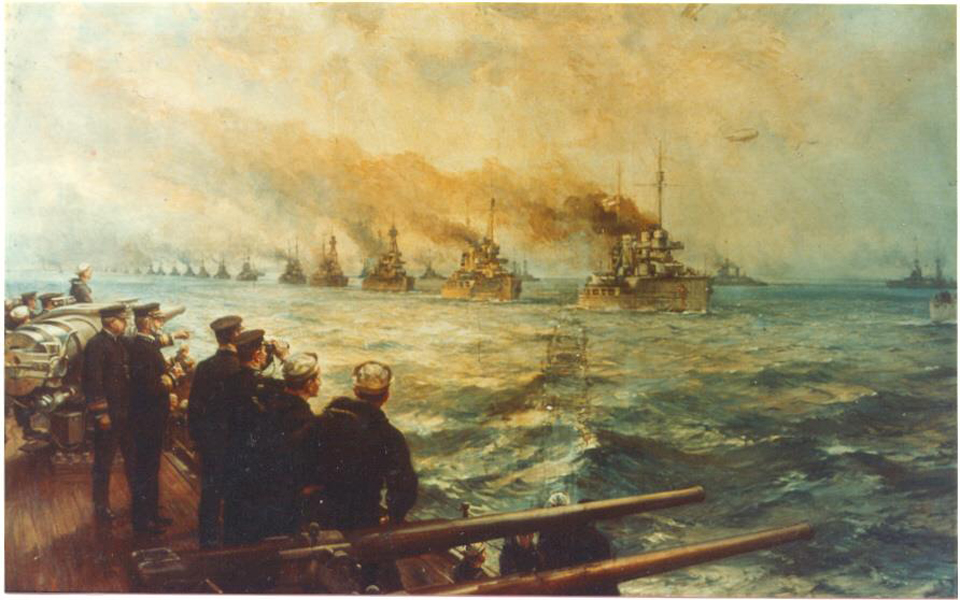
Surrender of the German Fleet to the Grand Fleet at Scapa Flow

- Sinking of German Fleet, Scapa Flow 1918 — Preston Art Gallery and Museum
- The Doomed Fleet — Bristol Museum and Art Gallery
- The Captain's Last Landing, No Surrender from the Pirate Captain, and Departure of the Pilgrim Fathers — Plymouth City Museum and Art Gallery
- Market St, Poole — Russell-Cotes Art Gallery & Museum
- Bournemouth, Our Golden Argosies (canvas) — presented by D Elliot Alves esq to the Federal Parliament House
- Return of the Mayflower and Surrender of the German Fleet to the Grand Fleet at Scapa Flow
  - Originals — United States Naval Academy
  - Smaller originals — Franklin D. Roosevelt
- The Duchess of York Receiving the Freedom of the Worshipful Company of Shipwrights — National Maritime Museum

== Recognition ==
In December 1941, Newfoundland issued a stamp featuring Gribble's painting Grenfell on the Strathcona to commemorate the 150th anniversary of the founding of Wilfred Grenfell's medical mission to the colony. The United States also considered Gribble's painting Surrender of the German Fleet to the Grand Fleet at Scapa Flow for a seventeen cent postage stamp in the 1930s US Army and Navy commemorative series.

== Sources and external links ==
- 62 artworks by or after B. F. Gribble at the Art UK site
- The Paintings of Bernard Finnigan Gribble
- Roger Guttridge (2001), 'No-one could paint the sea as well', Dorset Life, October 2001.
- Who's Who in Art, The Art Trade Press, Ltd., 1962, 10th Edition.
- Who Was Who 1961–1970. A & C Black. 1979. ISBN 0-7136-2008-0.
