= Antonia Fraser =

British author and novelist (born 1932)

Lady Antonia Fraser CH DBE FRSL
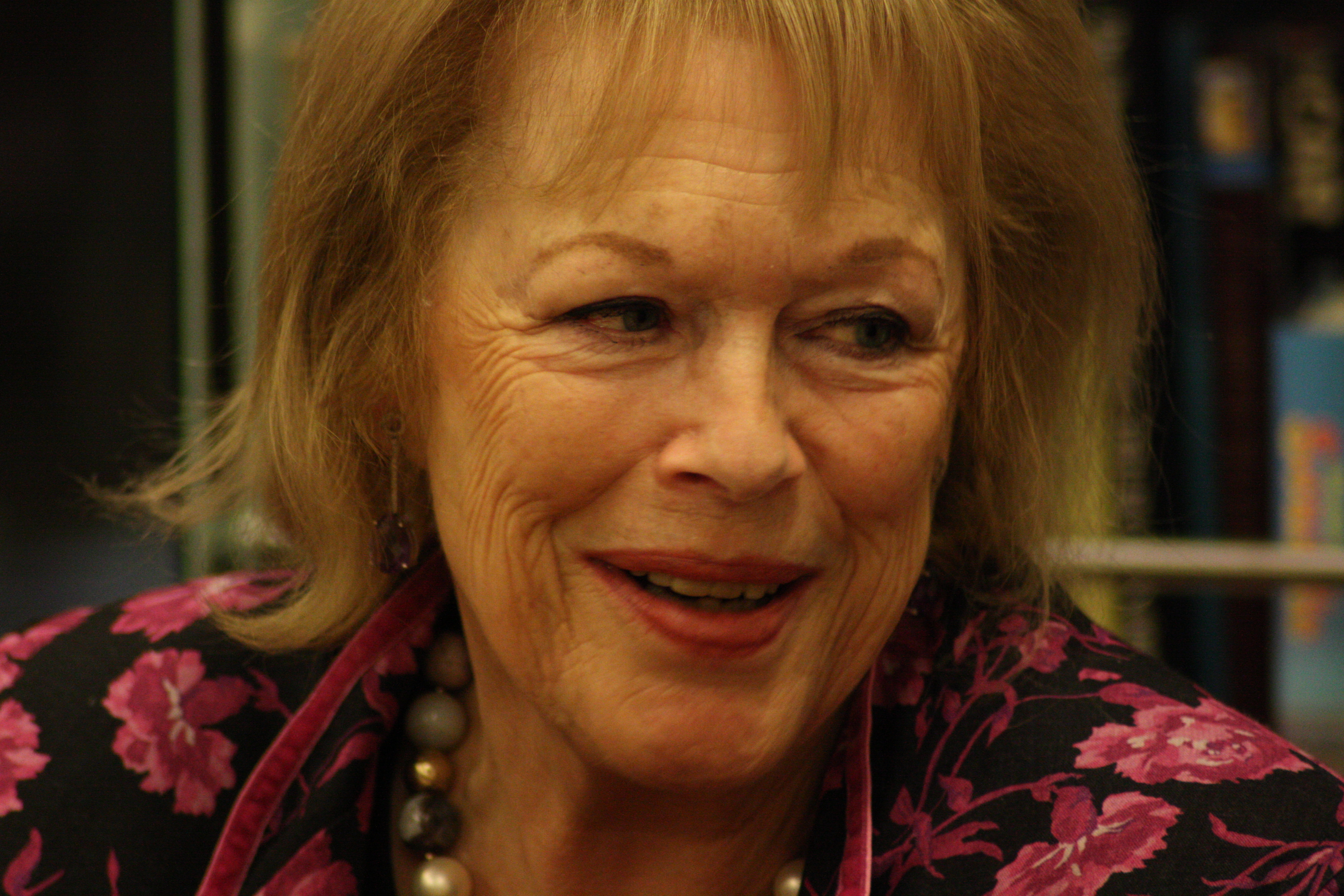
- Fraser in 2010
- Born: Antonia Margaret Caroline Pakenham; 27 August 1932 (age 94); London, England
- Education: Lady Margaret Hall, Oxford
- Spouses: Hugh Fraser (m. 1956; div. 1977) Harold Pinter (m. 1980; died 2008)
- Children: 6, including Rebecca Fraser, Orlando Fraser, and Flora Fraser
- Parents: Frank Pakenham, 7th Earl of Longford (father); Elizabeth Harman (mother)
- Writing career
- Years active: 1969–present
- Genres: Biography, detective fiction
- Antonia Fraser's voice from the BBC programme Desert Island Discs, 27 July 2008.
- Website: www.antoniafraser.com

Lady Antonia Margaret Caroline Fraser (née Pakenham; born 27 August 1932) is a British author of history, novels, biographies and detective fiction.

She is the widow of the 2005 Nobel Laureate in Literature, Harold Pinter, and prior to his death in 2008 was also known as Lady Antonia Pinter.

== Family background and education ==
Antonia Margaret Caroline Fraser was born in London on 27 August 1932 as the first of the eight children of Frank Pakenham, 7th Earl of Longford (1905–2001), and his wife, Elizabeth, Countess of Longford (née Harman; 1906–2002). As the daughter of an earl, she is accorded the courtesy title "Lady" and thus customarily addressed formally as "Lady Antonia".

As a teenager, she and her siblings converted to Roman Catholicism, following the conversions of their parents. Her "maternal grandparents were Unitarians – a non-conformist faith with a strong emphasis on social reform". In response to criticism of her writing about Oliver Cromwell, she has said, "I have no Catholic blood". Before his own conversion in his thirties following a nervous breakdown in the British Army, as she explains: "My father was Protestant Church of Ireland, and my mother was Unitarian up to the age of 20 when she abandoned it."

She was educated at Dragon School in Oxford, St Mary's School, Ascot, and Lady Margaret Hall, Oxford; the last was also her mother's alma mater. Prior to going to the University of Oxford in 1950, she was a debutante in the London social season.

== Career ==
Fraser began work as an "all-purpose assistant" for George Weidenfeld at Weidenfeld & Nicolson (her "only job"), which later became her own publisher and part of Orion Publishing Group, which publishes her works in the UK.

=== Biography and history ===
Fraser's first major work was Mary, Queen of Scots (1969), published by Weidenfeld & Nicolson, which was followed by several other biographies, including Cromwell, Our Chief of Men (1973).

Fraser acknowledges she is "less interested in ideas than in 'the people who led nations' and so on. I don't think I could ever have written a history of political thought or anything like that. I'd have to come at it another way." Fraser's study, The Warrior Queens (1989), is an account of military royal women since the days of Boadicea and Cleopatra. In 1992, a year after Alison Weir's book The Six Wives of Henry VIII, she published a book with the same title.

She chronicled the life and times of Charles II in a well-reviewed 1979 eponymous biography. The book was cited as an influence on the 2003 BBC/A&E mini-series Charles II: The Power & the Passion, in a featurette on the DVD, by Rufus Sewell, who played the title character. Fraser served as editor for many monarchical biographies, including those featured in the Kings and Queens of England and Royal History of England series, and in 1996 she also published a book entitled The Gunpowder Plot: Terror and Faith in 1605, which won both the St. Louis Literary Award and the Crime Writers' Association (CWA) Non-Fiction Gold Dagger.

Her book Marie Antoinette: The Journey (2001), was adapted for the film Marie Antoinette (2006), directed by Sofia Coppola, with Kirsten Dunst in the title role, and Love and Louis XIV: The Women in the Life of the Sun King (2006). She contemplated a biography of Queen Elizabeth I, but shelved the idea as this subject has already been extensively covered.

Fraser won the Wolfson History Award in 1984 for The Weaker Vessel, a study of women's lives in 17th-century England.

=== Other writing ===
Fraser has written detective novels, the most popular a series of ten written between 1977 and 1995 and involving a female television personality and detective named Jemima Shore; the latter were adapted into the television series Jemima Shore Investigates, which aired in the UK in 1983. Early publications included volumes on dolls and toys. Her first book was a volume about King Arthur, one edition of which was illustrated by her eldest daughter; it was written for a series for Marks and Spencer, as was a later volume about Robin Hood.

=== Media and societies ===
From 1988 to 1989 Fraser was president of English PEN, and she chaired its Writers in Prison Committee.

From 1983 to 1984 she was president of the Sir Walter Scott Club in Edinburgh. She serves as a judge for the Enid McLeod Literary Prize, awarded by the Franco-British Society, previously winning that prize for her biography Marie Antoinette.

Fraser is a vice-president of the London Library. She has also been a vice-president of the Royal Stuart Society.

Fraser was a contestant on the BBC Radio 4 panel game My Word! from 1979 to 1990.

=== Memoirs ===
Fraser's first memoir Must You Go? My Life with Harold Pinter was published in January 2010 and she read a shortened version as BBC Radio Four's Book of the Week that month. Her second memoir, My History. A Memoir of Growing Up was published a few years later.

== Marriages and later life ==
From 1956 until their divorce in 1977, she was married to Sir Hugh Fraser (1918–1984), a descendant of Scottish aristocracy 14 years her senior and a Roman Catholic Conservative Unionist MP in the House of Commons (sitting for Stafford), who was a friend of the American Kennedy family. They had six children, including Rebecca Fraser and Flora Fraser.

On 22 October 1975 Hugh and Antonia Fraser, together with Caroline Kennedy, who was visiting them at their Holland Park home, in Kensington, west London, were almost blown up by a Provisional Irish Republican Army car bomb placed under the wheels of his Jaguar car, which had been triggered to go off at 9 am when he left the house; the bomb exploded, killing the cancer researcher Gordon Hamilton Fairley. Fairley, a neighbour of the Frasers, had been walking his dog, when he noticed something amiss and stopped to examine the bomb.

In 1975 she began an affair with the playwright Harold Pinter, who was then married to the actress Vivien Merchant. In 1977, after she had been living with Pinter for two years, the Frasers' union was legally dissolved. Merchant spoke about her distress publicly to the press, which quoted her cutting remarks about her rival, but she resisted divorcing Pinter. In 1980, after Merchant signed divorce papers, Fraser and Pinter married in the Roman Catholic Church. Harold Pinter died of cancer on 24 December 2008, aged 78.

Fraser lives at Campden Hill Square, in the London district of Holland Park, in the Royal Borough of Kensington and Chelsea, south of Notting Hill Gate, in the Fraser family home, where she still writes in her fourth-floor study.

== Honours ==
Fraser was appointed Commander of the Order of the British Empire (CBE) in the 1999 Birthday Honours and promoted to Dame Commander of the Order of the British Empire (DBE) in the 2011 New Year Honours for services to literature. She was appointed a Member of the Order of the Companions of Honour (CH) in the 2018 New Year Honours for services to literature. She was elected a Fellow of the Royal Society of Literature in 2003.

== Archives ==
Fraser's uncatalogued papers (relating to her "Early Writing", "Fiction" and "Non-Fiction") are on loan at the British Library. Papers by and relating to Fraser are also catalogued as part of the Harold Pinter Archive, which is part of its permanent collection of Additional Manuscripts.

== Awards ==
- James Tait Black Memorial Prize (1969), for her book Mary, Queen of Scots.
- Wolfson History Prize (1984), for her book The Weaker Vessel.
- Crime Writers' Association Macallan Gold Dagger for Non-Fiction (1996), for her book The Gunpowder Plot.
- St. Louis Literary Award from the Saint Louis University Library Associates.
- Historical Association Norton Medlicott Medal (2000).
- Enid McLeod Literary Prize (2001), from the Franco-British Society, for Marie Antoinette.

== Works ==
=== Non-fiction works ===
- Mary Queen of Scots (1969). ISBN 0-385-31129-X.
  - Reissued, Phoenix paperback, 2001; ISBN 978-1-84212-446-8.
  - 40th-anniversary edition, reissued Orion paperback, 7 May 2009; ISBN 978-0-7538-2654-6.
- Dolls (1963)
- A History of Toys (1966)
- Cromwell, Our Chief of Men (1973);
  - Also published as Cromwell: The Lord Protector. ISBN 0-8021-3766-0.
- King James VI and I (1974)
- The Lives of the Kings and Queens of England (1975) [editor]
- King Charles II (1979)
  - Also published as Royal Charles: Charles II and the Restoration and Charles II; ISBN 0-7538-1403-X.
- Heroes and Heroines (1980)
- The Weaker Vessel: Woman's Lot in Seventeenth-century England (1984)
- The Warrior Queens: Boadicea's Chariot (1988), Weidenfeld and Nicolson, London.
  - Also published as Warrior Queens: The Legends and Lives of Women Who have led Their Nations in War.
- The Six Wives of Henry VIII (London: Weidenfeld and Nicolson, 1992); Orion, 1999, ISBN 978-0-297-64355-5.
  - Rpt. & updated edition, London: Weidenfeld and Nicolson, 2007.
  - Also published as the Orion audio-book The Six Wives of Henry VIII (November 2006); ISBN 0-7528-8913-3.
  - The illustrated edition is The Six Wives of Henry VIII. Illustrated Edition (London: Weidenfeld & Nicolson, 1996); ISBN 978-0-2978-3567-7.
  - The first paperback edition is The Six Wives of Henry VIII (London: Mandarin, 1993); ISBN 978-0-7493-1409-5.
  - The 1st American edition is entitled The Wives of Henry VIII (New York: Knopf, 1992); ISBN 978-0-394-58538-3.
- The Gunpowder Plot: Terror and Faith in 1605 (1996)
  - Also published as Faith and Treason: The Gunpowder Plot; ISBN 0-385-47189-0.
- Marie Antoinette (2001); ISBN 0-385-48949-8
  - Also published with the subtitle Marie Antoinette: The Journey, (2002); ISBN 978-0-7538-2140-4.
- Love and Louis XIV: The Women in the Life of the Sun King (2006); ISBN 0-297-82997-1.
- Must You Go? My Life with Harold Pinter (2010), London: Weidenfeld & Nicolson (Orion Books); ISBN 978-0-297-85971-0.
  - 1st U.S. edition, New York: Nan A. Talese/Doubleday; ISBN 978-0-385-53250-1.
  - 1st paperback edition London: Phoenix, 2010; ISBN 978-0-7538-2758-1
  - Also published in audio & digital editions) - "Shortlisted for Galaxy National Book Awards: Non-Fiction Book of the Year 2010."
- Perilous Question: The Drama of the Great Reform Bill 1832 (2013); ISBN 978-0-7538-2922-6
- My History. A Memoir of Growing Up (2015), New York: Doubleday. ISBN 978-0-3855-4010-0
- Our Israeli Diary: Of That Time, Of That Place (2017); ISBN 978-1-7860-7153-8
- The King and the Catholics: The Fight for Rights, 1829 (2018); ISBN 978-1-4746-0193-1
- The Case of the Married Woman: Caroline Norton: A 19th Century Heroine Who Wanted Justice for Women (2021); ISBN 978-1-4746-2405-3
- Lady Caroline Lamb: A Free Spirit (2023); ISBN 978-1-6393-6405-3

=== Historical fiction ===
- King Arthur and the Knights of the Round Table (1954)
- Robin Hood (1955)

=== Jemima Shore novels ===
- Quiet as a Nun (1977)
- The Wild Island (1978). Also published as Tartan Tragedy.
- A Splash of Red (1981)
- Cool Repentance (1982)
- Oxford Blood (1985)
- Jemima Shore's First Case (1986)
- Your Royal Hostage (1987)
- The Cavalier Case (1990)
- Jemima Shore at the Sunny Grave (1991)
- Political Death (1995)
- Quiet as a Nun / Tartan Tragedy / Splash of Red (omnibus) (2005)
- Jemima Shore on the Case (omnibus) (2006)

=== Editor ===
- Scottish Love Poems (1975)
- The Lives of the Kings and Queens of England (1975)
- Love Letters (1976)
- The Pleasure of Reading (1992)
- A Red Rose or A Satin Heart (2010)

== See also ==
- Earl of Longford
