= Elizabeth Tilley =

Early English colonist in North America

- Born: c. August 1607; Henlow, Bedfordshire, England
- Died: December 21, 1687; Massachusetts
- Spouse: John Howland
- Children: 10
- Father: John Tilley

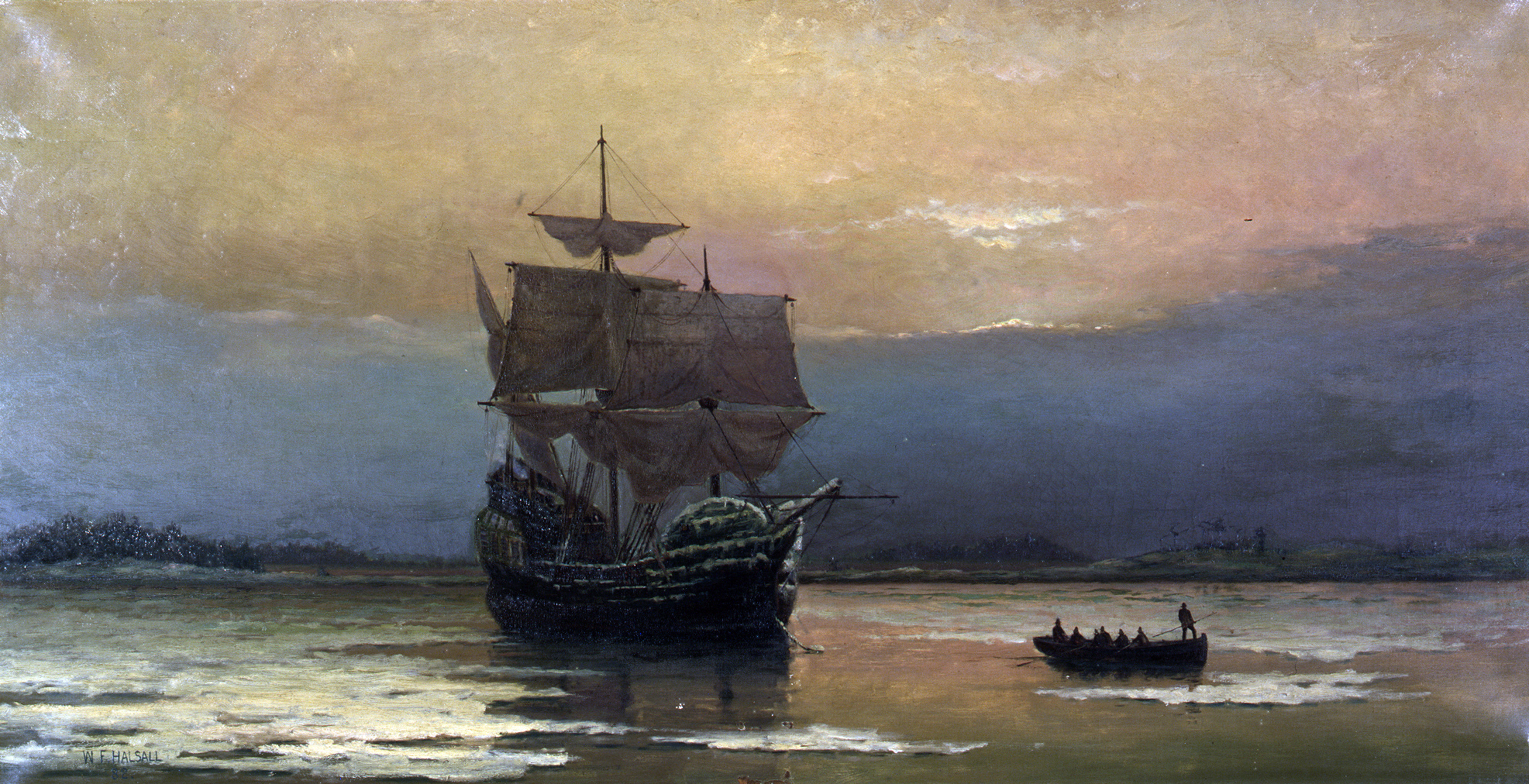
Mayflower in Plymouth Harbor by William Halsall (1882). This painting is in the Pilgrim Hall Museum, Plymouth, Massachusetts.

Elizabeth Tilley (c. August 1607 – December 21, 1687) was one of the passengers on the historic 1620 voyage of the Mayflower and a participant in the first Thanksgiving in the New World. She was the daughter of Mayflower passenger John Tilley and his wife Joan Hurst and, although she was their youngest child, appears to be the only one who survived the voyage. She went on to marry fellow Mayflower passenger John Howland, with whom she had ten children and 88 grandchildren. Because of their great progeny, she and her husband have millions of living descendants today.

== Early life ==
Elizabeth Tilley was born in Henlow, Bedfordshire, England, where she was baptized in August, 1607. According to parish records, she was the youngest of five children born to her parents. She also had an older step-sister, Joan, from her mother's first marriage to Thomas Rogers (no relation to the Mayflower passenger of the same name).

It is likely that when she was a small girl, she moved with her parents to the Netherlands, where her parents and her uncle Edward Tilley are documented as members of the Leiden Separatist congregation. Edward's ward, Henry Samson, may also have been a member.

== On the Mayflower and in the New World ==
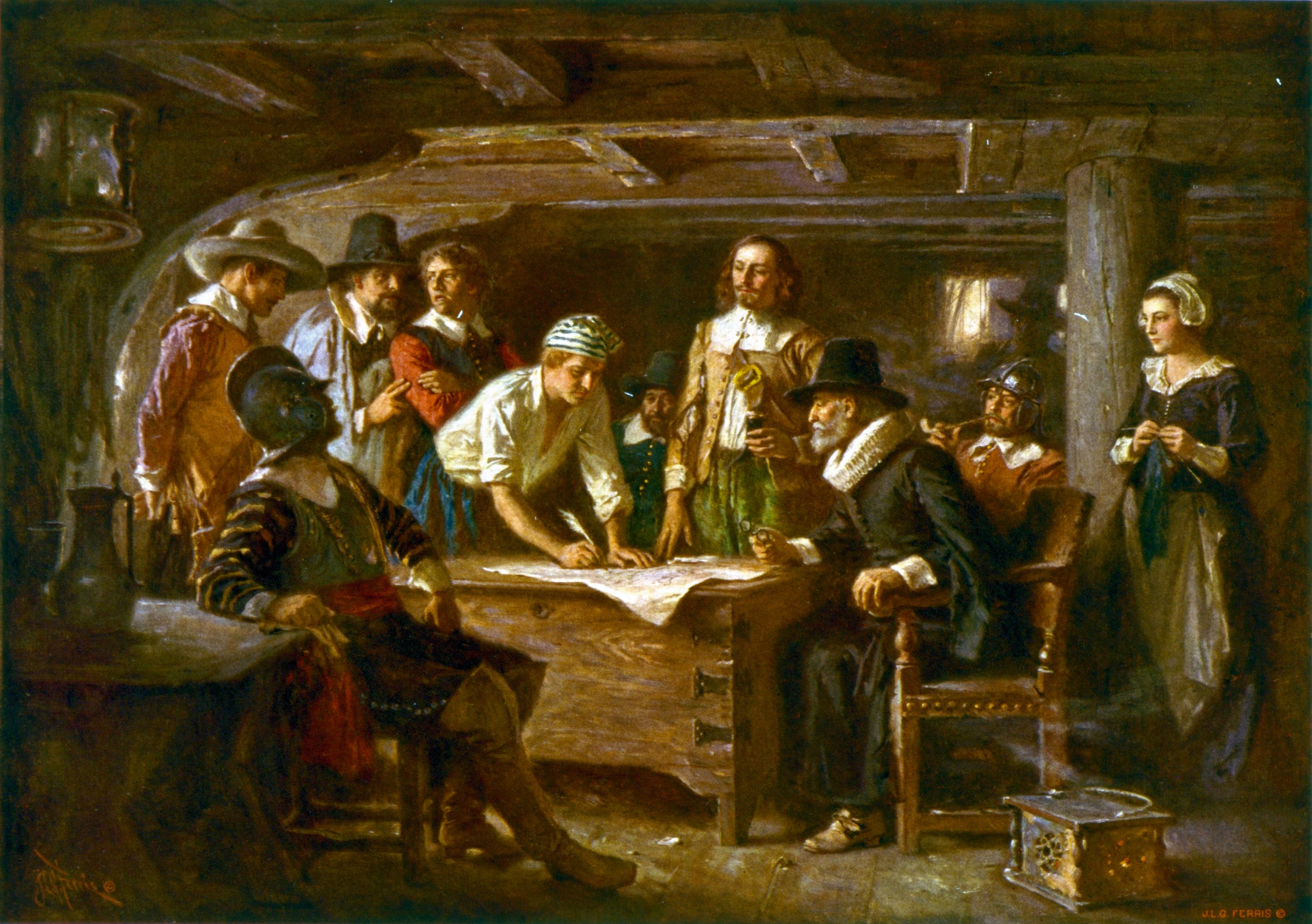
Signing the Mayflower Compact 1620, a painting by Jean Leon Gerome Ferris 1899

William Bradford, in his memoirs, listed the Tilley family on the Mayflower as: "John Tillie, and his wife; and Elizabeth, their daughter." Elizabeth would have been about 13 years old during the journey.

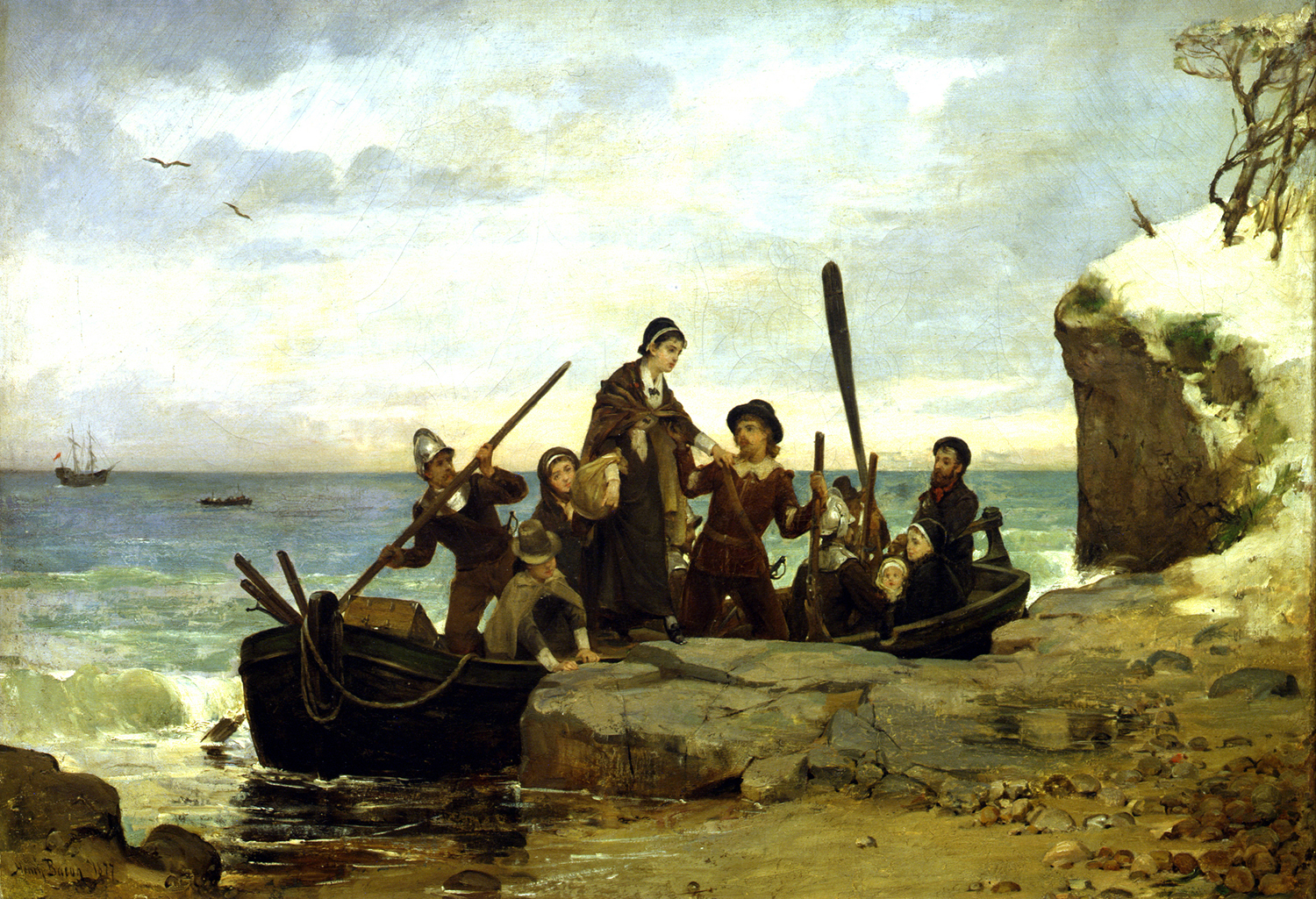
The Landing of the Pilgrims (1877) by Henry A. Bacon. This painting is in the Pilgrim Hall Museum, Plymouth, Massachusetts.

The Mayflower departed Plymouth, England, on September 6/16, 1620. The small, 100-foot ship had 102 passengers and a crew of about 30–40 in extremely cramped conditions. By the second month out, the ship was being buffeted by strong westerly gales, causing the ship's timbers to be badly shaken with caulking failing to keep out sea water, and with passengers, even in their berths, lying wet and ill. This, combined with a lack of proper rations and unsanitary conditions for several months, attributed to what would be fatal for many, especially the majority of women and children. On the way there were two deaths, a crew member and a passenger.

On November 9/19, 1620, after about three months at sea, including a month of delays in England, they spotted land, which was the Cape Cod Hook, now called Provincetown Harbor. After several days of trying to get south to their planned destination of the Colony of Virginia, strong winter seas forced them to return to the harbor at Cape Cod hook, where they anchored on November 11/21. The Mayflower Compact was signed that day. Elizabeth's father, John Tilley signed as "John Tilly."

== In the New World ==
Upon arriving in the New World, John Tilley took part in early expeditions of exploration around their new home and was present at the first meeting between the Pilgrims and Native Americans, later known as the First Encounter.

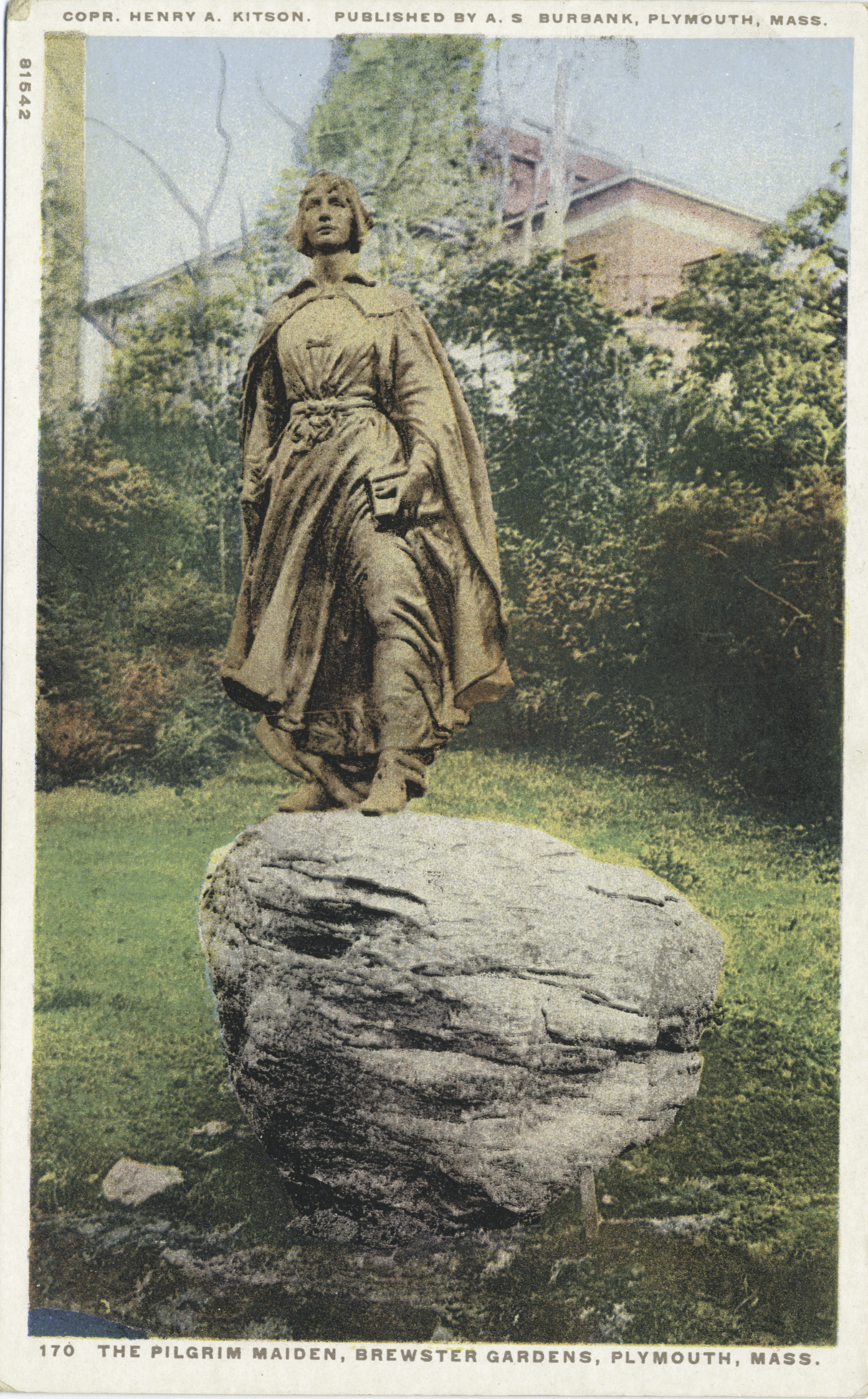
"The Pilgrim Maiden" statue, Brewster Gardens, Plymouth, Massachusetts. This statue by Henry Hudson Kitson is not of a particular Pilgrim, but the subject represented most closely fits Elizabeth Tilley and Mary Chilton in age.

Elizabeth's parents both died the first winter, as did her uncle, Edward Tilley, and aunt, Ann. This left Elizabeth an orphan and so she was taken in by the Carver family. The elder Carvers died about a year later, and part of their estate was inherited by their servant, John Howland, and Elizabeth became his ward.

== Family and children ==
Although the date of their marriage is not recorded, a few years after their arrival in the New World, Elizabeth married John Howland (c. 1623/4). She and John would go on to have ten children, all of whom would live to adulthood, and 86 grandchildren. Elizabeth outlived her husband by 14 years, being one of the few original Pilgrims to live to see King Philip's War.

=== Children of John and Elizabeth Howland ===
1. Desire was born about 1624 and died in Barnstable October 13, 1683. She married John Gorham in Plymouth by 1644 and had eleven children. She was buried at Cobb's Hill Cemetery, Barnstable, Mass.
2. John was born in Plymouth on February 24, 1626/7, and died in Barnstable after June 18, 1699. He married Mary Lee in Plymouth on October 26, 1651, and had ten children.
3. Hope was born in Plymouth about 1629 and died in Barnstable on January 8, 1683. She married John Chipman about 1647 and had twelve children. She was buried at Lothrop Hill Cemetery, Barnstable, Mass.
4. Elizabeth was born about 1631 and died in Oyster Bay, New York, in October 1683.
  Elizabeth married:
  Ephraim Hicks on September 13, 1649. He died on December 12, 1649.
  John Dickinson in Plymouth on July 10, 1651, and had nine children.
5. Lydia was born about 1633 and died in Swansea January, 1710/11. She married James Brown(e) about 1655 and had four children.
6. Hannah was born about 1637. She married Jonathan Bosworth in Swansea on July 6, 1661, and had nine children.
7. Joseph was born about 1640 and died in Plymouth in January 1703/04. He married Elizabeth Southworth in Plymouth on December 7, 1664, and had nine children.
8. Jabez was born about 1644 and died before February 21, 1711/12. He married Bethiah Thatcher by 1669 and had eleven children.
9. Ruth was born about 1646 and died before October 1679. She married Thomas Cushman in Plymouth on November 17, 1664, and had three children.
10. Isaac was born in Plymouth on November 15, 1649, and died in Middleboro on March 9, 1723/4. He married Elizabeth Vaughn by 1677 and had eight children. He was buried at Cemetery At The Green, Middleboro, Mass.

=== Notable descendants ===
John and Elizabeth Howland founded one of the three largest Mayflower progenies and their descendants have been "associated largely with both the 'Boston Brahmins' and Harvard's 'intellectual aristocracy' of the nineteenth and twentieth centuries."

Their direct descendants include notable figures such as:

- U.S. presidents Franklin D. Roosevelt, George H. W. Bush, and George W. Bush
- U.S. first ladies Edith Roosevelt and Barbara Bush
- Continental Congress President Nathaniel Gorham
- Former Governors Sarah Palin (Alaska), Jeb Bush (Florida), and Sanford B. Dole (Hawaii)
- Poets Ralph Waldo Emerson, Henry Wadsworth Longfellow, and Florence Earle Coates (a 9th generation descendant and a founding member (1896) of the Society of Mayflower Descendants in the Commonwealth of Pennsylvania (SMDPA))
- Actors/actresses Christopher Lloyd, Humphrey Bogart, Maude Adams, Anthony Perkins, Lillian Russell, the Baldwin brothers (Alec, Daniel, William and Stephen), and Chevy Chase.
- President and founder of the Latter Day Saint movement Joseph Smith, his wife Emma Hale, and President of the Church of Jesus Christ of Latter-day Saints, Brigham Young
- Opera singer and music educator William Howland
- Conductor and pianist Robert Spano
- Colin Tilley, American music video director for Riveting Entertainment
- Canada diplomat Warwick Fielding Chipman
- The wife of Theodore Roosevelt Alice Hathaway Lee Roosevelt
