= Jabez Howland House =

Historic house in Massachusetts, United States

- U.S. National Register of Historic Places
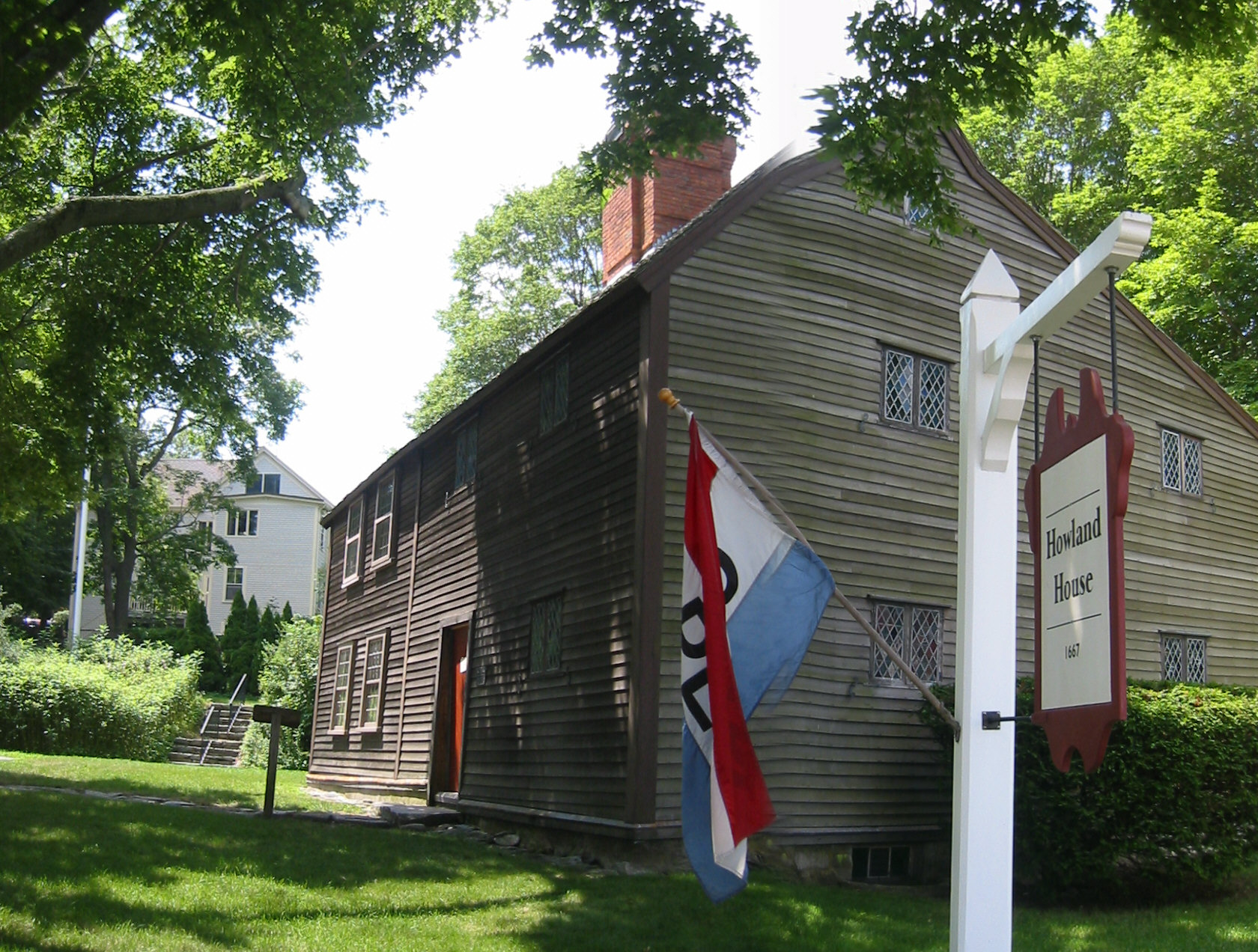

- Location within Massachusetts Location within the United States
- Location: Plymouth, Massachusetts
- Coordinates: 41°57′15″N 70°39′43″W
- Built: c.1667
- NRHP reference No.: 74002032
- Added to NRHP: October 9, 1974

The Jabez Howland House is a historic house at 33 Sandwich Street in Plymouth, Massachusetts.

The oldest portion of this two-story wood-frame house was built by Jacob Mitchell (son of Pilgrim Experience Mitchell) in 1667, and purchased by Jabez Howland, son of Mayflower passengers John Howland and Elizabeth Tilley Howland, two of the original Pilgrims. The Jabez Howland House was owned as a private residence until 1915. Extensive restoration of the property took place in the 1940s to return it to its 17th-century appearance. The house was added to the National Register of Historic Places in 1974.

The Pilgrim John Howland Society owns and operates the house as a historic house museum that has been restored and decorated with 17th-century period furnishings. The house is open for tours from mid-June through the end of October.

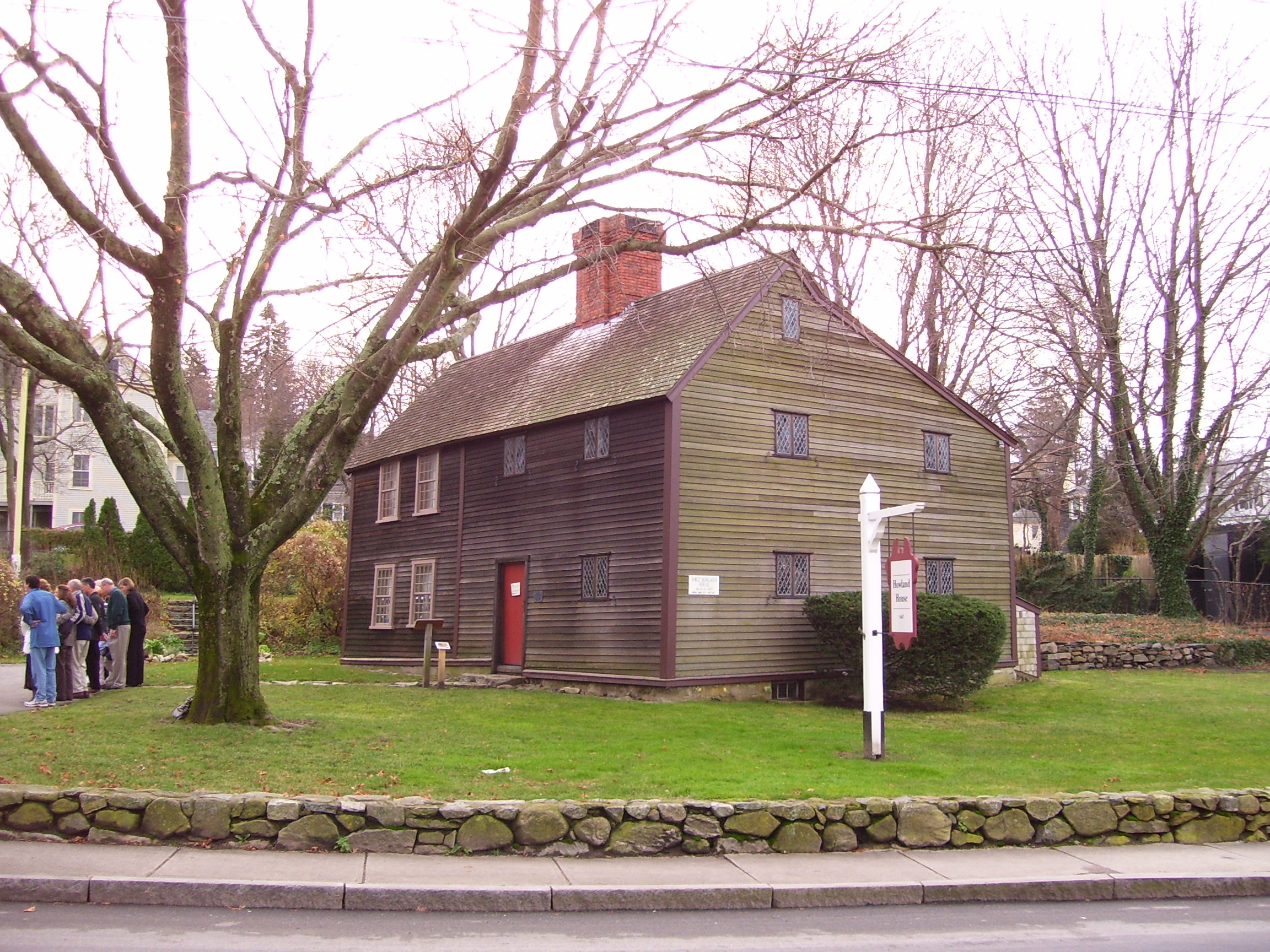
Howland House on Thanksgiving 2009

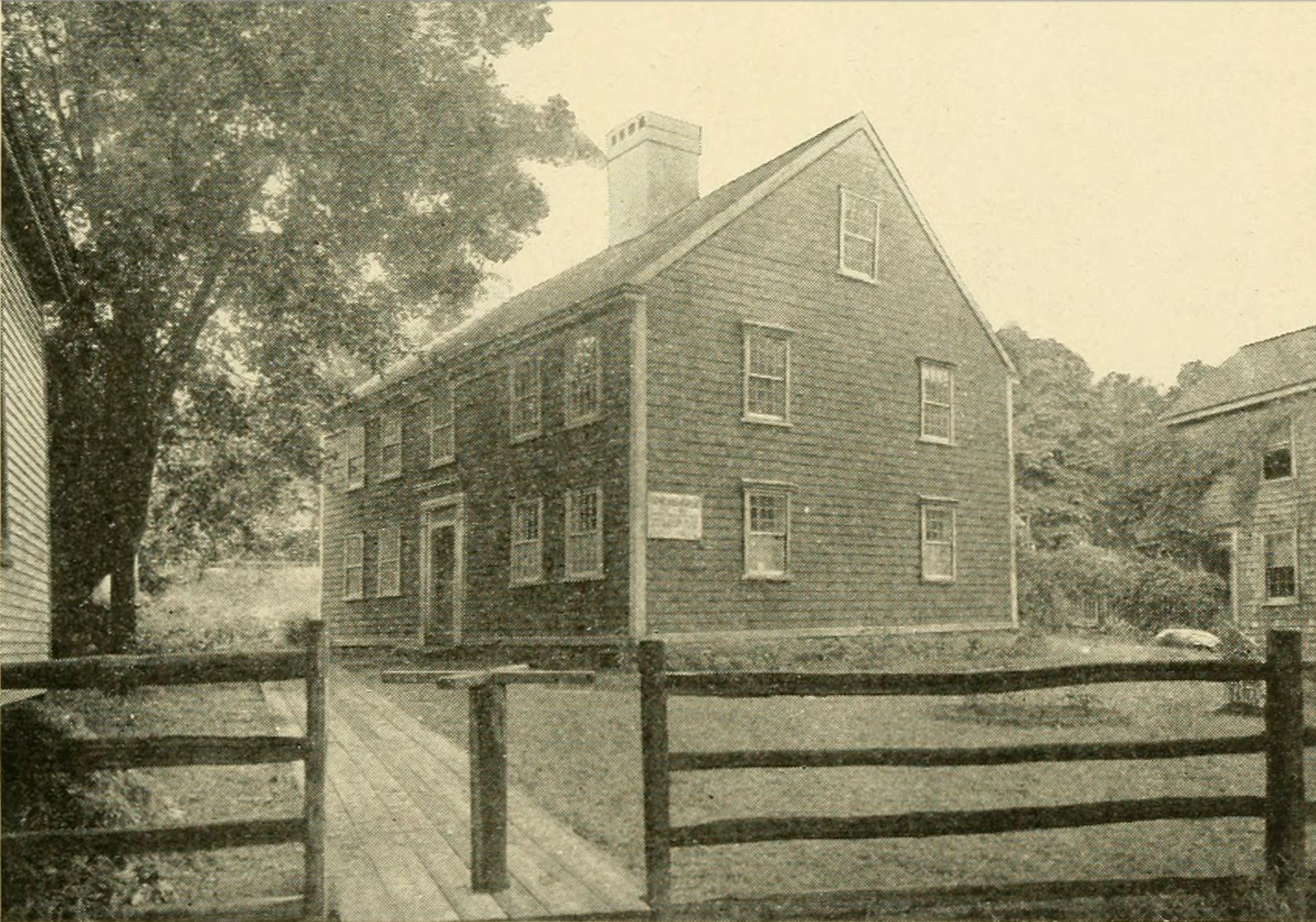
ca. 1921 photo of the Howland House before an addition was added to the rear of the house

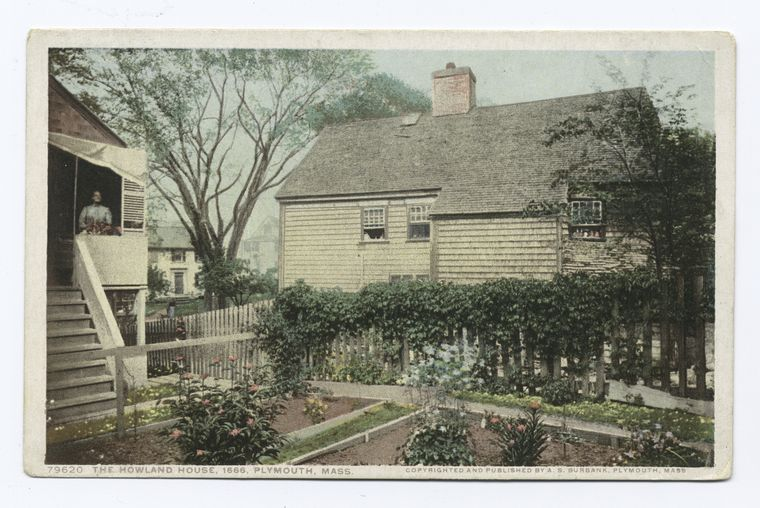
Early postcard of Howland House

== See also ==
- National Register of Historic Places listings in Plymouth County, Massachusetts
- List of the oldest buildings in Massachusetts
