= John Tilley (Mayflower passenger) =

Mayflower passenger

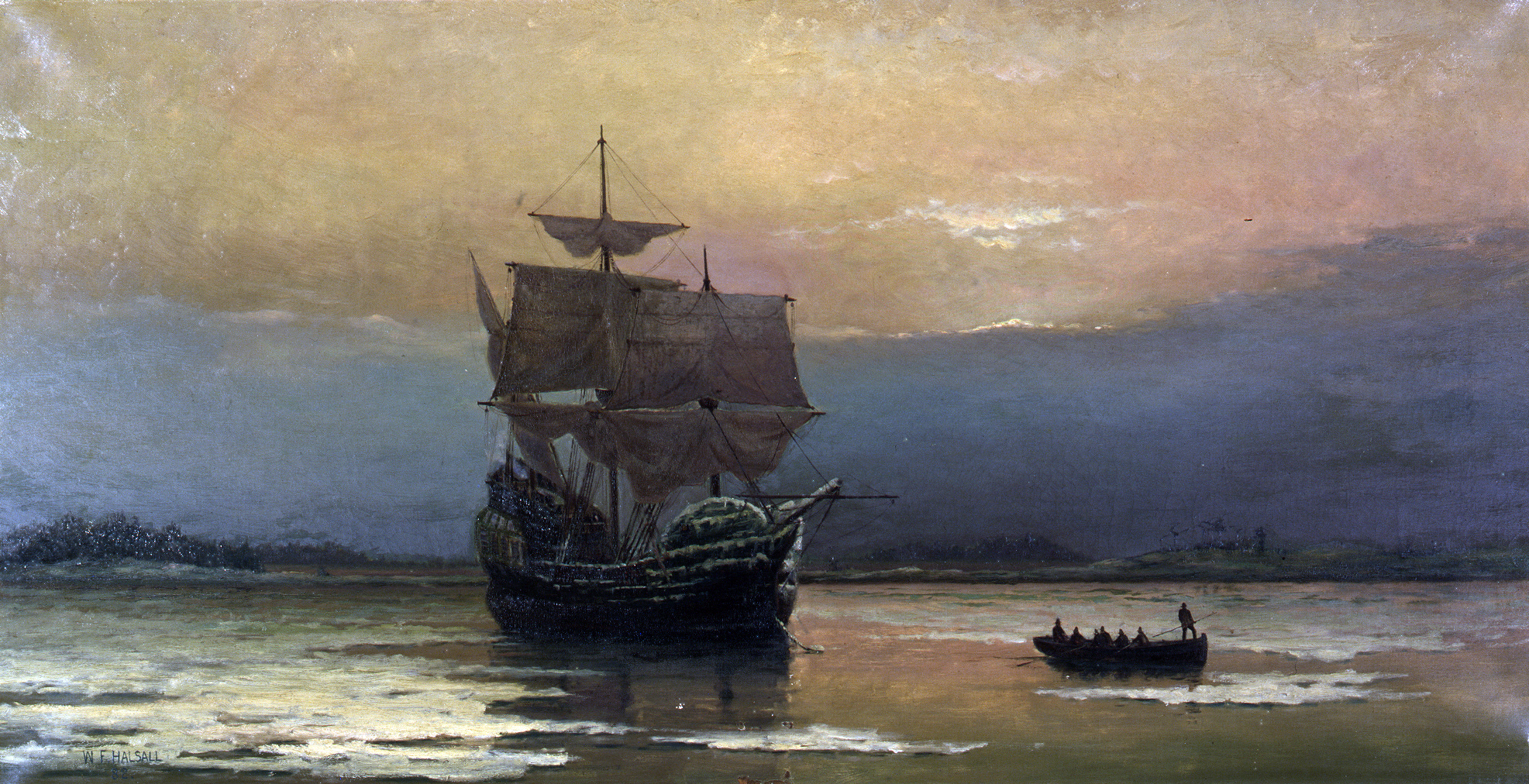
Mayflower in Plymouth Harbor by William Halsall (1882)

John Tilley (c. 1571 – winter of 1620/21) and his family were passengers on the historic 1620 voyage of the Mayflower. He was a signatory to the Mayflower Compact, and died with his wife in the first Pilgrim winter in the New World.

== Life in England ==
John Tilley was baptized on 19 December 1571 at Henlow in Bedfordshire, England. He was the eldest child of Robert Tilley and his wife Elizabeth. John had a younger brother, Edward, who also came on the Mayflower with his wife. John Tilley, his brother Edward and their wives all perished that first winter in the New World.

There are few records of John Tilley's life in England. His name appears in the will of George Clarke of Henlow, dated 22 September 1607, which notes that Thomas Kirke, then residing with Tilley, owed money to him. There is a record of a John Tilley, yeoman, residing at Wooton, Bedfordshire, who made a disposition on 7 April 1613 with his age stated as 40 years, which would probably make him the Mayflower passenger of that name.

Additionally, October 1617 Robert Tilley was apprenticed by his father John Tilley to Bedford tailor John Jones for eight years. (This information was also printed in The Howland Quarterly Howland Quarterly v71 #1 Mar 2006, “The Tilley’s of England and New England: Part 1” by Gail Ann Adams.)

Robert Tilly son of John and Joan was baptized 25 Nov 1604 in Henlow. Nearby Bedford was the residence of Joan Rogers Hawkins, Robert’s half sister (from his mother Joan’s first marriage). Joan Rogers married Edward Hawkins in St Paul church in Bedford 27 Jun 1620. Robert married Edward’s sister Mary at the same church in 27 Jun 1632.

It has been suggested that John Tilley moved at some point prior to 1620 to Leiden, Netherlands with the Pilgrims (or “saints” as Plymouth Governor William Bradford later referred to them). This is called into question if he arranged an apprenticeship for his son in Bedfordshire in Oct 1617. It’s possible that Robert aged 12 was living with a guardian in Oct 1617 or perhaps John travelled back from Leiden to arrange the apprenticeship.

There is evidence that Edward Tilley, John’s brother, agreed to take on an apprentice for five years in Leiden 25 Apr 1618. This apprentice did not travel on the Speedwell or Mayflower, so perhaps the agreement was set aside.

If John Tilley was not with Pilgrims in Leiden, then he would have been one of Bradford's "strangers" who joined the expedition in Southampton where the Mayflower met up with the Speedwell in July 1620. (The Speedwell having left Leiden 22 July with Pilgrims on-board. It was abandoned at Plymouth on 27 August after multiple attempts to repair leaks failed and the ship was deemed not safe to make the crossing.)

There is little information about the lives of John Tilley and his wife Joan. John Tilley was documented as a member of the Leiden Separatist congregation as well as his brother Edward. Edward's ward Henry Samson may also have been a member.

== On the Mayflower and in the New World ==
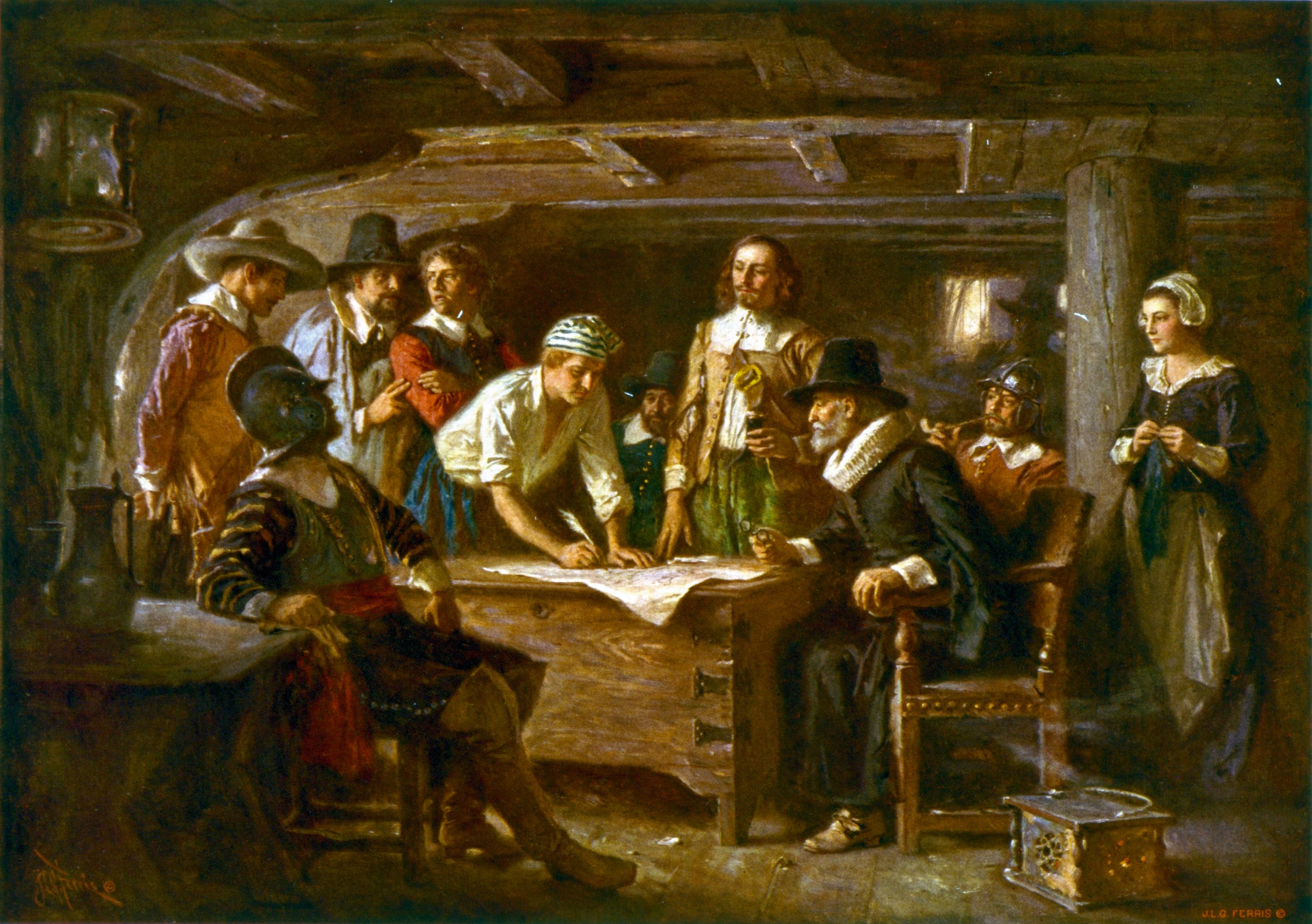
Signing the Mayflower Compact 1620, a painting by Jean Leon Gerome Ferris 1899

Per William Bradford's later recollection of this family on the Mayflower: "John Tillie, and his wife; and Elizabeth, their daughter."

The Mayflower departed Plymouth, England on 6/16 September 1620. The small, 100-foot ship had 102 passengers and a crew of about 30–40 in extremely cramped conditions. By the second month out, the ship was being buffeted by strong westerly gales, causing the ship's timbers to be badly shaken with caulking failing to keep out sea water, and with passengers, even in their berths, lying wet and ill. This, combined with a lack of proper rations and unsanitary conditions for several months, attributed to what would be fatal for many, especially the majority of women and children. On the way there were two deaths, a crew member and a passenger, but the worst was yet to come after arriving at their destination when, in the space of several months, almost half the passengers perished in cold, harsh, unfamiliar New England winter.

On 9/19 November 1620, after about three months at sea, including a month of delays in England, they spotted land, which was the Cape Cod Hook, now called Provincetown Harbor. After several days of trying to get south to their planned destination of the Colony of Virginia, strong winter seas forced them to return to the harbor at Cape Cod hook, where they anchored on 11/21 November. The Mayflower Compact was signed that day. John Tilley was a signatory to the Mayflower Compact, as was his brother, Edward.

== In the New World ==
Both John Tilley and his brother Edward were involved in the early exploring expeditions of the Cape Cod area in November and December 1620, with both suffering the effects of being ill-clad and wet in freezing temperatures. It may be that they died from the effects of the exploration weather.

One such extensive exploration in which the John and Edward Tilley are named as having taken part began on Wednesday, 6 December 1620 in freezing weather using the ship's shallop – a light, shallow-water boat with oars and sails navigated by two pilots and crewed by a master gunner and two sailors. The Pilgrims on board for this expedition, in addition to the Tilley's, were John Howland, Stephen Hopkins and his servant Edward Doty. Senior members on the expedition included John Carver, William Bradford, militia captain Myles Standish and Edward Winslow. The number of persons on this exploration was less than half of a prior expedition due to many having been felled by illness. As was recorded: "...very cold and hard weather... in which time two were sick... the gunner also sick unto death.." This exploration would not turn out well for the English in their first encounter with Indians as they found that slow-firing muskets were no match for rapid-fire arrows. This Indian challenge to the Pilgrims was later known as the "First Encounter."

John Tilley and his wife Joan both died the first winter, as did his brother Edward and his wife Ann. The only Tilley surviving from the Mayflower was John's thirteen-year-old daughter, Elizabeth, who went on to marry John Howland and raise a large family.

== Family and children ==
John Tilley married Joan (Hurst) Rogers, widow of Thomas Rogers (no relation to the Mayflower passenger of that name) on 20 September 1596 at Henlow in Bedfordshire. Joan Hurst was the younger daughter of William Hurst, and was baptized on 13 March 1567/8 at Henlow making her a little older than John. Joan came to the marriage with a daughter Joan, born of her marriage to Thomas Rogers, whom she married on 18 June 1593. Joan was baptized 26 May 1594, and Rogers seems to have died shortly afterwards.

Child of Joan (Hurst) and Thomas Rogers

- Joan Rogers was baptized on 26 May 1594. There is no further record and she may have died young, likely sometime after her mother's 1596 marriage to John Tilley. Updated from Bedfordshire local parish records, Joan Rogers relocated to the county town of Bedford. Joan Rogers married Edward Hawkins 27 June 1620 in Bedford, Bedfordshire, England where they continued to live and raise a family.

Children of John and Joan Tilley – all baptized in Henlow, Bedfordshire

They had five children baptized in the parish of Henlow between 1597 and 1607. Of their children, only Elizabeth, baptized 30 August 1607, and who accompanied them on the Mayflower, is a known survivor. The fate of the others is unknown.

- Rose Tilley (1) was baptized on 23 October 1597 and may have died young. No further record.
- John Tilley was baptized on 26 August 1599, died 1636 in Saybrook, New Haven, Connecticut, British Colony
- Rose Tilley (2) was baptized on 28 February 1601/2 and may have died young. No further record.
- Robert Tilley was baptized on 25 November 1604 and may have died young. No further record. Updated from Bedfordshire local parish records, their son Robert Tilley and his half sister Joan Rogers from Joan Hurst‘s first marriage, relocated 13 miles from Henlow to Bedford, where Robert Tilley became a Tailor’s apprentice. Joan married Edward and Robert married Mary both from the same Hawkins family who came from Bedford.

Robert Tilley married Mary Hawkins (who was born in Bedford in 1605) on 1 November 1632 at St. Paul’s Church, Bedford, England. Their first child, Mary Tilley was baptized on 11 August 1633 in St. Mary’s parish Bedford, England. Robert Tilley died 8 November 1639 in Bedford, Bedfordshire, England.

- Elizabeth Tilley was baptized on 30 August 1607 and died in Swansea on 22 December 1687. She married John Howland in Plymouth Colony about 1624 and had ten children.

Elizabeth (Tilley) Howland's family is described in a later recollection of William Bradford: (Gov. Carver's) "..servant John Howland, married the daughter of John Tillie, Elizabeth, and they are both now living, and have *10* children, now all living; and their eldest daughter hath *4* children. And their *2* daughter, one, all living; and other of their children marriageable. So *15* are come of them."

Their descendants survive up to the modern day.

== Death, burial and memorial of John Tilley and wife Joan ==
William Bradford described the demise of John and Joan Tilley: "John Tillie and his wife both died a little after they came ashore; and their daughter Elizabeth married with John Howland, and had issue as is before noted."

John and Joan Tilley died sometime in the winter of 1620/1621, possibly after coming ashore, per Bradford, to the new Plymouth settlement. They were buried in Cole's Hill Burial Ground in Plymouth, most likely in unmarked graves as with so many who died in that first winter. Their names, along with others who perished that winter, are memorialized on the Pilgrim Memorial Tomb on Cole's Hill as "John Tilley and his wife."
