= John Howland =

Early English colonist in North America and Mayflower passenger

- Born: 1599; Fenstanton, England
- Died: February 23, 1673; Massachusetts
- Spouse: Elizabeth Tilley
- Children: 10
- Relatives: John Tilley (father-in-law)

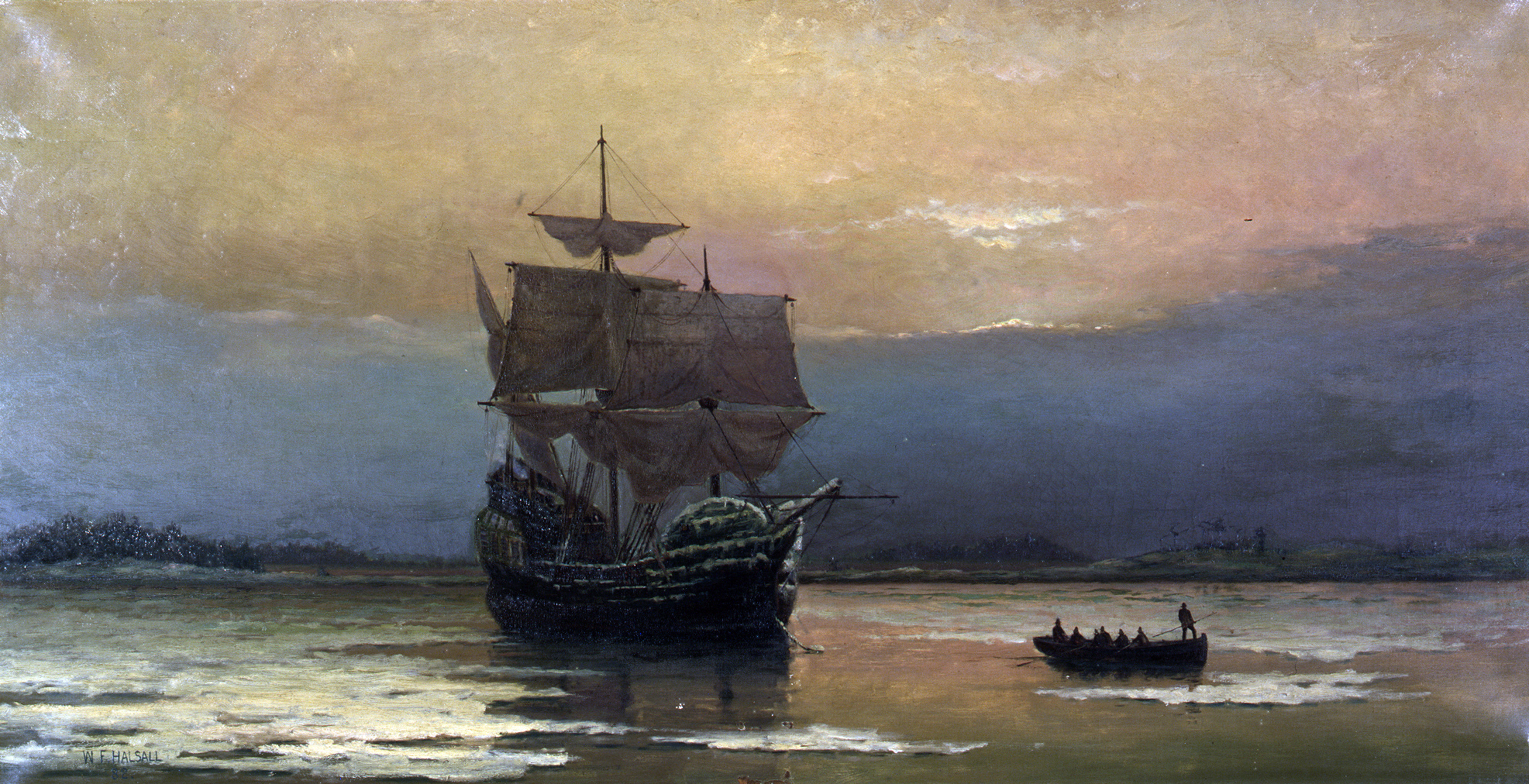
Mayflower in Plymouth Harbor by William Halsall (1882).

John Howland (c. 1599 – February 23, 1673) was an English indentured servant who accompanied the English Separatists and other passengers when they left England on the Mayflower to settle in Plymouth Colony. In later years, he was an executive assistant and personal secretary to Governor John Carver.

In 1620 he signed the Mayflower Compact and helped found the colony. During his service to Governor Carver in 1621, Howland assisted in the making of a treaty with the Sachem Massasoit of the Wampanoag. In 1626, he was a freeman and one of eight settlers who agreed to assume the colony's debt to its investors in exchange for a monopoly on the fur trade. He was elected deputy to the Plymouth General Court in 1641 and held the position until 1655, and again in 1658.

== English origins ==
John Howland was born in Fenstanton, Huntingdonshire, England, around 1592. He was the son of Margaret and Henry Howland, and the brother of Henry and Arthur Howland, who emigrated later from England to Marshfield, Massachusetts. Although Henry and Arthur Howland were Quakers, John himself held to the original faith of the Separatist Pilgrims.

== Speedwell and Mayflower ==
William Bradford, who was the governor of Plymouth Colony for many years, wrote in Of Plymouth Plantation that Howland was a man-servant of John Carver. Carver was the deacon of the Separatists church while the group resided in Leiden, Netherlands. At the time the Leiden congregation left the Netherlands on the Speedwell, Carver was in England securing investments, gathering other potential passengers, and chartering the Mayflower for the journey to North America. Howland may have accompanied Carver's household from Leiden when the Speedwell left Delfshaven for Southampton, England, in July 1620. The Separatists planned to travel to the New World on the Speedwell and the Mayflower. The Speedwell proved to be unseaworthy, and thus most of the passengers crowded onto the Mayflower.

== Voyage ==
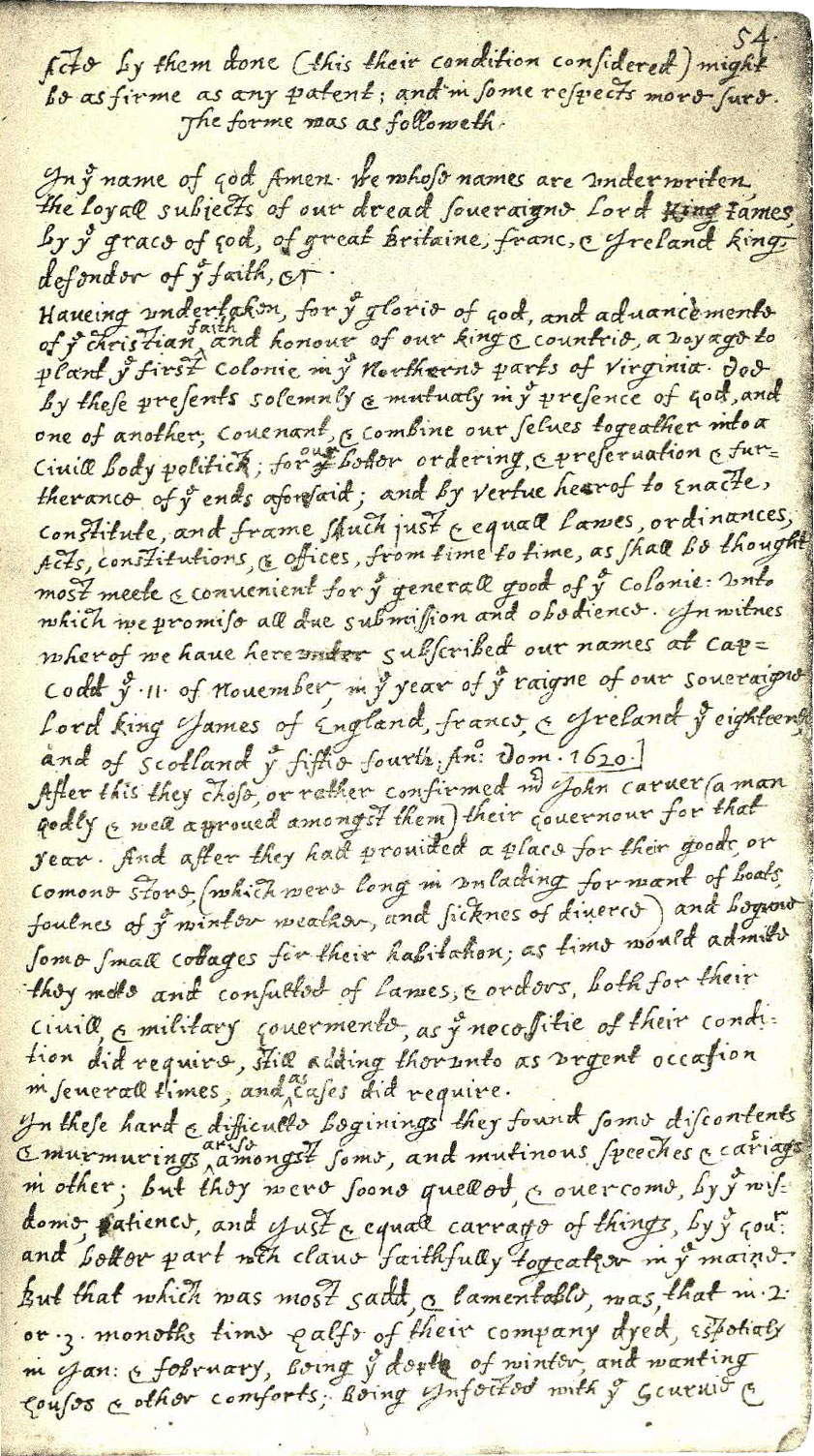
William Bradford's transcription of the Mayflower Compact

The Mayflower departed Plymouth, England, on September 6/16, 1620. The small, 100-foot ship had 102 passengers and a crew of about 30-40 in extremely cramped conditions. By the second month out, the ship was being buffeted by strong westerly gales, causing the ship's timbers to be badly shaken with caulking failing to keep out sea water, and with passengers, even in their berths, getting wet. This, combined with a lack of proper rations and unsanitary conditions for several months, contributed to sicknesses. On the way, there were two deaths, a crew member and a passenger. During the voyage there was a turbulent storm during which Howland fell overboard. He managed to grab a topsail halyard that was trailing in the water and was hauled back aboard safely. After arriving at their destination, in the space of several months, almost half the passengers perished in the cold, harsh, unfamiliar New England winter.

On November 9/19, 1620, after about three months at sea, including a month of delays in England, the crew and passengers spotted land, which was the Cape Cod Hook, now called Provincetown Harbor. After they struggled for several days to get south to their planned destination of the Colony of Virginia, strong winter seas forced them to return to the harbor at Cape Cod hook, where they anchored on November 11/21. On November 11, 1620, the Mayflower Compact was signed. Howland was the thirteenth of the 41 "principal" men to sign.

== Plymouth Colony ==
Coat of Arms of John Howland

The first winter in North America proved deadly for the Pilgrims as almost half their number perished. The Carver family, with whom Howland lived, survived the winter of 1620-21. However, the following spring, on an unusually hot day in April, Carver, according to William Bradford, came out of his cornfield feeling ill. He passed into a coma and "never spake more". His wife, Kathrine, died soon after her husband. The Carvers' only children had died while they lived in Leiden, and it is possible that Howland inherited their estate. In 1621, after Carver's death, Howland became a freeman. In 1624, he was considered the head of what was once the Carver household when he was granted an acre for each member of the household including himself, Elizabeth Tilley, Desire Minter, and a boy named William Latham.

In the several years after becoming a freeman, he served at various times as selectman, assistant and deputy governor, surveyor of highways, and as member of the fur committee. In 1626, he was asked to participate in assuming the colony's debt to its investors to enable the colony to pursue its own goals without the pressure to remit profits back to England. The "undertakers" paid the investors £1,800 to relinquish their claims on the land, and £2,400 for other debt. In return the group acquired a monopoly on the colony's fur trade for six years.

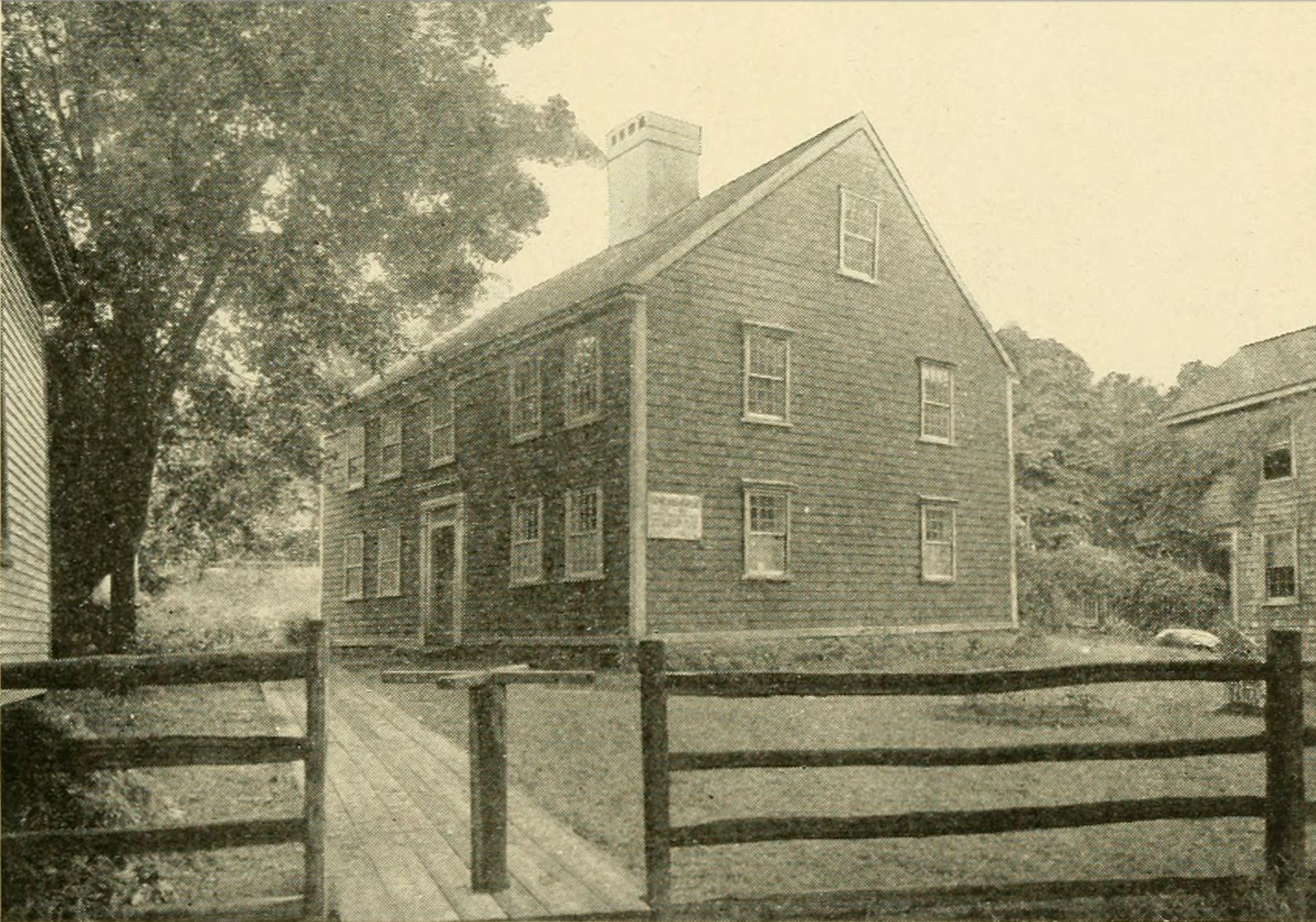
The Jabez Howland House in Plymouth, Massachusetts, built c. 1667 and photographed in 1921. Elizabeth (Tilley) Howland lived there for five years.

Howland accompanied Edward Winslow in the exploration of Kennebec River (in current day Maine), looking for possible fur trading sites and natural resources that the colony could exploit. He also led a team of men that built and operated a fur trading post there. While Howland was in charge of the colony's northerly trading post, an incident occurred there that Bradford described as "one of the saddest things that befell them." A group of traders from Piscataqua (present day Portsmouth, New Hampshire) led by a man named John Hocking, encroached on the trading ground granted to Plymouth by a patent, by sailing their bark up the river beyond their post. Howland warned Hocking to depart, but Hocking, brandishing a pistol and using foul language, refused. Howland ordered his men to approach the bark in a canoe and cut its cables setting it adrift. The Plymouth men managed to cut one cable when Hocking put his pistol to the head of Moses Talbot, one of Howland's men, and shot and killed him. Another of the Howland group shot Hocking to death in response.

In Plymouth, the Howlands lived on the north side of Leyden Street. They lived for a short time in Duxbury and then moved to Kingston where they had a farm on a piece of land referred to as Rocky Nook. The farm burned down in 1675 during King Philip's War. By that time, John had died and Elizabeth moved in with her son, Jabez.

Before moving to Rhode Island, Jabez Howland owned a home in Plymouth at 33 Sandwich Street. The house was built by Jacob Mitchell in about 1667 and was sold to Jabez Howland. John and Elizabeth had wintered in the house, and Elizabeth lived there from 1675, when the Rocky Nook farm was burned down, until Jabez sold it in 1680. It is the only house standing in Plymouth in which Mayflower passengers lived.

== Elizabeth Tilley ==
Until Bradford's Of Plymouth Plantation was discovered in 1856, it was presumed that Howland's wife, formerly Elizabeth Tilley, was the adopted daughter of the Carvers. (Her parents, uncle and aunt who came to the New World died of sickness during the first winter.) This error was even recorded on a gravestone that was erected for Howland on Burial Hill, in 1836. However, the Bradford journal revealed that she was, in fact, the daughter of John Tilley and his wife, Joan (Hurst). Elizabeth Tilley Howland was born in Henlow, Bedfordshire, England, where she was baptized in August, 1607. She and her parents were passengers on the Mayflower. John Tilley and his wife Joan both died the first winter as did his brother Edward Tilley and wife Ann. This left Elizabeth an orphan and so she was taken in by the Carver family. The Carvers died about a year later, and part of their estate was inherited by Howland, and Elizabeth became his ward. In 1623/24, she married Howland.

== Children ==
- Desire was born about 1624 and died in Barnstable October 13, 1683. She married John Gorham in Plymouth by 1644 and had eleven children. She was buried at Cobb's Hill Cemetery, Barnstable, Mass.
- John was born in Plymouth on February 24, 1626/7, and died in Barnstable after June 18, 1699. He married Mary Lee in Plymouth on October 26, 1651, and had ten children.
- Hope was born in Plymouth about 1629 and died in Barnstable on January 8, 1683. She married John Chipman about 1647 and had twelve children. She was buried at Lothrop Hill Cemetery, Barnstable, Mass.
- Elizabeth was born about 1631 and died in Oyster Bay, New York, in October 1683. She married John Dickinson (1602-1682). Their daughter, Mehitable (1667-1716), married Thomas Cheshire (1663-1715). Many of their descendants are still on Long Island, NY. Elizabeth had nine children.
- Lydia was born about 1633 and died in Swansea January 1710/11. She married James Brown(e) about 1655 and had four children.
- Hannah was born about 1637. She married Jonathan Bosworth in Swansea on July 6, 1661, and had nine children.
- Joseph was born about 1640 and died in Plymouth in January 1703/04. He married Elizabeth Southworth in Plymouth on December 7, 1664, and had nine children.
- Jabez was born about 1644 and died before February 21, 1711/12. He married Bethiah Thatcher by 1669 and had eleven children.
- Ruth was born about 1646 and died before October 1679. She married Thomas Cushman in Plymouth on November 17, 1664, and had three children.
- Isaac was born in Plymouth on November 15, 1649, and died in Middleboro on March 9, 1723/4. He married Elizabeth Vaughn by 1677 and had eight children. He was buried at Cemetery At The Green, Middleboro, Mass.

== Deaths and burials of John and Elizabeth ==
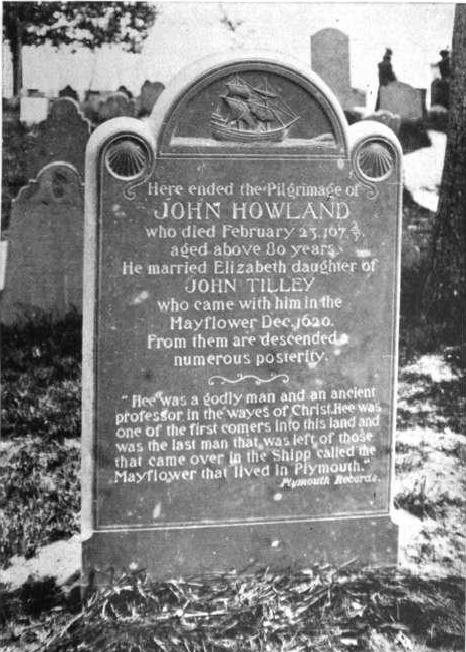
Howland's grave

John Howland died February 23, 1672/3 at the age of 80, having outlived most of the other male Mayflower passengers except George Soule (who died in 1679), John Alden (died 1687), and John Cooke (died 1695, and was the son of Mayflower passenger Francis Cooke). Richard More, one of the 'Mayflower Bastards' died after 19 March 1693/4, but before 20 April 1696, and was buried in Salem, Massachusetts. Howland is presumed to be buried on Burial Hill in Plymouth, Massachusetts.

Elizabeth Tilley outlived her husband by 15 years. She died December 21 or 22, 1687, in the home of her daughter, Lydia Brown, in Swansea, Massachusetts, and is buried in a section of that town which is now in East Providence, Rhode Island.

== Notable descendants ==
John and Elizabeth Howland founded one of the three largest Mayflower families and their descendants have been "associated largely with both the 'Boston Brahmins' and Harvard's 'intellectual aristocracy' of the nineteenth and twentieth centuries." Notable descendants include:

- Maude Adams (actress)
- Jane G. Austin (writer)
- Alec Baldwin (actor)
- Daniel Baldwin (actor)
- Stephen Baldwin (actor)
- William Baldwin (actor)
- Humphrey Bogart (actor)
- Phillips Brooks (writer)
- George H. W. Bush (41st U.S. President)
- George W. Bush (43rd U.S. President)
- Jeb Bush (former Florida Governor)
- Mary Chapin Carpenter (singer/song writer)
- Chevy Chase (actor)
- Florence Earle Coates (poet)
- James Marlan Coughtry (baseball player)
- James D. Dole (founder of Dole Pineapple Company)
- Sanford B. Dole (former Hawaii Governor)
- George Howard Earle III (American politician and diplomat)
- Tommy Edman (baseball player)
- Ralph Waldo Emerson (poet)
- Sam Ervin (U.S. Senator)
- Eville Gorham (environmentalist)
- John Gorham (Industrialist)
- Nathaniel Gorham (Continental Congress President)
- Eliza Howland (writer)
- Alfred Cornelius Howland (painter)
- Esther Allen Howland (creator of American Valentines)
- Charles P. Howland (football coach)
- John Howland (doctor) (founded First Pediatric Department in the U.S.)
- Albert Alexander Hyde (industrialist)
- Justice Robert Jackson (U.S. Supreme Court Justice)
- John Lithgow (actor)
- Christopher Lloyd (actor)
- Henry Cabot Lodge Jr. (U.S. Senator)
- Henry Wadsworth Longfellow (poet)
- William H. Macy (actor)
- Sarah Heath Palin (former Alaskan Governor)
- George C. Remey (U.S. Admiral)
- Franklin Delano Roosevelt (32nd U.S. President)
- Lillian Russell (actress)
- Salome Sellers (last verified person to be born in the 18th century)
- Joseph Smith Jr. (founder of the Church of Jesus Christ of Latter-day Saints)
- Dr. Benjamin Spock (writer)
- Justin Winsor (writer)

== Bibliography ==
- Philbrick, N. (2006). Mayflower: A Story of Courage, Community and War. New York: Viking. ISBN 9780670037605.
