= Humility Cooper =

Mayflower passenger

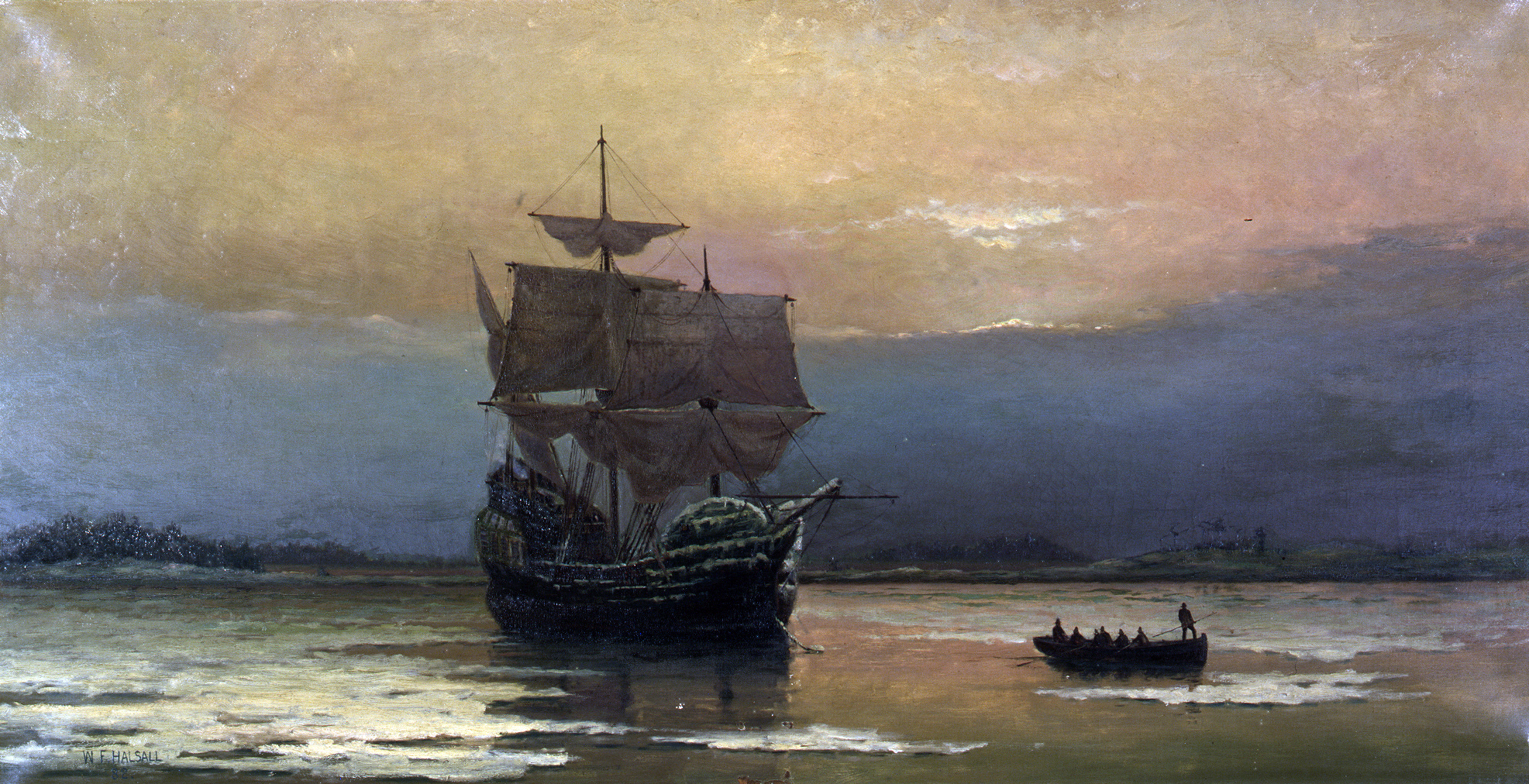
Mayflower in Plymouth Harbor by William Halsall (1882). This painting is in the Pilgrim Hall Museum, Plymouth, Massachusetts.

Humility Cooper (c. 1619 – prior to 1651), of Leiden, Holland, traveled in 1620 on the voyage of the ship Mayflower as a one-year-old female child in the company of the Edward Tilley family. Although Edward Tilley and his wife died the first winter in the Plymouth Colony, Cooper survived to live her young life in Plymouth Colony, returning to England possibly in her teen years. Her fate in England is unknown.

Cooper was born about 1619 in the Dutch Republic to Robert Cooper and his wife Joan (Gresham) of Henlow in Bedfordshire, England. They are known to have been in Leiden with English Separatists as in 1618 his name appears on a Leiden business agreement. He was a nephew of Edward Tilley's wife Ann, and with Humility's father Robert Cooper apparently being Ann's brother, who may have been a resident of Leiden, Holland at the time of Mayflower sailing.

== The Mayflower Voyage ==
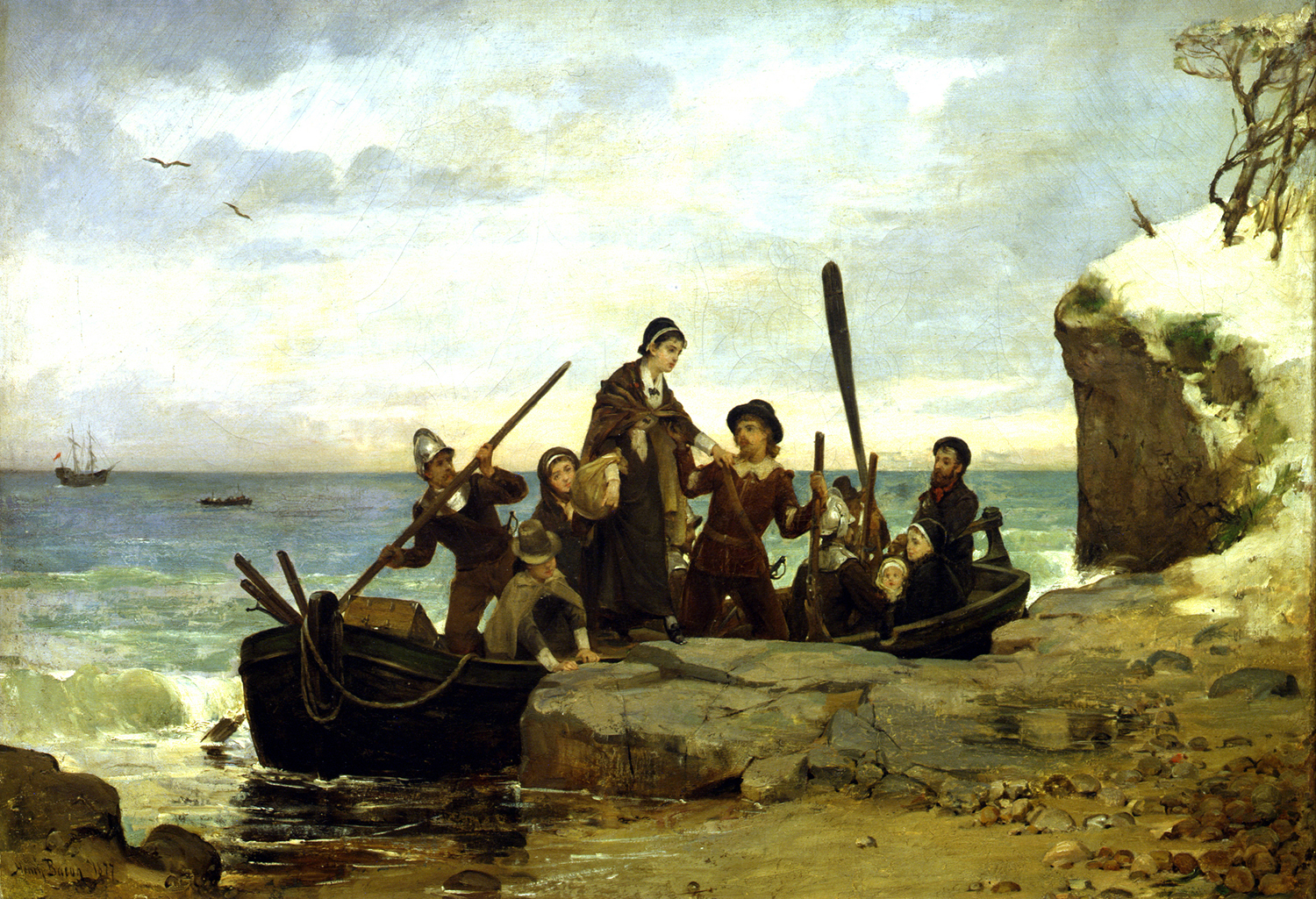
The Landing of the Pilgrims (1877) by Henry A. Bacon. This painting is in the Pilgrim Hall Museum, Plymouth, Massachusetts.

Edward and Ann Tilley came aboard the Mayflower without any children of their own, but in company with two young relatives of Ann's – her sixteen-year-old nephew Henry Samson and her one-year-old niece Humility Cooper. Both children had apparently been given over to the Tilleys in Leiden, but the reason those two children were with them has never been fully explained.

Per William Bradford's later recollection of this family: "Edward Tillie, and Ann, his wife; and *2* children that were their cossens, Henery Samson and Humility Coper."

Why Humility was in the custody of the Edward Tilleys is unknown – possibly her mother was deceased, and if she was an orphan, Ann Tilley, being childless, may have assumed custody in place of the child's mother.

The Mayflower departed Plymouth England on September 6/16, 1620, the small 100 foot ship having 102 passengers with about 30 crew members. The first month in the Atlantic, the seas were not severe, but by the second month the ship was being hit by strong north-Atlantic winter gales causing the ship to be badly shaken with water leaks from structural damage. There were two deaths, but this was just a precursor of what happened after their Cape Cod arrival, when almost half the company would die in the first winter.

On November 9/19, 1620, after about 3 months at sea, including a month of delays in England, they spotted land, which was Cape Cod. And after several days of trying to get south to their planned destination of the Colony of Virginia, strong winter seas forced them to return to the harbor at Cape Cod hook, where they anchored on November 11/21. The Mayflower Compact was signed that day. There were forty-one of the adult males, including the servants, who signed the Mayflower Compact on November 11, 1620.

== Life in New England ==
In the 1623 Division of Land, with the Winslow family, she was assigned one "aker" as "Humillitie Cooper" adjoining the property of Henry Samson.

In the 1627 Division of Cattle, she was in lot five with the Brewster family as "Humillyty Cooper."

== Return to England ==
From William Bradford's 1651 writing, she "was sent for into England" – by whom it is not known, possibly her father. Her return to England may have occurred sometime about 1638 or prior to that. She was baptized at the church of Holy Trinity Minories in London on March 17 or 19, 1638/9 with the record stating she had been born in Holland. Her baptism date would have made her age nineteen then and with the Tilleys on the Mayflower in 1620 she would have been about one year old.

== The Fate of Humility Cooper ==
From William Bradford's 1651 recollection, writing of the death of Humility Cooper: "……and the girle Humility, ther cousen (niece), was sent for into England, and dyed ther."

It is known that Humility Cooper returned to England unmarried some time after May 22, 1627, and if Bradford is correct in stating that she "dyed ther", she apparently died between the date of her baptism in 1638/9 and the time of Bradford's 1651 record. There is no further information about her.

== Sources ==
- Morrison, S. E. (1976). Of Plymouth Plantation, 1620-1647 by William Bradford, New York: Alfred Knopf.
