= Edward Tilley =

English separatist who was on board Mayflower

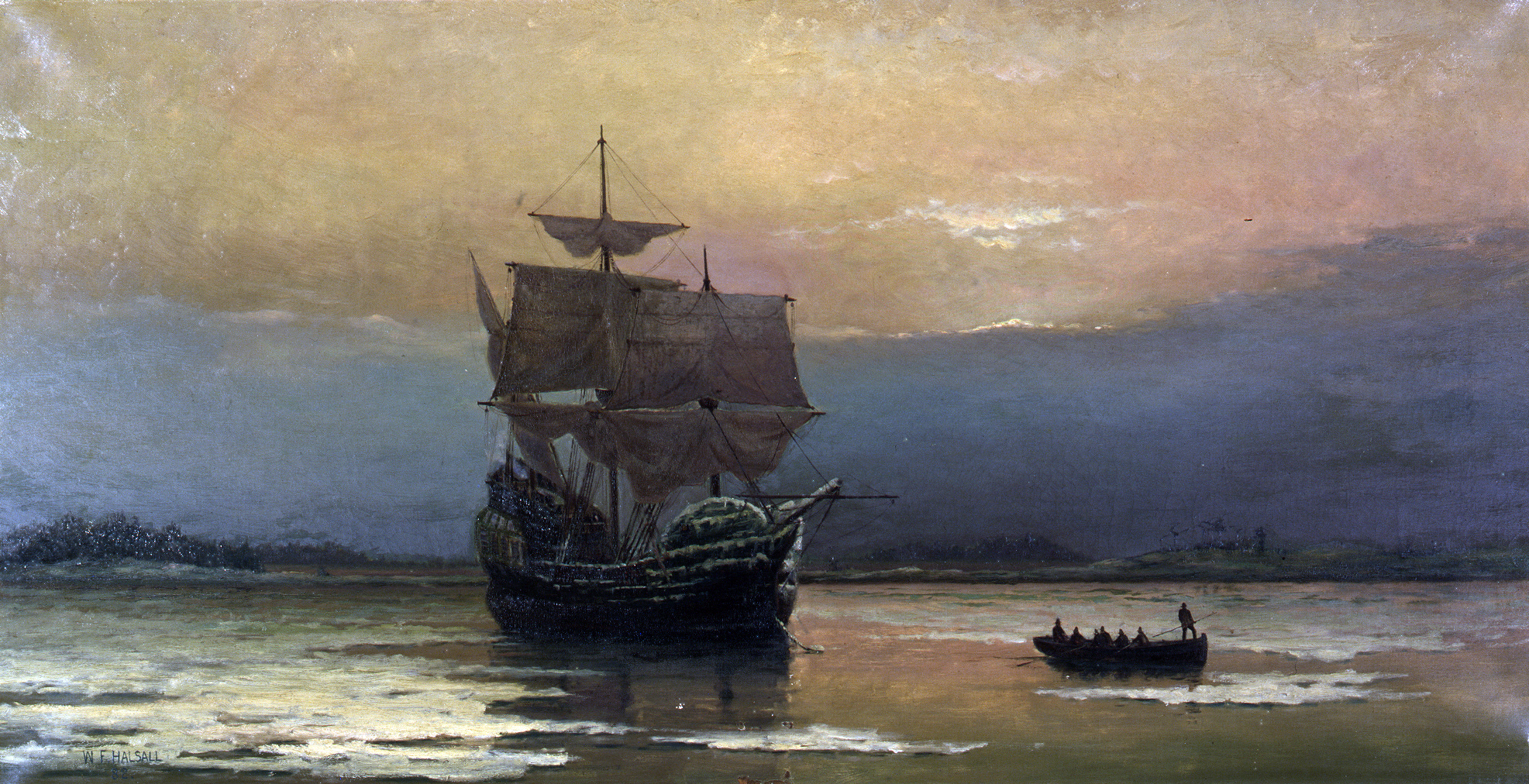
Mayflower in Plymouth Harbor by William Halsall (1882). This painting is in the Pilgrim Hall Museum, Plymouth, Massachusetts.

Edward Tilley (c. 1588 – c. winter of 1620/1621) traveled in 1620 on the historic voyage of the ship Mayflower as a Separatist member of the Leiden, Holland contingent. He was a signatory to the Mayflower Compact, and died with his wife in the first Pilgrim winter in the New World.

== In England ==
Edward Tilley was baptized in Henlow, Bedfordshire, England, on May 27, 1588. He was the son of Robert and Elizabeth Tilley.

Edward Tilley and Ann (or Agnes) Cooper married on June 20, 1614, in Henlow, Bedfordshire, she having been baptized there on November 7, 1585. As with his brother John, Edward married a woman a few years his senior, which was unusual for the time. Their pastor in Leiden, John Robinson, spoke against such marriages, stating it was best for men not to marry older women.

Edward Tilley and his wife likely resided in Henlow, Bedfordshire, until they emigrated to Holland a few years after their marriage.

== Life in Leiden ==
Shortly after their marriage Edward and his wife went to live in Leiden, Holland. They appeared in a 1616 Leiden record where he was reported to be a weaver as with a number of other Leiden Separatists, and future Mayflower passengers.

On 25 Apr 1618 Edward Tilley (Dutch: saijwercker geboortich uijt Engelant - "sailworker - or silkworker? - native of England") took on Robert Hagges (also a native of England) as an apprentice for five years according to Dutch records. Robert was over 21 and witnesses Jonathan Brewster, Robert Cooper and Thomas Blossom translated for Tilley and Hagges, who did not speak or understand Dutch very well.

There is an indication that Edward's brother John Tilley was also in Leiden along with Edward's ward Henry Samson.

== On the Mayflower ==
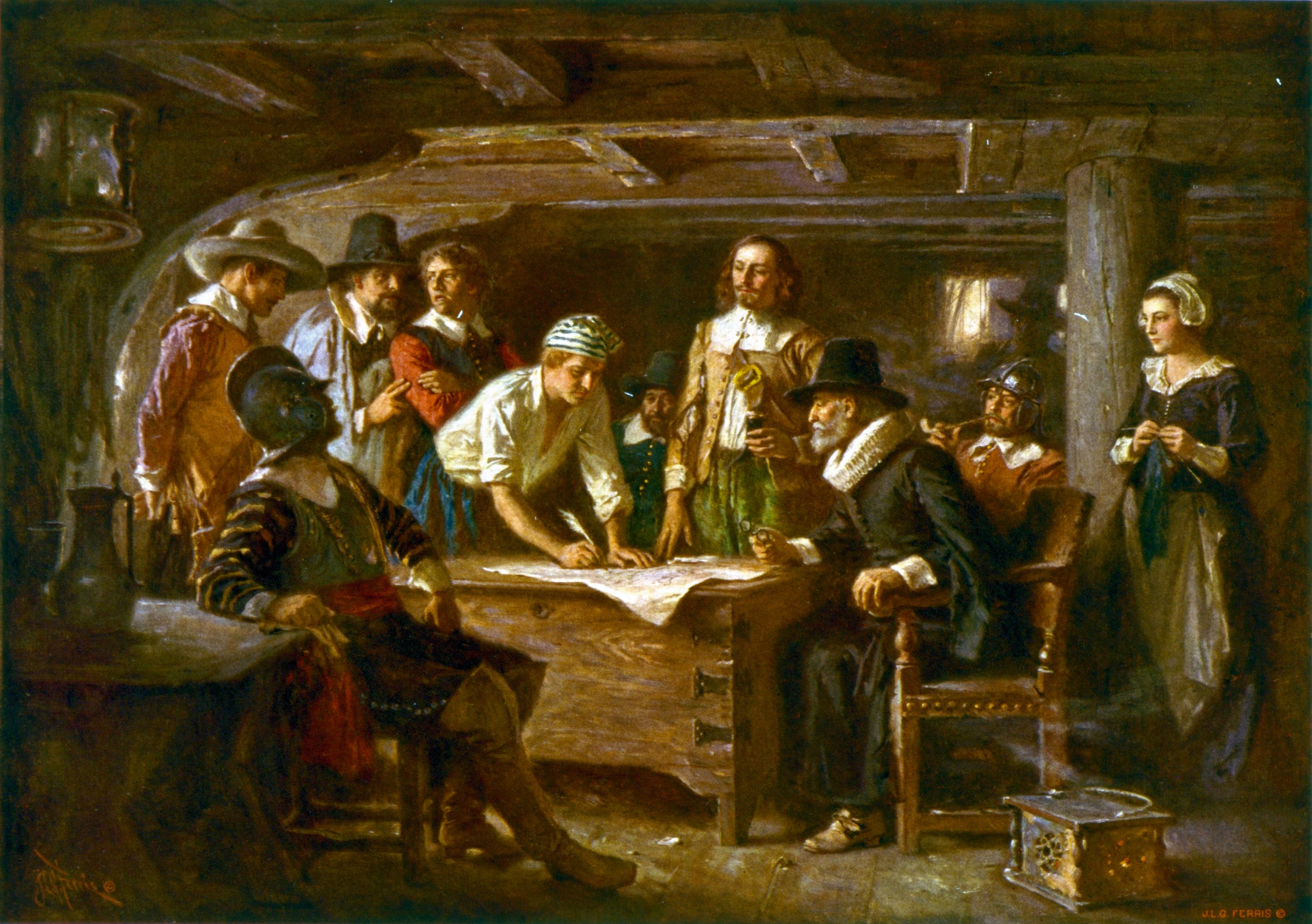
Signing the Mayflower Compact 1620, a painting by Jean Leon Gerome Ferris 1899

Edward and Ann Tilley came aboard the Mayflower without any children but oddly in company with two young relatives of Ann's – her sixteen-year-old nephew Henry Samson and her one-year-old niece Humility Cooper. The reason those two children were with them has not been fully explained.

Per William Bradford's later recollection of this family: "Edward Tillie, and Ann, his wife; and *2* children that were their cossens, Henery Samson and Humility Coper."

The Mayflower departed Plymouth, England, on September 6/16, 1620. The small, 100-foot ship had 102 passengers and a crew of about 30-40 in extremely cramped conditions. By the second month out, the ship was being buffeted by strong westerly gales, causing the ship's timbers to be badly shaken with caulking failing to keep out sea water, and with passengers, even in their berths, lying wet and ill. This, combined with a lack of proper rations and unsanitary conditions for several months, attributed to what would be fatal for many, especially the majority of women and children. On the way there were two deaths, a crew member and a passenger, but the worst was yet to come after arriving at their destination when, in the space of several months, almost half the passengers perished in cold, harsh, unfamiliar New England winter.

On November 9/19, 1620, after about three months at sea, including a month of delays in England, they spotted land, which was the Cape Cod Hook, now called Provincetown Harbor. After several days of trying to get south to their planned destination of the Colony of Virginia, strong winter seas forced them to return to the harbor at Cape Cod Hook, where they anchored on November 11/21. The Mayflower Compact was signed that day.

== In the New World ==
Upon arrival at Cape Cod, he was a signatory to the Mayflower Compact, signing as "Edward Tilly." He and his brother John both signed the Compact with the "Tilly" surname.

During the first weeks after arrival in the New World, Edward Tilley was an active participant, often with his brother John, in the various exploring parties of late November and early December 1620 while the Mayflower was anchored at Cape Cod.

The same day the Mayflower Compact was signed, November 11, 1620, about fifteen or sixteen men made their first landing ashore at the tip of Cape Cod for the purpose of making a short exploration. Although names were not recorded, this party may have included Edward Tilley as did future ones.

Several days later, on November 15, 1620, sixteen men, "every man his musket, sword and corslet (corselet – light body armor)" departed on a more thorough exploration of the Cape from its tip down through the Pamet River. Edward Tilley was named as a member of this exploring party, and specially made a participant with William Bradford and Stephen Hopkins to give "advice and counsel" to the militia captain, Myles Standish. They did encounter some Indians, who ran off into the woods to be followed by them for about ten miles, and later made camp for the night. They found some sand heaps where the Indians had buried seed corn for the following year and named the place Corn Hill. The Pilgrims made the decision to take the seed corn, saying that they would repay the owners when it could be ascertained who the seed corn owners were.

Later in November a second expedition with thirty-four men set out to do a more thorough exploration of the Pamet River and Corn Hill area and although the names of those who participated were not recorded, it might be presumed that Edward Tilley, and possibly his brother John, were also involved.

A third exploration of the Cape Cod area, with eighteen men, set out on December 6, 1620, but this time, many members of previous expeditions were not available, having been felled by illness. Both Edward Tilley and his brother John were among those specifically named in records of that expedition. The Pilgrims were ill-prepared for the bitter New England winter weather and encountered "very cold and hard weather…in which time two were very sick, and Edward Tilley had like to have sounded with a cold; the gunner was sick unto death, and so remained all that day, and the next night." The expedition lasted several days, during which time they were attacked by a group of Nauset Indians, but escaped without harm. That episode with the Indians would later be known as the First Encounter. The Pilgrims explored what would eventually become the Plymouth area, and finally after a month of searching, decided that it was there they would come ashore and build their settlement.

Exploring ill-clad in constant freezing weather with often wet clothing would take its toll on Edward Tilley who never did recover from the illness that he contracted just prior to the beginning of the third expedition. The exploring often involved wading from boat to shore through icy ocean water in freezing temperatures. Edward Tilley likely died in January, probably as a result of an initial cold which became pneumonia as time went along. Edward's wife Ann met her demise sometime following his death, but the two relatives of Ann in their care, Humility Cooper and Henry Samson, survived. The Tilleys had no recorded children of their own.

== Unaccompanied relatives traveling with Edward Tilley and his wife Anne ==
Edward Tilley and Ann (or Agnes) Cooper were married in Henlow, Bedfordshire, England, on June 20, 1614. She was a daughter of Edmund and Mary (Wyne) Cooper of Henlow, Bedfordshire.

Edward and Ann Tilley had no known children, but oddly were the caretakers of two children, Humility Cooper and Henry Samson, who were the niece and nephew of Ann, and had apparently been given over to the Tilleys in Leiden. The children survived in the care of other families after Edward and Ann Tilley died.

- Humility Cooper was born about 1619 in Holland to Robert Cooper and his wife Joan (Gresham). She was the niece of Edward Tilley's wife Ann, and apparent daughter of Ann's brother Robert Cooper, who may have been a resident of Leiden, Holland at the time of the Mayflower sailing. Why she was in custody of the Tilleys is unknown – possibly her mother was deceased, and if she was an orphan, Ann Tilley, being childless, may have assumed custody in place of the child's mother.

If William Bradford, writing in 1651, was correct about her death stating that she "dyed ther", Humility Cooper apparently died in England sometime between her baptism in 1638/9 and the time of Bradford’s 1651 record.

- Henry Samson (also known as Henry Sampson). Henry Samson was baptized in Henlow, Bedfordshire, on January 15, 1603/4, and was a son of James Samson and his wife Martha (Cooper), a sister of Ann, wife of Edward Tilley. Why Henry was in the custody of the Tilleys is unknown – he may have been apprenticed out to his uncle Edward Tilley. Henry's parents and siblings remained in Henlow, Bedfordshire.

It is unknown who cared for Henry after the deaths of Edward and Ann Tilley. Henry Samson became a freeman in Plymouth in 1635 and married Ann Plummer there on February 6, 1635/6. They had a total of nine children. Henry Samson made his will on December 24, 1684, and died on January 3, 1685, in Duxbury at age 81. He and his wife Anne were buried at Cole's Hill Burial Ground in Plymouth, Massachusetts.

== Death and burial of Edward and Ann Tilley ==
Per the 1651 recollection of William Bradford: "Edward Tillie and his wife both dyed soon after their arrival; and the girle Humility, their cousen, was sent for into England, and dyed ther. But the youth Henery Samson is still living, and is married, and hath *7* children."

Both Edward and his wife Ann were buried in Coles Hill Burial Ground in Plymouth likely sometime in January, 1621. They were probably buried in unmarked graves as with so many who died that winter. They are memorialized on the Pilgrim Memorial Tomb, Coles Hill, Plymouth as "Edward Tilley and Ann his wife."
