= William Bradford (governor) =

English Separatist leader (1590–1657)

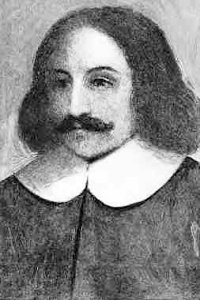
- A conjectural image of Bradford, produced as a postcard in 1904 by A.S. Burbank of Plymouth

2nd, 5th, 7th, 9th & 11th Governor of Plymouth Colony
- In office May 1621 – 1 January 1633
- Preceded by: John Carver
- Succeeded by: Edward Winslow
- In office 3 March 1635 – 1 March 1636
- Preceded by: Thomas Prence
- Succeeded by: Edward Winslow
- In office 7 March 1637 – 5 June 1638
- Preceded by: Edward Winslow
- Succeeded by: Thomas Prence
- In office 3 June 1639 – 5 June 1644
- Preceded by: Thomas Prence
- Succeeded by: Edward Winslow
- In office 4 June 1645 – 9 May 1657
- Preceded by: Edward Winslow
- Succeeded by: Thomas Prence

Commissioner of the United Colonies
- In office 1647–1647
- In office 1648–1648
- In office 1649–1649
- In office 1652–1652
- In office 1656–1656

Personal details
- Born: ca. 19 March 1590 Austerfield, West Riding of Yorkshire, England
- Died: 9 May 1657 (aged 67) Plymouth Colony
- Spouse(s): Dorothy May; Alice (Carpenter) Southworth
- Children: 4
- Occupation: Weaver, settler
- Profession: Colonial governor, judge
- Portfolio: Treasurer, chief magistrate

William Bradford (c. 19 March 1590 – 9 May 1657) was an English Pilgrim Separatist and Governor of Plymouth Colony, originally from the West Riding of Yorkshire in Northern England. He moved to Leiden in the Dutch Republic in order to escape persecution from King James I of England, and then emigrated to the Plymouth Colony on the Mayflower in 1620. He was a signatory to the Mayflower Compact and went on to serve as Governor of Plymouth Colony intermittently for about 30 years between 1621 and 1657. He served as a commissioner of the United Colonies of New England on multiple occasions and served twice as president. His journal Of Plymouth Plantation covered the years from 1620 to 1646 in Plymouth.

== Early life ==
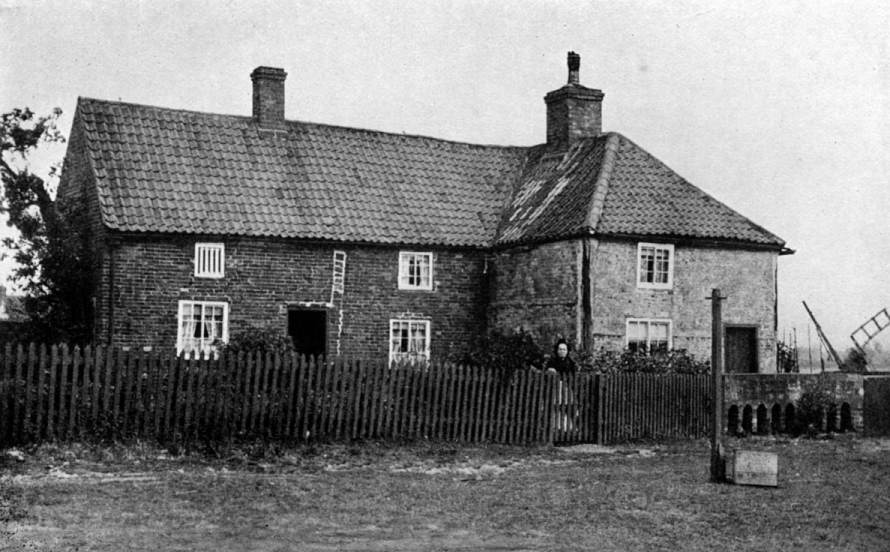
Manor House, Austerfield—presumed birthplace of William Bradford

William Bradford was born to Alice Hanson and William Bradford in Austerfield, West Riding of Yorkshire, and was baptized on 19 March 1590. The family possessed a large farm and were considered wealthy and influential in the small community. Bradford's grandfather was William Bradforthe, who had at least four children, including Bradford's father, and was probably of noble ancestry, according to researcher George J. Hill.

Bradford's childhood was marked by numerous deaths in the family. He was just over a year old when his father died. His mother remarried when he was four years old, and he was sent to live with his grandfather. His grandfather died two years later, and he returned to live with his mother and stepfather. His mother died a year later, in 1597, and Bradford thus became an orphan at the age of seven and was sent to live with two uncles.

His uncles wanted him to help on the farm, and he later noted in his journal that he suffered at that time from a "long sickness" and was unable to work. He instead turned to reading and became familiar with the Bible and classic works of literature. This is seen by some as a key factor in his intellectual curiosity and his eventual attraction to the Separatist branch of Puritan theology.

== Separatist congregation ==
When Bradford was 12 years old, a friend invited him to hear the Rev. Richard Clyfton preach 10 miles away in All Saints' Church, Babworth in Nottinghamshire. Clyfton believed that the Church of England ought to eliminate all vestiges of Roman Catholic practices, and that this would result in a purer Christian church. Bradford was inspired by his preaching and continued to attend his sermons, even though he was forbidden by his uncles. Bradford also met William Brewster, a bailiff and postmaster who lived at Scrooby manor, four miles from Austerfield. During frequent visits, Bradford borrowed books from him, and Brewster regaled him with stories of the efforts toward church reform taking place throughout England.

King James I came to the English throne in 1603, declaring that he would put an end to church reform movements and deal harshly with radical critics of the Church of England. By 1607, secret meetings were being held at Scrooby Manor and about 50 reform-minded individuals began to worship together, led by Richard Clyfton and the Rev. John Robinson. This group decided that reform of the Church of England was hopeless and they would sever all ties. Their weekly meetings eventually attracted the attention of the Archbishop of York, and many members of the congregation were arrested in 1607. Brewster was found guilty of being "disobedient in matters of religion" and was fined. Some members were imprisoned and others were watched "night and day", according to Bradford, by those loyal to the archbishop. Adding to their concerns, the Scrooby congregation learned that other dissenters in London had been imprisoned and left to starve.

The Scrooby congregation decided in 1607 to leave England unlawfully for the Dutch Republic, where religious freedom was permitted, and Bradford determined to go with them. The group encountered several major setbacks when trying to leave England, most notably their betrayal by an English sea captain who had agreed to carry them to the Netherlands, but instead turned them over to the authorities. Most of the congregation were imprisoned for a short time after this failed attempt, including Bradford. By the summer of 1608, however, they managed to escape England in small groups and relocate to Leiden in the Dutch Republic. Bradford was 18.

=== In Leiden and London ===
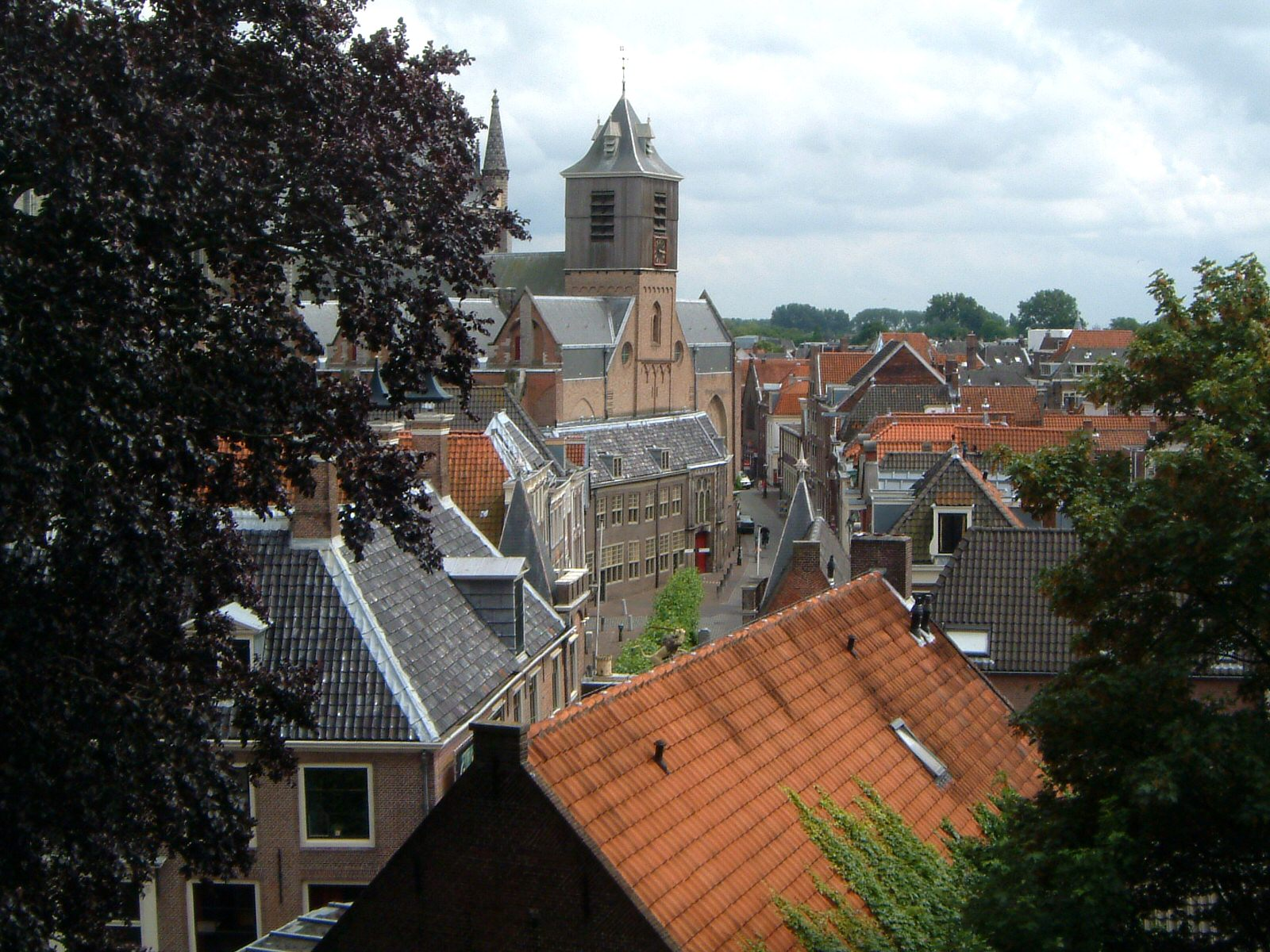
A modern view of the city of Leiden featuring the Hooglandse Kerk

Bradford arrived in Amsterdam in August 1608. He had no family with him and was taken in by the Brewster household. The Scrooby congregation had to work the lowest of jobs and to live in poor conditions, being foreigners and having spent most of their money in attempts to get to the Dutch Republic. After nine months, the group chose to relocate to the smaller city of Leiden.

Bradford continued to reside with the Brewster family in a poor Leiden neighborhood known as Stink Alley. Conditions changed dramatically for him when he turned 21 and was able to claim his family inheritance in 1611. He bought his own house, set up a workshop as a fustian weaver (weaver of heavy cotton cloth for men's clothing), and earned a reputable standing. In 1613, he married Dorothy May, the daughter of a well-off English couple living in Amsterdam. They were married in a civil service, as they could find no example of a religious service in the Scriptures. In 1617, they had their first child, named John.

In 1619, William Bradford sold his house in Leiden and appears in March 1620 tax records in London being taxed for personal property at the Duke's Place, Aldgate. Aldgate was an area of London known to be the residence of numerous Dutch merchants, as well as many religious dissenters. Some familiar Mayflower names of families living in the area included Allerton, Tilley, Sampson, and Hopkins.

One family in Aldgate played an important part in Bradford's life in America. Edward and Alice (Carpenter) Southworth and their two sons were residing at Heneage House, the Duke's Place, in Aldgate in 1620. Southworth was a highly respected leader of the Leiden group, but he died in 1621/22. His widow Alice emigrated to Plymouth Colony after Bradford's wife died, and they were married.

== Founding Plymouth Colony ==
=== Departure aboard the Speedwell ===
By 1617, the Scrooby congregation began to plan the establishment of their own colony in the Americas. The Separatists could practice religion as they pleased in the Dutch Republic, but they were troubled by the fact that their children were being influenced by Dutch customs and language, after nearly ten years in the Netherlands. Therefore, they commenced three years of difficult negotiations in England seeking permission to settle in the northern parts of the Colony of Virginia (which then extended north to the Hudson River). The colonists also struggled to negotiate terms with a group of financial backers in London known as the Merchant Adventurers. By July 1620, Robert Cushman and John Carver had made the necessary arrangements, and approximately fifty Separatists departed Delftshaven on board the Speedwell.

It was an emotional departure. Many families were split, as some Separatists stayed behind in the Netherlands, planning to make the voyage to the New World after the colony had been established. William and Dorothy Bradford left their three-year-old son John with Dorothy's parents in Amsterdam, possibly because he was too frail to make the voyage.

According to the arrangements made by Carver and Cushman, the Speedwell was to meet with the Mayflower off the coast of England and both were destined for the northern part of the Colony of Virginia. The Speedwell, however, proved to be not structurally sound enough to make the voyage, and some of the passengers were transferred aboard the Mayflower, making crowded conditions. Joining the Scrooby congregation were about 50 colonists who had been recruited by the Merchant Adventurers for their vocational skills, which would prove useful in establishing a colony. These passengers of the Mayflower, both Separatist and non-Separatist, are commonly referred to today as "Pilgrims." The term is derived from a passage in Bradford's journal, written years later, describing their departure from the Netherlands (itself an allusion to Hebrews 11:13 in the Bible):

...With mutual embraces and many tears, they took their leaves of one another, which proved to be the last leave to many of them ... but they knew they were pilgrims and looked not much on those things, but lifted their eyes to heaven, their dearest country and quieted their spirits ...

=== The Mayflower voyage ===
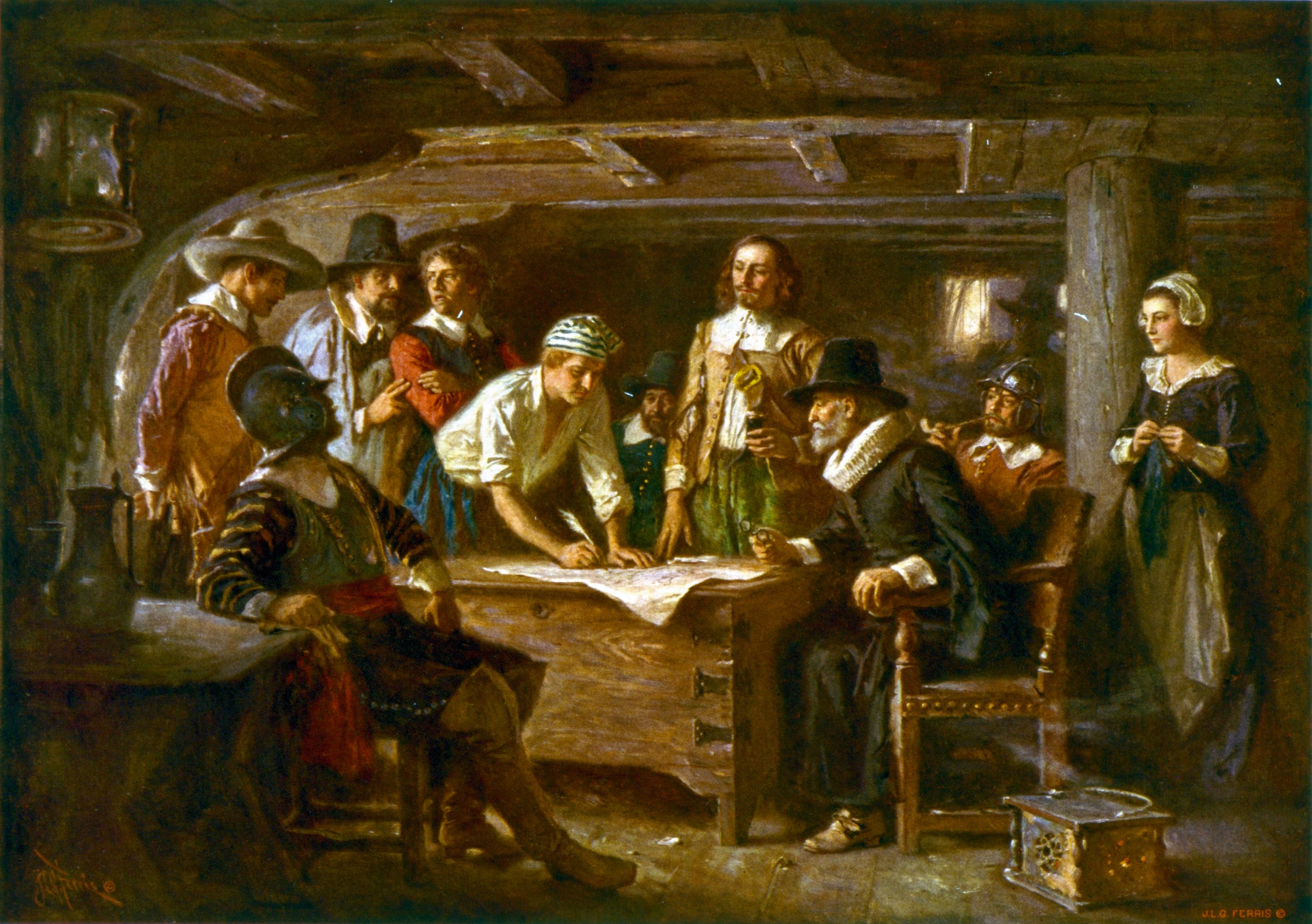
Signing the Mayflower Compact 1620, a painting by Jean Leon Gerome Ferris from 1899

The Mayflower departed Plymouth, England, on 6/16 September 1620. The 100-foot ship had 102 passengers and a crew of 30-40 in extremely cramped conditions. By the second month out, the ship was being buffeted by westerly gales, causing the ship's timbers to be badly shaken, with caulking failing to keep out sea water, and with passengers lying wet and ill, even in their berths. There were two deaths on the trip, a crew member and a passenger.

They spotted Cape Cod hook on 9/19 November 1620, after about a month of delays in England and two months at sea. They spent several days trying to get south to their planned destination of the Colony of Virginia, but strong winter seas forced them to return to the harbor at Cape Cod hook, now called Provincetown Harbor, where they anchored on 11/21 November 1620. The Mayflower Compact was signed that day, Bradford being one of the first to sign.

=== Anchored and first explorations at Plymouth Colony ===
Bradford had yet to assume any significant leadership role in the colony by the time that he was 30. The Mayflower anchored in Provincetown Harbor and he volunteered to be a member of the exploration parties searching for a place for settlement. In November and December, these parties made three separate ventures from the Mayflower on foot and by boat, finally locating Plymouth Harbor in mid-December and selecting that site for settlement.

During the first expedition on foot, Bradford got caught in a deer trap made by Indians and hauled nearly upside down. The third exploration departed from the Mayflower on 6 December 1620 when a group of men (including Bradford) located Plymouth Bay. A winter storm nearly sank their boat as they approached the bay, but they managed to land on Clark's Island, suffering from severe exposure to the cold and waves. During the ensuing days, they explored the bay and found a suitable place for settlement, now the site of downtown Plymouth, Massachusetts. The location featured a prominent hill ideal for a defensive fort. There were numerous brooks providing fresh water, and it had been the location of an Indian village known as Patuxet; therefore, much of the area had already been cleared for planting crops. The Patuxet tribe had been wiped out by plagues between 1616 and 1619, possibly as a result of contact with English fishermen or from contact with the French to the north. Bradford wrote that bones of the dead were clearly evident in many places.

=== Loss of first wife ===
When the exploring party made their way back on board, he learned of the death of his wife Dorothy. Dorothy (May) Bradford from Wisbech, Cambridgeshire, fell overboard off the deck of the Mayflower during his absence and drowned. William Bradford recorded her death in his journal.

=== Great sickness ===
The Mayflower arrived in Plymouth Bay on 20 December 1620. The settlers began building the colony's first house on 25 December (Christmas). Their efforts were slowed, however, when a widespread sickness struck the settlers. The sickness had begun on the ship. On 11 January 1621, Bradford was helping to build houses when he was suddenly struck with great pain in his hipbone and collapsed. He was taken to the "common house" (the only finished house built then) and it was feared that he would not last the night.

Bradford recovered, but many of the other settlers were not so fortunate. During the months of February and March 1621, sometimes two or three people died a day. By the end of the winter, half of the 100 settlers had died. In an attempt to hide their weakness from Native Americans who might be watching them, the settlers buried their dead in unmarked graves on Cole's Hill, often at night, and made efforts to conceal the burials.

During the epidemic, there were only a small number of men who remained healthy and bore the responsibility of caring for the sick. One of these was Captain Myles Standish, a soldier who had been hired by the settlers to coordinate the defense of the colony. Standish cared for Bradford during his illness and this was the beginning of a bond of friendship between the two men. Bradford was elected governor soon after Carver's death and, in that capacity, he worked closely with Standish. Bradford had no military experience and therefore came to rely on and trust the advice of Captain Myles Standish concerning military matters.

=== Relationship with Massasoit ===
On 16 March, the settlers had their first meeting with the American Indians in the region when Samoset walked into the village of Plymouth as a representative of Massasoit, the sachem of the Pokanokets. This soon led to a visit by Massasoit himself on 22 March, during which he signed a treaty with John Carver, Governor of Plymouth, which declared an alliance between the Pokanokets and Plymouth, requiring them to aid one another militarily in times of need.

Bradford recorded the language of the brief treaty in his journal. He soon became governor and the clause of the treaty that occupied much of his attention as governor pertained to mutual aid. It read, "If any did unjustly war against [Massasoit], we would aid him; if any did war against us, Massasoit should aid us." This agreement secured the colonists with a faithful ally in New England, though it resulted in tensions between the colonists and Massasoit's rivals, such as the Narragansetts and the Massachusetts.

=== Governor of Plymouth ===
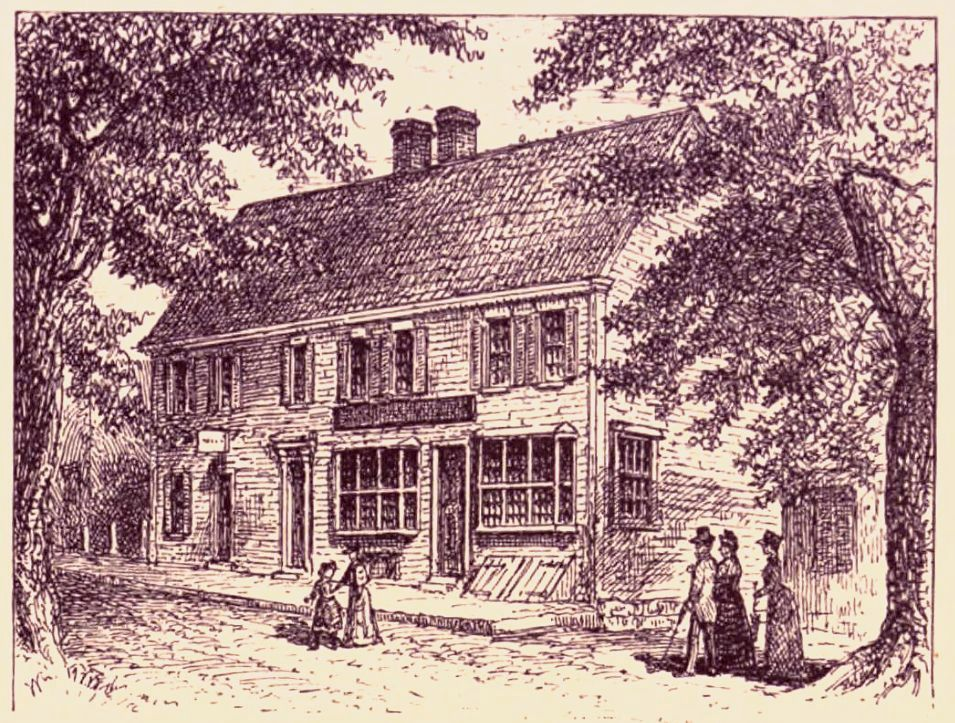
Governor Bradford's house in Plymouth

In April 1621, Governor Carver collapsed while working in the fields on a hot day. He died a few days later. The settlers of Plymouth then chose Bradford as the new governor, a position which he retained off and on for the rest of his life. The elected leadership of Plymouth Colony at first consisted of a governor and an assistant governor. The assistant governor for the first three years of the colony's history was Isaac Allerton. In 1624, the structure was changed to a governor and five assistants who were referred to as the "court of assistants," "magistrates," or the "governor's council." These men advised the governor and had the right to vote on important matters of governance, helping Bradford in guiding the growth of the colony and its improvised government. Assistants during the early years of the colony included Thomas Prence, Stephen Hopkins, John Alden, and John Howland.

Governors of Plymouth Colony

Governors of Plymouth Colony
Dates	Governor
1620	John Carver
1621–1632	William Bradford
1633	Edward Winslow
1634	Thomas Prence
1635	William Bradford
1636	Edward Winslow
1637	William Bradford
1638	Thomas Prence
1639–1643	William Bradford
1644	Edward Winslow
1645–1656	William Bradford
1657–1672	Thomas Prence
1673–1679	Josiah Winslow
1680–1692	Thomas Hinckley

== Literary works ==
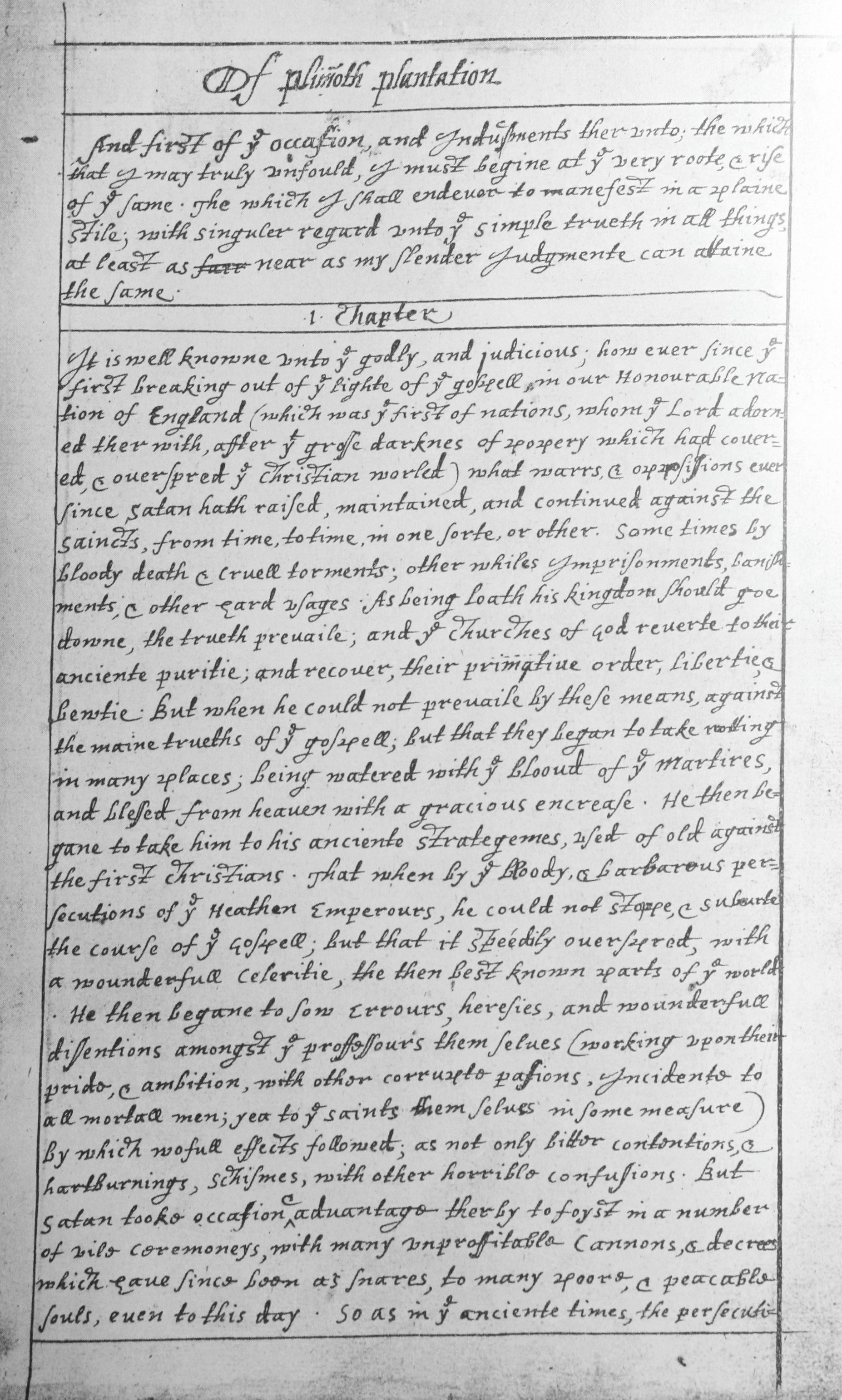
The front page of the Bradford journal

William Bradford's most well-known work by far is Of Plymouth Plantation. It is a detailed history in journal form about the founding of the Plymouth Colony and the lives of the colonists from 1621 to 1646, a detailed account of his experiences and observations. The first part of the work was written in 1630; toward the end of his life, he updated it to provide "the account of the colony's struggles and achievements through the year 1646." Bradford drew deep parallels between everyday life and the events of the Bible. As Philip Gould writes, "Bradford hoped to demonstrate the workings of divine providence for the edification of future generations."

In 1888, Charles F. Richardson referred to Bradford as a "forerunner of literature" and "a story-teller of considerable power." Moses Coit Tyler called him "the father of American history." Many American authors have cited his work in their writings; for example, Cotton Mather referred to it in Magnalia Christi Americana and Thomas Prince referred to it in A Chronological History of New-England in the Form of Annals. Even today it is considered a valuable piece of American literature, included in anthologies and studied in literature and history classes. It has been called an American classic and the preeminent work of art in seventeenth-century New England."

The Of Plymouth Plantation manuscript disappeared by 1780, "presumably stolen by a British soldier during the British occupation of Boston"; it reappeared in Fulham, London, in the Bishop of London's library at Fulham Palace. A long debate ensued as to the rightful home for the manuscript. United States Senator George Frisbie Hoar and others made multiple attempts to have it returned, and the British finally relinquished it to Massachusetts on 26 May 1897.

Bradford's journal also contributed to the book Mourt's Relation, which was written in part by Edward Winslow and published in England in 1622. It was intended to inform Europeans about the conditions surrounding the American colonists at the Plymouth Colony. Bradford's Dialogues are a collection of fictional conversations between the old and new generations, between "younge men" and "Ancient men".

== Family ==
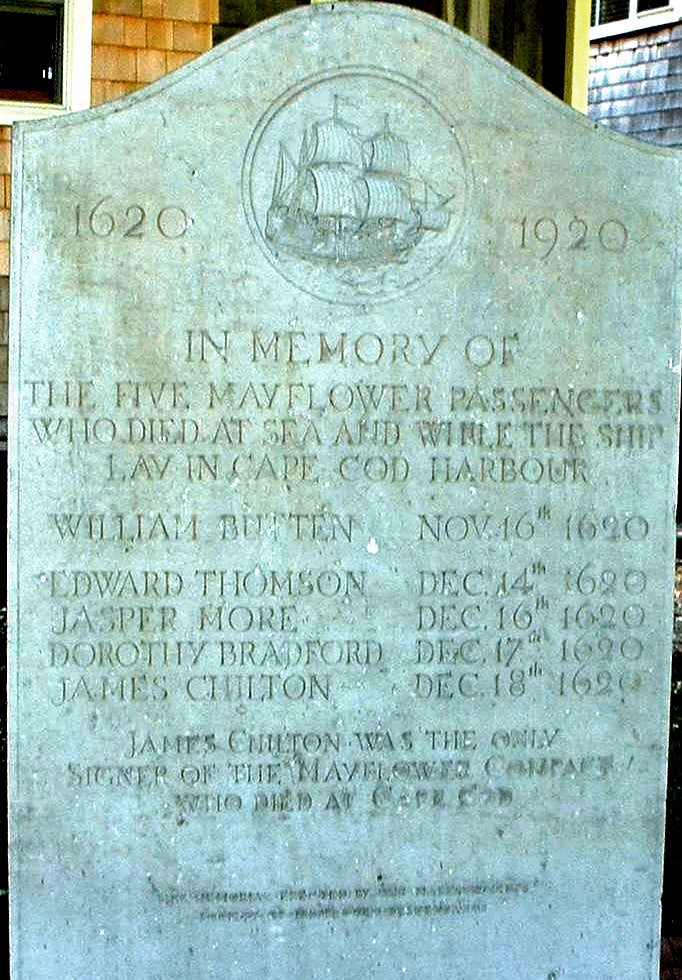
Provincetown, Massachusetts memorial to Pilgrims who died at sea or on board the Mayflower in Cape Cod Harbor in November/December 1620

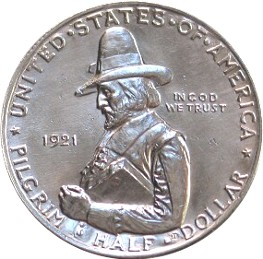
Bradford is honored on the 1920-21 U.S. commemorative Pilgrim Tercentenary half dollar, designed by Cyrus Dallin

William Bradford married:

1. Dorothy May in Amsterdam, Netherlands, on 10 December 1613. Their marriage record indicates that she was 16 years old and was from Wisbech in Cambridgeshire. The record also notes a Henry May, who may have been her father. William and Dorothy had one son.
  Her death and memorial: On 17 December 1620, Dorothy fell from the deck of the Mayflower into the icy waters of Cape Cod Harbor, where the ship was anchored, and drowned. Her husband was with others on an expedition ashore and only learned of her death on his return to the Mayflower.
  She was one of four Mayflower passengers who died between 14 and 18 December 1620, including Edward Thomson, Jasper More (age 7 years), and James Chilton. William Butten was the first to die in Provincetown Harbor, dying on 16 November. They are all commemorated on two cenotaphs in Provincetown, one at Winthrop Street Cemetery and one at the Mayflower Passengers Who Died at Sea Memorial. Their burial places ashore are unknown and may have been unmarked in those very early days after the Mayflower landing.
  The death of these five persons was just a precursor of the deaths to come, consuming about half the Mayflower company in that first bitter winter of 1620–1621.
2. Alice (Carpenter) Southworth, age about 32, in Plymouth on 14 August 1623. She had arrived on the ship Anne some weeks earlier. Alice was the widow of Edward Southworth. She was one of five daughters of Alexander and Priscilla Carpenter of Wrington, co. Somerset in England, all being of Leiden about 1600. Alice brought two sons to the marriage: Constant, born about 1612, and Thomas, born about 1617. Alice and William had three children. She died in Plymouth on 26 March 1670 and was buried on Burial Hill in Plymouth near her husband's stone.

Child of William and Dorothy Bradford:

- John was born in Leiden, Holland, about 1617. He married Martha Bourne by 1650 but had no known children. He died in Norwich, Connecticut some time before 21 September 1676.

Children of William and Alice Bradford:

- William was born on 17 June 1624 in Plymouth and died there on 20 February 1703/04. He was buried on Burial Hill in Plymouth.

William married:
1. Alice Richard after 23 April 1650 and had ten children. She died in Plymouth on 12 December 1671.
2. Sarah (____) Griswold about 1674 and had one son.
3. Mary (Atwood) Holmes about 1676 and had four children.

- Mercy was born before 22 May 1627 and may have been dead before her father's 1657 will, as she was not mentioned. She married Benjamin Vermayes on 21 December 1648 in Plymouth but had no known children.
- Joseph was born about 1630. He married Jael Hobart on 25 May 1664 in Hingham and had three children. He died in Plymouth on 10 July 1715.

== Will, death and burial ==
Bradford died on May 9, 1657 and was buried on Burial Hill in Plymouth, where a cenotaph was erected in his memory. The estate inventory was taken on May 22, 1657.

Bradford was the focal point of the American Experience episode "The Pilgrims". He was played by Roger Rees.

== See also ==
- List of descendants of William Bradford (Plymouth governor)
