= Henry Samson =

Mayflower passenger

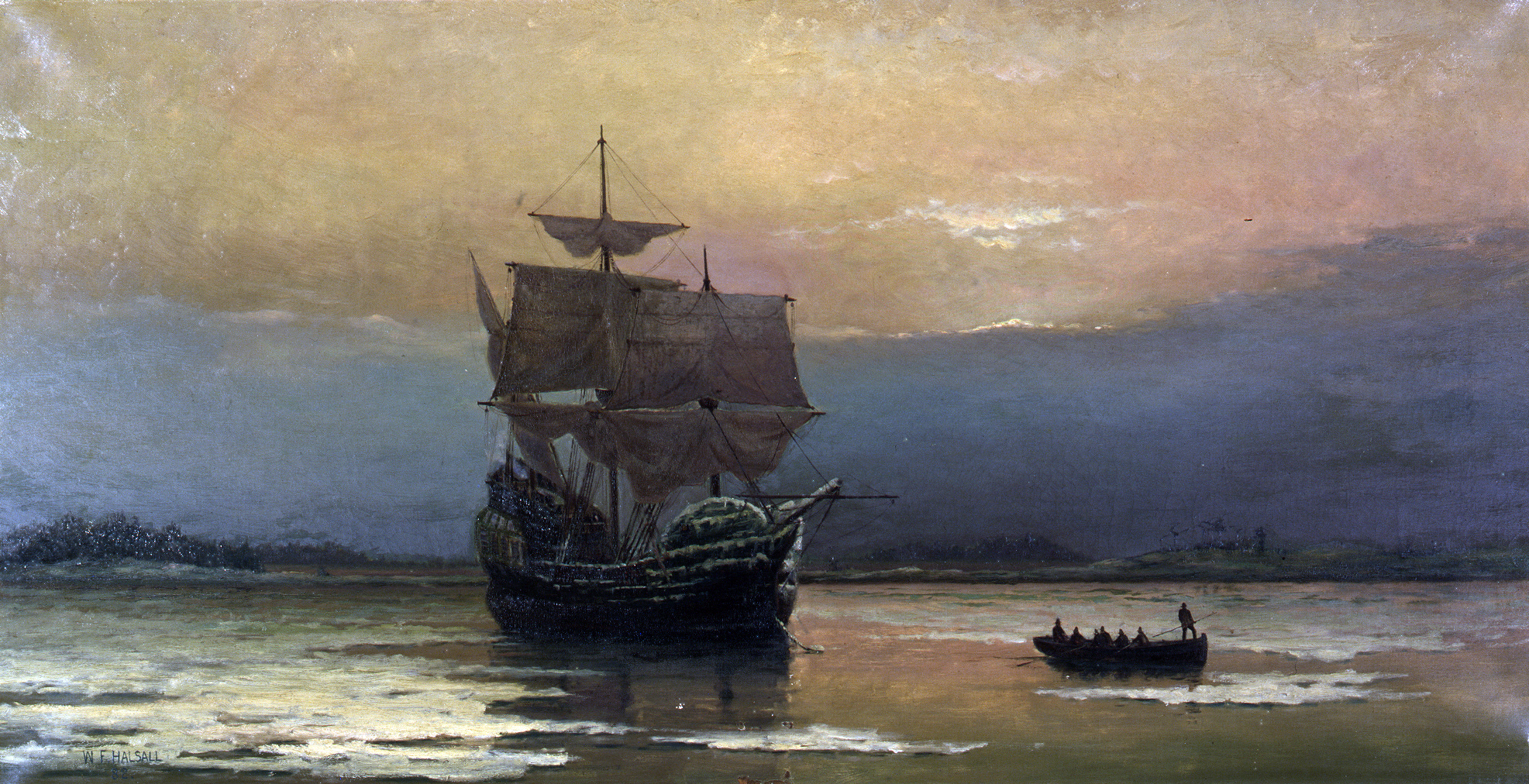
Mayflower in Plymouth Harbor by William Halsall (1882). This painting is in the Pilgrim Hall Museum, Plymouth, Massachusetts.

Henry Samson (c. 1603 – 1684) In 1620 Henry Samson travelled as a member of the Edward Tilley family on the historic voyage of the Pilgrim ship Mayflower. The Tilleys died in the first winter but Henry Samson survived to live a long, fulfilling life in Plymouth Colony.

== Life in England ==
Henry Samson was baptized in Henlow, Bedford, England on January 15, 1603/04. He was a son of James Samson and his wife Martha (Cooper), a sister of Ann, wife of Edward Tilley. Henry was noted in his father's 1638 will and was bequeathed five pounds.

== Life in Leiden ==
Shortly after their marriage Edward Tilley and his wife went to live in Leiden, Holland. They appear in a 1616 Leiden record where he was reported to be a weaver as with a number of other Leiden Separatists, and future Mayflower passengers. There is an indication that Edward's brother John Tilley was also in Leiden along with Edward's ward Henry Samson.

== Voyage on the Mayflower ==
Henry Samson, age about sixteen, boarded the ship Mayflower as a nephew of the Edward Tilley family, along with his cousin, one year old Humility Cooper. Why Henry was in the custody of the Tilleys is unknown – it is possible he may have been apprenticed out to his uncle Edward Tilley. The reason that Humility and Henry were given over to the care of the Tilleys, apparently in Leiden, has never been fully explained. Henry's parents and siblings remained in Henlow, Bedfordshire.

Per William Bradford's later recollection of this family: "Edward Tillie, and Ann, his wife; and *2* children that were their cossens, Henery Samson and Humility Coper."

The small, 100-foot ship had 102 passengers and a crew of about 30−40 in extremely cramped conditions. By the second month out, the ship was being buffeted by strong westerly gales, causing the ship's timbers to be badly shaken with caulking failing to keep out sea water, and with passengers, even in their berths, lying wet and ill. This, combined with a lack of proper rations and unsanitary conditions for several months, attributed to what would be fatal for many, especially the majority of women and children. On the way there were two deaths, a crew member and a passenger, but the worst was yet to come after arriving at their destination when, in the space of several months, almost half the passengers perished in cold, harsh, unfamiliar New England winter.

On November 9/19, 1620, after about 3 months at sea, including a month of delays in England, they spotted land, which was the Cape Cod Hook, now called Provincetown Harbor. After several days of trying to get south to their planned destination of the Colony of Virginia, strong winter seas forced them to return to the harbour at Cape Cod hook, where they anchored on November 11/21. The Mayflower Compact was signed that day.

== Life in Plymouth Colony ==
At the death of the Edward Tilleys in the winter of 1620/1621, Henry Samson and Humility Cooper were given over to the care of others – it being uncertain what family that was. Records do show Henry's name with that of the Edward Winslow family in the 1623 Division of Land, adjoining land of Humility Cooper, and with the William Brewster family in the 1627 Division of Cattle.

In 1626 Henry Samson was a member of the Purchasers, which were a Plymouth Colony investment group in company with former members of the "Merchant Adventurers" London organization. In that agreement, he was listed as "Henry Sampson."

Over the years, Henry Samson received generous land grants becoming a Freeman before March 7, 1636/7.

Henry was a volunteer in the Pequot War of 1637, but the war ended before the Colony could get its troops organized.

On January 1, 1637/38, Henry and Ann were granted land in Duxbury next to Henry Howland.

In April 1640, Henry was granted additional land that had formerly been common land. Starting in the 1640s, Samson began many years of public-service duties. He served on six juries between 1641 and 1663 and twelve petty juries between 1644 and 1670.

In 1648 he was an arbiter, a surveyor in 1649 and in 1661, a constable for Duxbury. Between 1638 and 1654 Samson and his wife had nine children and in 1665 and 1667 he was allowed by the Plymouth Court to seek out land for his children.

Sometime after 1668, Henry and his wife sold some of their land in Nemasket and would also sell off some of his Dartmouth properties in 1682 and 1684.

In 1669 he served on a coroner's jury assembled by John Alden.

== Family ==
Coat of Arms of Henry Samson

Henry Samson married Anne Plummer on February 6, 1635/6 in Plymouth and between about 1638 and about 1654 he and his wife had nine children.

Children of Henry and Anne Samson:

- Stephen Lincoln was born about 1638 and died before January 31, 1714/5 in Duxbury. He married Elizabeth Sprague by 1686 and had eight children.
- John was born 1645, and died 1712. He married Sarah Pease in 1667 in Beverly, Essex, Massachusetts. They had six children.
- Elizabeth was born about 1642 and died after November 23, 1711. She married Robert Sprout by 1662 and had eight children.
- James was born in 1637 and died between January 10, 1715/6 and July 7, 1718. He married Hannah Whitman by 1679 and had seven children.
- Hannah was born 1641 and was still living on January 23, 1681. She married Josiah Holmes on March 20, 1665/6 in Duxbury and had six children. She died in 1715
- Sarah was born about 1648. She married John Hanmer by 1682 and had four sons and three daughters.
- Mary was born 1647 and died before 1686. She married John Summers by 1684 but had no recorded children.
- Dorcas was born about 1652 and died before July 29, 1695. She married Thomas Bonney by 1684 and had three children.
- Caleb was born 1656 and died after July 9, 1735. He was buried at Myles Standish Burial Ground in Duxbury, Mass.

He married:
1. Mercy Standish by 1686 and had nine children. She died between May 17, 1722 and January 30, 1728/9. She was a grand-daughter of Mayflower passengers Myles Standish and John Alden.
2. Rebecca (Bartlett) (Bradford) Stanford on January 30, 1728/9 in Duxbury. She died in 1741.

== Will of Henry Samson ==
Henry Samson made his will December 24, 1684, which was sworn March 5, 1685. In the will he named his sons Stephen, John, James and Caleb, dividing his remaining Dartmouth land holdings between Stephen, John and James. Small sums were given to son Caleb and daughter Elizabeth, wife of Robert Sprout; Hannah, wife of Josias Holmes; Sarah, the wife of John Hanmer; Mary, wife of John Summers; and Dorcas, wife of Thomas Bonney.

== Death and burial of Henry Samson and his wife ==
Henry Samson died on December 24, 1684, in Duxbury. His wife Ann had predeceased him, dying between December 24, 1668, and December 24, 1684. Both were buried in Cole's Hill Burial Ground in Plymouth, Plymouth Colony.
