= George Morton (Pilgrim Father) =

English Puritan Separatist (c. 1585–1624)

George Morton or George Mourt (c. 1585 – 1624) was an English Puritan Separatist. He was the publisher of, and perhaps helped write, the first account in Great Britain of the founding of Plymouth Colony, called Mourt's Relation.

== Biography ==
Coat of Arms of George Morton

He was from Bawtry, West Riding of Yorkshire, England, and member of the Scrooby Congregation of separatists who eventually became the Mayflower Pilgrims. Morton, who had moved to Leyden, Holland with the congregation, stayed behind when the first settlers left for Plymouth, Massachusetts. He continued to orchestrate business affairs in Europe and London for their cause—presumably arranging for the 1622 publication of, and perhaps helping write, Mourt's Relation. In 1623 Morton himself emigrated on the ship Anne to Plymouth Colony with his wife Juliana Carpenter and her sister, Alice Southworth, who was to become the second wife of Governor William Bradford.

George Morton died in 1624, the year after he arrived in Plymouth. His widow Juliana then married Manasseh Kempton, who had also arrived in 1623 on the Anne. After Morton's death, Governor Bradford took a keen interest in helping to raise the Morton children.

== Family ==
George Morton's children by his only wife, Juliana, were:

- Nathaniel Morton, m. Plymouth 25 December 1635 Lydia Cooper.(Plymouth Public Schools named Nathaniel Morton Elementary School after him.)
- Patience Morton, m. by 1633 John Faunce. (She was the mother of famed and last Plymouth church elder, Thomas Faunce.)
- John Morton, m. by 1649 Lettice (______).
- Sarah Morton, m. 20 December 1644 George Bonum. (Sarah is the subject of the children's book Sarah Morton's Day by Kate Waters.)
- Ephraim Morton, m. Plymouth 18 Nov. 1644 Ann Cooper. (Their oldest child was the second George Morton (1645–1727) of Plymouth. He was a deacon of the Plymouth church. He m. Joanna Kempton and had ten children; note that no sons were named Richard and William as previously claimed here. See specifically pages 13 and 14 of Allen George Morton as referenced below.)

== Notable descendants ==
George Morton's descendants found prosperity in the New World and became leaders in business and government. Among the most notable are:

- Nathaniel Morton, Clerk/Secretary of Plymouth Colony from 1645 until his death in 1685 and publisher of the first history of New England, New England's Memorial, Cambridge, 1669.
- Elder Thomas Faunce, the originator of the story of Plymouth Rock.
- Perez Morton, seventh Massachusetts Attorney General and husband of American poet Sarah Wentworth Apthorp Morton.
- Marcus Morton, fourth acting, 16th and 18th Governor of Massachusetts.
- Levi Parsons Morton, 22nd Vice President of the United States and 31st Governor of New York.
- Henry Martyn Dexter and son Henry Morton Dexter, prominent American clergymen, historians, and authors.
- Julius Sterling Morton, Third United States Secretary of Agriculture and founder of Arbor Day.
- Joy Morton, son of J. Sterling Morton and founder of The Morton Salt Company.
- Paul Morton, son of J. Sterling Morton and 36th United States Secretary of the Navy.
- Lydia Jackson, second wife of philosopher, poet and Transcendentalist Ralph Waldo Emerson
- Henry Cotton Morton, son of Eleazor Morton and founder of Benton Harbor, Michigan, builder of the Morton House Museum in Benton Harbor, Michigan.

== See also ==
- Nathaniel Morton
