= Passengers of the ships Anne and Little James 1623 =

In the spring of 1623 about 90 passengers embarked on the ships Anne and Little James, two small ships sailing from London to Plymouth Colony for the purpose of providing settlers and other colony support. The 140-ton supply ship Anne and the smaller, new 44-ton pinnace Little James had been outfitted for military service. They were financed by Thomas Weston's investment group, the Merchant Adventurers, the same group that financed Mayflower in 1620 and Fortune in 1621. After a three-month voyage, Anne arrived in Plymouth, per Bradford, on July 10, 1623 and Little James a week or ten days later. After this voyage Anne was to return to her regular cargo shipping work and Little James was to remain in the colony for fishing, cargo and military service. Anne's master was William Peirce and Little James had two young men in charge – Master John Bridges, master mariner, and a novice captain, Emmanuel Altham, a Merchant Adventurer.

== Passenger composition ==
Of the 90-odd passengers, there were about 60 men, women and children total in both ships, many being former English Separatist residents of Leiden, Holland, and with about 30 others being part of an independent emigrant group led by John Oldham. This later group had been promised a separate living situation in Plymouth apart from the main settlement.

There are no separate passenger lists for each ship, as those that sailed in these ships were grouped together in records under Anne when the official land division was made in 1623 with assignment of acreage lots by name. But author Charles Banks did identify at least four men, three with families, who were passengers on Little James. These totaled about 14 persons. Banks also states that it is possible Little James had more passengers, but due to size it could not accommodate many. Additionally, eight wives accompanied their husbands on these two ships, along with twelve children most brought over by their parents, at least two of whom were Patience and Fear Brewster, daughters of William and Mary Brewster, who had arrived on the Mayflower.

== Association with Mayflower ==
In the contingent on board Anne were about 15 persons associated in some way with Mayflower passengers who had come over in 1620. Some joined husbands or future husbands: Hester Cooke, Bridget Fuller, Alice (Carpenter) Southworth who married William Bradford, Elizabeth Warren and Barbara Standish. Another had been the spouse of a now-deceased Pilgrim – Sarah Priest Cuthbertson. There were other passengers who married Mayflower passengers after arrival: Fear Brewster/Isaac Allerton, Mary Becket/George Soule, Christian Penn/Francis Eaton & Francis Billington, Experience Mitchell/Jane Cooke, Nicholas Snow/Constance Hopkins, Sarah Warren/John Cooke, Robert Bartlett/Mary Warren. And there were Mary and Sarah Priest, the daughters of the deceased Pilgrim Degory Priest, who had arrived from Leiden and later married Phineas Pratt and John Coombs respectively.

== Emigrant condition ==
Bradford states that some of the new settlers were useful persons and became “good members to the body”, some being the wives and children of men there already, some since the Fortune came over in 1621. But Bradford also related about those unfit for such a hardship settlement: “And some were so bad, as they were faine to be at charge to send them home again next year.” And the state of the passengers is relayed in an apologetic letter sent by Robert Cushman, former Leiden agent in London, to Bradford: “… It greeveth me to see so weake a company sent you, and yet had I not been here they had been weaker…Shuch and shuch came without my constente: but the importunitie of their freinds got promise of our Treasurer in my absence.”

From these statements it can be learned the reason that so many of the first arrivals disappeared from Plymouth after a few years of experiencing that hardship existence. Many of the emigrants on the Anne and Little James would eventually be sent back to England as unfit for the task of living and working in a harsh colonial environment.

== Anne passengers ==
1. Anthony Annable – Married Jane Momford in Cambridge 1619. Had four acres in 1623 land division (as Anthony Anable). In the 1627 'Division of Cattle' the four Annables shared "one red heyfer" and "two shee goats" which they shared with the other eight people in their lot #8 including the three Brownes, the three Fullers, two Fords, and Damaris Hopkins. This group received "halfe" of another animal in "consideration" for sharing with the "poore". Annable was also a Member of the 1626 Purchaser investment group. Died 1674.
2. Jane Annable (wife) d. 1643
3. Hannah Annable (daughter)
4. Sarah Annable (daughter)
5. Edward Bangs – Born c.1591 - 86 in 1677. Per Banks he was of Panfield, Essex, son of John and Jane (Chavis) Bangs. Shipwright by occupation. The 1623 land division lists four shares for him under "Bangs." From that it is thought that he may have had a family of wife and two children with him on Anne that are mysteriously missing in the 1627 'Division of Cattle'. In lot #12, he appears as single along with six members of the Hickes family, five members of the Jenes family, and with another single man, Stephen Deane. This lot shared "the great whyte backt cow which came over on the "Anne", to which cow, the keeping of the bull was joyned, and two shee goats". It can only be surmised that something happened to them between 1623 and 1627 as he (re)married after 1627. Member of the 1626 Purchaser investment group as "Edward Banges." He was with those chosen to lay out twenty-acre lots in the 1627 division. After 1627 married Lydia Hicks, daughter of Robert and Margaret Hicks, having been fellow passengers with him on Anne in 1623. Died 1677. Three members of his family that may have been with him as counted in the 1623 land division:
6. (Mrs) ___ Bangs – possibly died before 1627.
7. (child) Bangs
8. (child) Bangs
9. Robert Bartlett – Cooper (barrel maker) by occupation. Believed to be from Devon, born c. 1603. May have arrived as a servant. One share in the 1623 land division as "Robt Bartlet." Married c. 1629 Mary, daughter of Mayflower passenger Richard Warren. She was also passenger on Anne. Died 1676.
10. Mary Buckett – until recently nothing has been known of her ancestry. But in the December 2013 Mayflower Quarterly, author Caleb Johnson reports new findings based on his research in England. He believes that she may be Mary Beckett, baptized February 24, 1605 at St. Mary, Watford, Hertfordshire, the daughter of John Beckett and Ann Alden. In Plymouth she was a single woman in the 1623 land division as "Marie Buckett." Married prior to 1627 Mayflower passenger George Soule. In the 1627 'Division of Cattle' she is listed as "Mary Sowle" with husband George and son Zachariah.
11. Fear Brewster – Daughter of Elder William Brewster coming from Leiden. In the 1623 land division a portion was given to Fear Brewster along with her sister "Pacience Brewster" and Robert Long. Married Mayflower passenger Isaac Allerton in 1625 as his 2nd wife. She died in 1634.
12. Patience Brewster – Daughter of Elder William Brewster coming from Leiden. Allotted a portion in the 1623 land division, with her sister Fear and Robert Long. Married Thomas Prence, passenger on Fortune in 1621 and future colony governor.
13. Thomas Clark - Son of John and Mary (Morton) Clarke, baptized Stepney (London) c. 1599-1600. Came over as a young, unmarried man and was allotted one share in the 1623 (as Tho. Clarke) and 1627 divisions. Member of the 1626 Purchaser investment group. Married (1) Susanna Ring, daughter of Mary Ring who was the mother of all his children – William, Andrew, John, James, Susanna, and Nathaniel. Died in Plymouth 1697/8.
14. Christopher Conant – Baptized in East Budleigh, Devon in 1588, son of Richard and Agnes (Charles) Conant. Went to London in 1609 and became freeman in 1616. Lived in the London parish of St. Lawrence Jewry where his brother Roger Conant, the founder of Salem, Massachusetts, married. He had one share in the 1623 land division as "Christopher Connant". Not in the 1627 'Division of Cattle' and may have left with his brother. Living in Massachusetts Bay Colony in 1630. Probably returned to England.
15. (Mrs) Hester (Mayhieu) Cooke – A Huguenot who lived in Canterbury, England and Leiden. Wife of Mayflower passenger Francis Cooke married 1603 in Leiden. With family in 1623 land division, 6 shares, "two on the south side of the highway" and "four eastward to the sea beyond the brooke to Strawberie-hill". In the 1627 'Division of Cattle' – "ffrancis and Hester Cooke" were in "Lot #1 consisting of thirteen people. Each of the twelve lots (of 13 people each) shared 39 animals which amounted to about one cow or calf, and two goats" each. Additionally there were "3 bulls in the mix as well".
16. Jacob Cooke (son)
17. Jane Cooke (daughter)
18. Anthony Dix (Dixe) – Mariner by occupation. Received land in 1623 division as "Anthony Dixe" but number of shares received is illegible. Did not share in the 1627 'Division of Cattle' and may have moved to Salem. Name of his wife was Tabitha, who later married later married Nathaniel Pickman (Pitman). Living in Salem in 1636. Lost at sea in 1639.
19. John Faunce – His ancestry is uncertain. Received one share in both the 1623 division as "John Fance" and 1627 divisions as "John ffance." Member of the 1626 Purchaser investment group. His wife was Patience Morton, daughter of George and Juliana (Carpenter) Morton, passengers on the Little James. Died in Plymouth 1654. Father of Thomas Faunce.
20. (Mrs) Elizabeth Flavell – Wife of Thomas Flavell, who had come over with an unnamed son in Fortune in 1621. Received one share in the 1623 land division as "goodwife Flauell," but the family was not in the 1627 division.
21. Edmund Flood – Received one share in the 1623 land division, but was not listed in the 1627 'Division of Cattle' per Stratton. May have died or left the colony.
22. (Mrs) Bridget (Lee) Fuller – Third wife of Samuel Fuller, an English Separatist from Leiden who was a Mayflower passenger in 1620. She had one share in the 1623 land division as "Brigett Fuller." Samuel Fuller was the colony's physician and surgeon.
23. Godbert Godbertson (also known as Cuthbert Cuthbertson) – Hat maker from Leiden, Holland. His second wife Sarah, sister of Pilgrim Isaac Allerton, was twice widowed, the last from Mayflower passenger Degory Priest. Priest died in the winter of 1620/21 and Sarah returned to Leiden where she remarried sometime after Oct. 25 1621. Her two daughters from her Priest marriage, Mary and Sarah, accompanied them on Anne. In 1623 land division as "Cudbart Cudbartsone" with six shares. Member of the 1626 Purchaser investment group as "Cutbert Cutbertson." In the 1627 'Division of Cattle' he is listed as "Godber Godberson" and along with his wife and son are in Isaac Allerton's group #2 along with the six Allertons, two Priests, Edward Bumpasse & John Crackstone. They shared "the Great black cow, came on the Anne, the lesser one of the two steers which they must provide for and two shee goats." Both he and his wife died in a 1633 epidemic.
24. Sarah Godbertson (wife) - She died in a 1633 epidemic.
25. Samuel Godbertson (son) – Also known as Samuel Cuthbertson or shortened to Cuthbert.
26. Timothy Hatherley – A London Merchant Adventurer and felt-maker of St. Olaves, Southwark, London. Married Alice Collard in Southwark in 1614. He visited Plymouth in 1623 and returned to England. Member of the 1626 Purchaser investment group (Plymouth and London) as "Mr Hatherley." Taxed in Southwark in 1628. He came again as a settler in 1632 on William and Mary. Died 1666.
27. William Heard – He received on share in the 1623 land division but did not appear in the 1627 'Division of Cattle'.
28. Lydia Hicks – Daughter of Robert and Margaret Hicks – she arrived with her mother Margaret on Anne. After 1627 she married Edward Bangs, a fellow Anne passenger.
29. Margaret Hicks (Hix) – (wife of Robert Hicks) – arrived on Anne with her children Samuel and Lydia to join her husband Robert. In 1623 land division had 4 shares as "Robart Hickes his wife & children." He was a member of the 1626 Purchaser investment group as "Robte Hicks." In 1627 division family had 6 shares. (wife of Robert Hicks)
30. Samuel Hicks – (son of Robert and Margaret)
31. (Mrs) ____ Hilton (wife of William Hilton) – Hilton arrived on Fortune in 1621, and his family followed on Anne in 1623. She and her children received 3 acres in the 1623 land division as "William Hiltons wife & .2. children" but did not appear in the 1627 'Division of Cattle' as they had left Plymouth by then.
32. Mary Hilton (daughter of William Hilton)
33. William Hilton (jr) (son of William Hilton)
34. Edward Holman – Banks believed he was from Clapham, Surrey per Stratton. As a single man he received one share in both the 1623 division as "Edw. Holman" and 1627 division as "Edward Holdman." Member of the 1626 Purchaser investment group. His wife Amy was mentioned in a 1644 deed.
35. Manassah (Manasseh) Kempton – From Berwick-upon-Tweed on the Scottish border. Later resided in Colchester, Essex. He appears in the 1623 land division under an erroneous name of “Manasseh” (with John Faunce as “Fance”). Member of the 1626 Purchaser investment group as "Manaseth Kempton." By the 1627 'Division of Cattle' he had married Juliana (Carpenter), widow of George Morton, they all being Little James passengers. She was eldest and one of five daughters of Alexander Carpenter of Somerset in England and Leiden in Holland. In the 1627 division they appear as "Manases and Julian Kempton" with her five Morton children. They had no children together. He died 1664/1665.
36. Robert Long – He was in the 1623 land division sharing three acres with the sisters Fear and Patience Brewster. No shares in 1627 'Division of Cattle'. No further record and may have died or left the colony.
37. Experience Mitchell – Banks states he was from Duke’s Place, a parish in Aldgate, London, son of Thomas Mitchell of Cambridge, who was also of Amsterdam and Leiden. He was living in London in the summer of 1620. In the 1623 land division he is listed with the eight shares of the George Morton family. Member of the 1626 Purchaser investment group as "Experience Michell." Married (1) c. 1627 Jane Cooke, daughter of Mayflower passenger Francis Cooke. In the 1627 'Division of Cattle' he is listed with the seven members of the Francis Cooke family in Lot #1, as "Experience Michaell" including his (future) wife Jane and the other Cooke family members, the two Pratts, and three other single men. They shared a "black heyfer and two shee goates" in their group. He died before 14 May 1689, date of inventory.
38. Thomas Morton Junior – Son of Thomas Morton who came on Fortune in 1621 and nephew of George Morton, passenger on Little James. In 1623 received one share and in the 1627 division is listed with the John Howland family as "Thomas Morton Junor". Probably remained in the colony as received share in 1652 Dartmouth purchase.
39. (Mrs) Ellen (Elinor) Newton – She was a young widow of age 25 when she emigrated, dying in 1681 at aged 83. Her ancestry and name of her husband are unknown. It was believed she may have been related to one or more of the Anne passengers as young women did not travel alone in those times. In 1623 land division as "Ellen Newton." By the 1627 'Division of Cattle' she had married Fortune passenger John Adams and after his death married Kenelm Winslow, brother of Mayflower passenger Edward Winslow.
40. John Oldham – Per Banks he was originally from the town of Derby in Derbyshire. Arrived with his family including his sister Lucretia. In the 1623 land division "Mr Ouldom and those joyned with him" received ten shares covering his family and others of his group, numbering about ten persons. They had arranged independent emigration privileges with the Pilgrim authorities. In 1636 he was killed in an Indian attack on Block Island.
41. (Mrs) John Oldham (wife).
42. Mary Oldham (daughter). Married Little James passenger William Bridges.
43. Lucretia Oldham (sister) – Married Jonathan Brewster, eldest son of Elder William Brewster.
44. (Mrs) Frances Palmer - Wife of William Palmer who arrived on Fortune in 1621 with his son William. She received one share in the 1623 land division as "ffrance wife to Wit Palmer." He was a member of the 1626 Purchaser investment group as "Willm Palmer." In the 1627 division the family had 3 shares as "William, ffrances and Willm Pallmer Jnor." William Palmer died in 1637.
45. Christian Penn – A female of the John Oldham group but oddly no connection to any other Anne passenger is known. She received one share in the 1623 land division and one share in the 1627 division as "Christian Eaton" which indicates she married Mayflower passenger Francis Eaton prior to 1627 as his 3rd wife. They had a daughter Rachell born 1627 so may have married about 1625/6. After Eaton’s death in 1633 she married Mayflower passenger Francis Billington in 1634.
46. Abraham Pierce (or Peirce) – He was named with two servants in the 1623 division as "Mr Perces .2. ser:" Member of the 1626 Purchaser investment group as "Abraham Pearse." In the 1627 division he had one share as "Abraham Peirce." Died c. 1633.
47. (name unknown) - servant of A. Pierce (1623)
48. (name unknown) – servant of A. Pierce (1623)
49. Joshua Pratt – Per Banks he was a brother of Phineas Pratt who came on Sparrow in 1622 in the employ of Adventurer Thomas Weston with his failed settlement at Wessagusset (now Weymouth). In both the 1623 and 1627 divisions he was listed with 1 share with his brother Phineas (also 1 share) as in 1623 "Josuah and Phineas Prat" and in 1627 as "Joshua and Phinihas Pratt." Member of the 1626 Purchaser investment group as "Josuah Pratt." His brother Phineas was also a Purchaser member. Died c. 1656.
50. Mary Priest (step-daughter of Godbert Godbertson) – daughter of Mayflower passenger Degory Priest. Later married Phineas Pratt, brother of Anne passenger Joshua Pratt.
51. Sarah Priest (step-daughter of Godbert Godbertson) – daughter of Mayflower passenger Degory Priest. Later married John Coombs (Combe).
52. James Rande (Rand) – Per Banks he was possibly from St. George's parish, Southwark, London. Received one share in 1623 land division (as James Rande) but was not in 1627 'Division of Cattle'. He either died or left the colony.
53. Robert Ratcliffe (Rattlife) – He was a native of Cheshire. Received two shares in the 1623 land division as "Robart Rattlife" indicating his wife was with him. He was not in the 1627 'Division of Cattle'. No further record indicating he either died or left the colony.
54. (Mrs) ___ Ratcliffe
55. Nicolas (Nicholas) Snow – Banks believed he was of Hoxton, Middlesex, (London), son of Nicholas Snow. Baptized at St. Leonard's, Shoreditch, London, the parish adjoining St. Mary's Whitechapel where Stephen Hopkins (whose daughter Constance became his wife) was married in 1618. Banks believed the Hopkins family emigration caused Nicholas Snow to follow. But since burial records for St. Leonard's have become available we see that the child baptized 25 January 1599/1600 was buried three days later and could not be the husband of Constance Hopkins. He is listed in the 1623 land division as "Nicolas Snow." Member of the 1626 Purchaser investment group. By the 1627 'Division of Cattle' he was married to Mayflower passenger Constance Hopkins, daughter of Stephen, listed as "Nickolas" and Constance Snow with the Stephen Hopkins family.
56. (Mrs) Alice (Carpenter) Southworth – born about 1591, one of five daughters of Alexander and Priscilla Carpenter of Wrington, co. Somerset in England and later Leiden, Holland. She was the widow of Edward Southworth, who died 1621/22, and her future husband was William Bradford. She married Governor William Bradford in Plymouth on August 14, 1623, a few weeks after arriving on the ship Anne. He sister Julian was on the accompanying ship Little James with husband George Morton and her children. In the 1623 Land Division she is listed as "Allice Bradford" and in the 1627 'Division of Cattle' as "Alles Bradford" with her children William Bradford Junior and Mercy Bradford. Sometime after 1627 her sons with Edward Southworth, Constant (born c. 1614) and Thomas (born c. 1617) joined her at Plymouth.
57. Francis Sprague – Banks states his ancestry is unknown, although it was probable he was married and past middle age when he emigrated. His wife may have been deceased and both females with him may have been his daughters. He had three shares in the 1623 land division as "Francis Spragge" and was in the 1627 'Division of Cattle' (as "ffrancis, Anna and Mercye Sprage") with Anna and Mercy Sprague, Anna's status unknown whether wife or daughter, Mercy being a daughter. Banks says both were daughters. He was a member of the 1626 Purchaser Investment group. Died c. 1670.
58. Anna Sprague (wife or daughter – status unknown)
59. Mercy Sprague (daughter)
60. Thomas Tilden – Per Banks probably from Tenterden, Kent, where he was baptized in 1593, younger brother of Nathaniel Tilden who emigrated in 1635. Received three shares in the 1623 land division, indicating he was accompanied by a wife and child. His name is not in the 1627 'Division of Cattle' and he may have returned to England.
61. (Mrs) ____ Tilden
62. (child) Tilden
63. Stephen Tracey (Tracy) – He was a mariner by occupation. He was baptized in Great Yarmouth, Norfolk in 1596, son of Stephen and Agnes (Erdley) Tracy. Occupation of say(cloth)-weaver in Leiden where he married Tryphosa Lee in 1621. He came over directly from Leiden. He had three acres in the 1623 land division as "Steph: Tracy" meaning wife and daughter Sarah must have also been on Anne, although Stratton states may have arrived by 1625. Member of the 1626 Purchaser investment group as "Steeven Tracy." He had four shares in the 1627 division for himself and wife "Triphosa," and daughters Sarah and "Rebecka." He returned to England on a business trip cir. 1654 and died in Great Yarmouth in 1672. He prepared a legal document to dispose of his estate in Duxbury, Plymouth, Massachusetts to his wife and children who remained in New England.
64. Tryphosa Tracy (wife)
65. Sarah Tracy (daughter)
66. Ralph Wallen – Arrived with his wife Joyce. In 1623 land division as "Ralfe Walen" with unknown shares. Member of the 1626 Purchaser investment group as "Raph Wallen." Named in the 1627 'Division of Cattle' with wife Joyce. Died c. 1643.
67. Joyce Wallen (wife)
68. (Mrs) Elizabeth Warren – Wife of Mayflower passenger Richard Warren. Came over with five daughters. In 1623 land division he is listed as "Richard Waren" with five shares. In the 1627 'Division of Cattle' the family is listed in Richard Warren's lot #8 and their family of nine people, shares with the three Soule's and with John Billington. Their group (or lot) received "one of the 4 black Heyfers that came in the "Jacob" caled the 'smooth-horned Heyfer' and two sshee goates." Richard Warren died in 1628. After her husband's death, she became an after-the-fact member of the 1626 Purchaser investment group as "Elizabeth Warren, widow." She died in 1673, aged ninety years.
69. Abigail Warren (daughter) – later married Anthony Snow.
70. Ann (Anna) Warren (daughter) – later married Thomas Little.
71. Elizabeth Warren (jr) (daughter) – later married Richard Church.
72. Mary Warren (daughter) – later married Robert Bartlett, Anne passenger.
73. Sarah Warren (daughter) – later married Mayflower passenger John Cooke.
74. Barbara (unknown) – Future (2nd) wife of Myles Standish. Married sometime after arrival before 1627 and by whom he had all his known children. She did appear in the 1623 land division as “Mrs Standish.” The five-member family appears in the 1627 division with three sons and with the Winslow and White families. Standish was Plymouth Colony's chief military officer. Member of the 1626 Purchasers investment group as “Capt Miles Standish.” Myles Standish died in 1656. His wife died sometime after that year.

== Known passengers on board the Little James in 1623 ==
1. William Bridges – Possible brother or kinsman of John Bridges, Master of Little James. He was a son-in-law of John Oldham, married to his daughter Mary Oldham. In later years he stated in a petition he came over with his father-in-law in 1623. In the 1623 land division, his name does not appear but he may have been represented by John Oldham’s 10 shares. Per Stratton he resided in the Bay Colony.
2. Edward Burcher – Per Banks he was probably of Southwark St. Saviour parish, London. He was beyond middle life on this voyage as the Little James captain wrote about he and his wife: “Father Birrtcher and his wife wear as hartey as the youngest in the ship.” He received two shares in the 1623 land division for himself and his wife. He was not in the 1627 cattle division.
3. (Mrs) ___ Burcher
4. John Jenney – He was a cooper (barrel maker) by occupation. Leiden records call him a “brewer’s man” of Norwich, Norfolk. He was ship’s cooper on Little James. Arrived on the Little James with wife Sarah and children Samuel, Abigail, and Sarah. Son Samuel was born on the ship. Captain Altham wrote on September 7, 1623 that “Good wife Jennings was brought abed of a son aboard our ship.” And: “was delivered of a child in the Ship a month before we cam [sic] a shore and both are well yet, God be praised.” In the 1623 land division he is “John Jenings” with 5 shares. He was a member of the 1626 Purchaser investment group as “Mr John Jenney”. In the 1627 cattle division he is “John Jene” with 5 members of his family and 6 members of the Hicks (Hickes) family listed with him in the 12th lot. Died after c.1643. (Correction: Daughter Sarah was born during the voyage in 1623, not son Samuel as is cited in various reference materials. Son Samuel was born in Leiden in 1616 prior to the voyage.)
5. Sarah Jenney (wife) – She was Sarah Carey of Monk Soham, Suffolk. Married 1613 in Leiden.
6. Abigail Jenney (daughter)
7. Samuel Jenney (son)
8. Sarah Jenney (daughter - born on board Little James)
9. George Morton – historically famous to Plymouth Colony by being revealed as the author (possibly with William Bradford and Edward Winslow) of Mourt’s Relations, a manuscript of life and times from the earliest colony days, published in England in 1622. Morton was of York or Nottinghamshire in the north of England. He married Juliann Carpenter, then about twenty-five, in Leiden on July 22, 1612. She was the eldest of the five daughters of Alexander Carpenter of Wrington, co. Somerset in England and of Leiden in Holland. Juliann’s sister Alice was on the ship accompanying the Little James, the Anne. She came as a widow but soon married Governor Bradford. The Thomas Morton who came over on the Fortune in 1621 may have been his brother with the Thomas Morton Jr. who came on the Ann possibly being Thomas’s son and George’s nephew. Morton died in June 1624, about a year after arriving in Plymouth. In the 1627 Division of the Cattle, the Morton children are listed with his wife Juliann now listed under her second husband’s surname as “Julian Kempton” (Stratton).
10. Juliann * (Carpenter) Morton – Per Banks she was baptized in March 1584 at St. James church in Bath, co. Somerset. After her husband’s death in 1624 she married “Manasseh” Kempton. In the 1627 Division of the Cattle she and her second husband are listed along with the five Morton children. She died in Plymouth, February 19, 1664.

Note: other writers report her name as Juliana (author Stratton) or Julian (author Banks). Johnson reports her name in the 1627 Division of the Cattle as “Juliana Kempton.”

11. Nathaniel Morton (age 10). He later became Secretary (Clerk) of the Plymouth General Court. He married Lydia Cooper, sister of John Cooper, husband of his aunt Priscilla (Carpenter) Wright Cooper.
12. Patience Morton (age 8). In the 1630s she married John Faunce, an Anne passenger.
13 John Morton (son) aged 6.
14 Sarah Morton (age 3). She married William Dennis on December 20, 1644.
15 Ephraim Morton (infant). He married Ann Cooper, daughter of his aunt Priscilla (Carpenter) Wright Cooper.

== Further reading and additional sources ==
- The 1623 Division of Land (Anne passengers) - Eugene Aubrey Stratton, Plymouth Colony: Its History and People, 1620-1691 (Salt Lake City:Ancestry Publishing 1986) pp. 415–417
- The 1626 Purchasers - Eugene Aubrey Stratton, Plymouth Colony: Its History and People, 1620-1691 (Salt Lake City:Ancestry Publishing 1986) pp. 419, 420
- The 1623 Division of Land (Anne passengers) - Caleb H. Johnson, The Mayflower and Her Passengers (Indiana: Xlibris Corp., copyright 2006 Caleb Johnson), p. 267, 270
- The 1627 Division of Cattle - Eugene Aubrey Stratton, Plymouth Colony: Its History and People, 1620-1691 (Salt Lake City:Ancestry Publishing 1986) pp. 421–426
- The 1627 Division of Cattle - Caleb H. Johnson, The Mayflower and Her Passengers (Indiana: Xlibris Corp., copyright 2006 Caleb Johnson), p. 271-275.
- Charles Edward Banks, The English Ancestry and Homes of the Pilgrim Fathers: who came to Plymouth on the Mayflower in 1620, the Fortune in 1621, and the Anne and the Little James in 1623 (Baltimore, MD.:Genealogical Publishing Co., 2006)p. 131-178.
- The Anne and Little James passenger list from on-line sources:
- Passengers Lists
- Great Migration Projects
- Packrat Pro.com Ships
- Alden Organization
- Immigration Ships
- Pilgrim Hall Museum
- Charles Edward Banks Collection. From the Rare Book and Special Collections Division at the Library of Congress
