= Henry Dexter =

Henry Dexter may refer to:

- Henry Morton Dexter (1846–1910), American clergyman, historian, and editor
- Henry Dexter (sculptor) (1806–1876), American sculptor
- Henry Martyn Dexter (1821–1890), American Congregational clergyman and author
- Harry Dexter, founder of the American News Company
