= Plymouth Rock =

- U.S. National Register of Historic Places
- U.S. National Historic Landmark
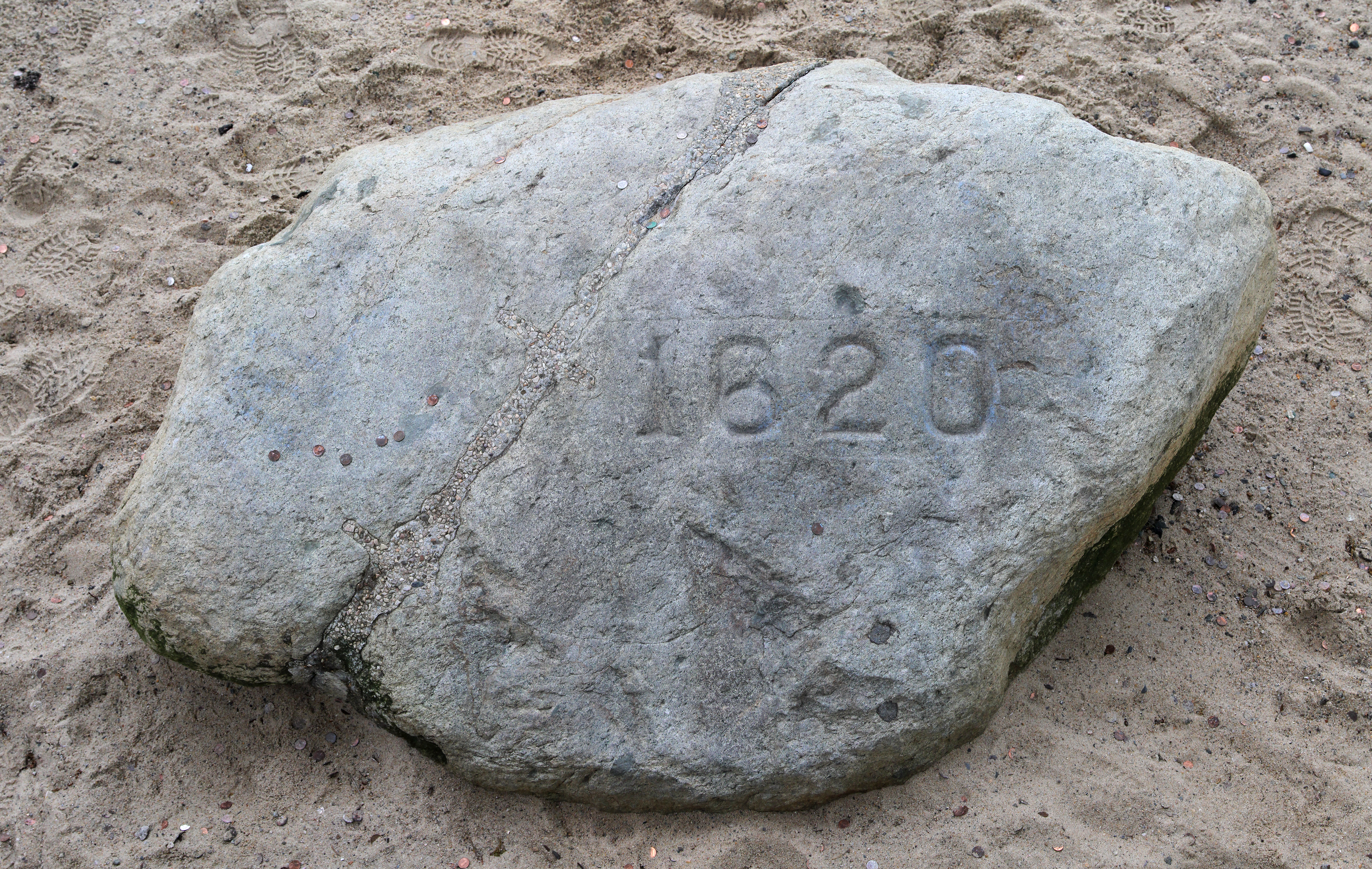
- Plymouth Rock, inscribed with 1620, the year of the Pilgrims' landing in the Mayflower

- Location within Massachusetts Location within the United States
- Location: Plymouth, Massachusetts
- Coordinates: 41°57′29.1″N 70°39′43.7″W
- NRHP reference No.: 70000680
- Added to NRHP: 1970

Plymouth Rock is a boulder in Plymouth, Massachusetts, United States, which was claimed to have been at the site where the Mayflower Pilgrims landed to found Plymouth Colony in December 1620. The Pilgrims did not refer to Plymouth Rock in any of their writings; the first known written reference to the rock dates from 1715 when it was described in the town boundary records as "a great rock". The first documented claim of Plymouth Rock as the landing place of the Pilgrims was made by 94-year-old Thomas Faunce in 1741, 121 years after the Pilgrims arrived in Plymouth.

Plymouth Rock has been moved multiple times since 1620. In 1774, the rock broke in half during an attempt to haul it to Town Square in Plymouth. One portion remained in Town Square and was moved to Pilgrim Hall Museum in 1834. Over the years, people chipped away at the portion of the Rock that remained on the shoreline, removing hundreds of pounds of stone as souvenirs. The top portion of the rock was returned to the shoreline of Plymouth Harbor in 1880. The date 1620 was inscribed at that time. In 1920 the rock was completely excavated and relocated to a new location on the shoreline and a granite portico was erected over it.

== History ==
=== Early identification ===
The two most significant primary sources on the founding of Plymouth Colony are Edward Winslow's 1622 Mourt's Relation and William Bradford's 1630–1651 history Of Plymouth Plantation, and neither refers to Plymouth Rock. The rock first attracted public attention in 1741 when the residents of Plymouth began plans to build a wharf that would bury it. Before construction began, a 94-year-old church elder named Thomas Faunce declared that the boulder was the landing place of the Mayflower Pilgrims.

Faunce eventually asked to be brought to the rock to say a farewell. According to Plymouth historian James Thacher:

A chair was procured, and the venerable [Faunce] conveyed to the shore, where a number of the inhabitants were assembled to witness the patriarch's benediction. Having pointed out the rock directly under the bank of Cole's Hill, which his father had assured him was that which had received the footsteps of our fathers on their first arrival, and which should be perpetuated to posterity, he bedewed it with his tears and bid to it an everlasting adieu.

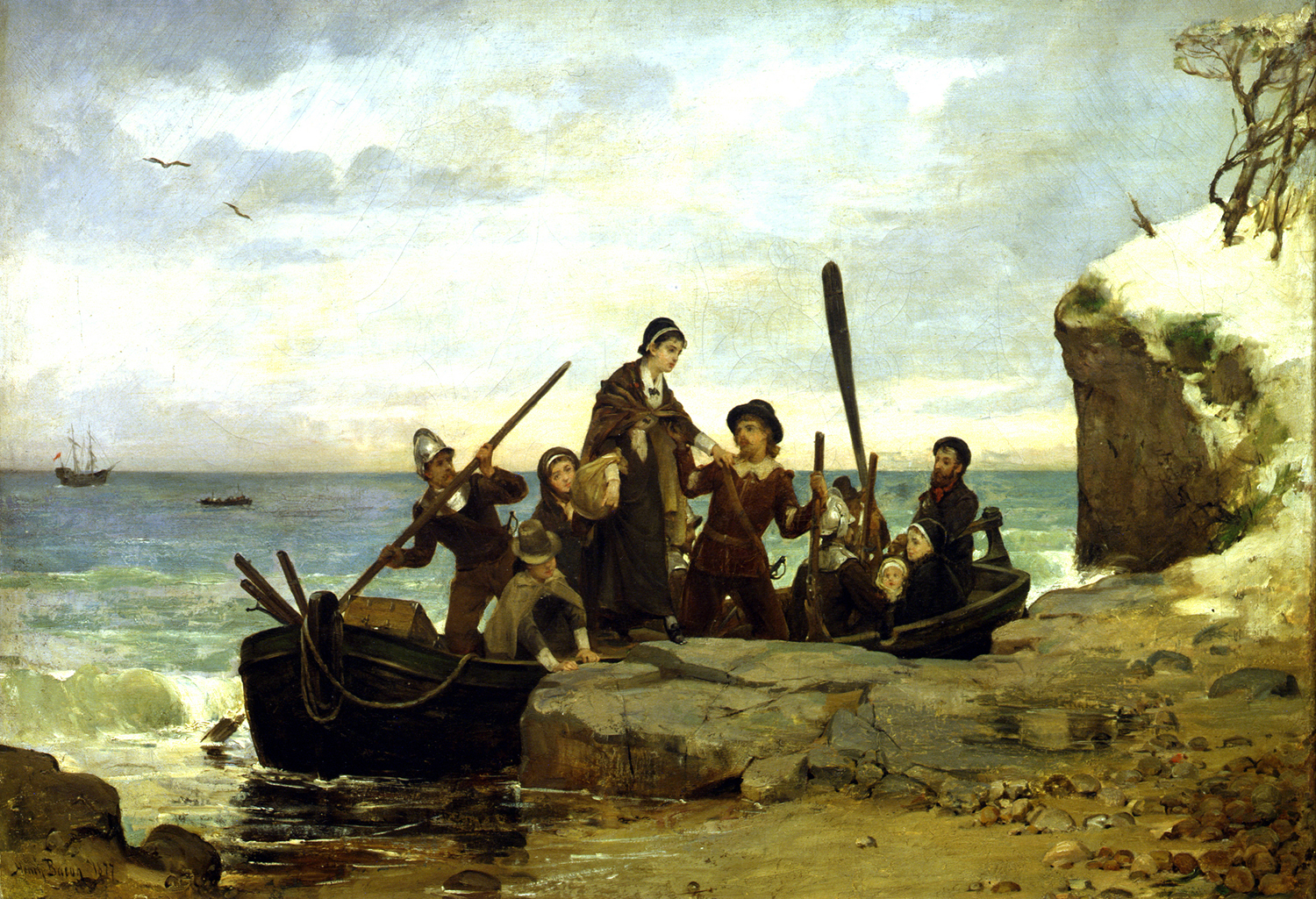
The Landing of the Pilgrims by Henry A. Bacon (1877)

Faunce's father had arrived in the colony aboard the ship Anne in 1623, three years after the Mayflower landing, and Faunce was born in 1647, when many of the Mayflower Pilgrims were still living, so his assertion made a strong impression on the people of Plymouth. The wharf was built, but the rock was left intact, the top portion protruding from the earth so as to be visible to curious visitors.

Later generations questioned Faunce's assertion, alleging that he invented the story or did not have the correct facts, given that he was not an eyewitness to the event. Donna D. Curtin, Executive Director of the Pilgrim Hall Museum, stated that the rock has "unquestionably" been moved multiple times. This includes being raised from its original location due to the construction of a wharf, and its later excavation and relocation onto the shoreline in 1920, indicating that the rock's location has changed significantly over time. Journalist Bill Bryson, for example, wrote, "The one thing the Pilgrims certainly did not do was step ashore on Plymouth Rock", arguing that the boulder would have made an impractical landing spot. Others have pointed out that the Pilgrims landed at Provincetown to explore Cape Cod more than a month before they arrived in Plymouth harbor, which lessens the significance of where they set foot in Plymouth. In 1851, a group of Cape Cod residents formed the Cape Cod Association for the purpose of promoting Provincetown as the site of the original Pilgrim landing. Such efforts eventually led to the construction of the Pilgrim Monument in Provincetown, which was completed in 1910.

=== Movements ===
Col. Theophilus Cotton (son of Plymouth magistrate Josiah Cotton) and the townspeople of Plymouth decided to move the rock in 1774. It split in two, however, so the bottom portion was left behind at the wharf and the top portion was relocated to the town's meeting house.

Captain William Coit wrote in The Pennsylvania Journal of November 29, 1775 that he brought captive British sailors ashore "upon the same rock our ancestors first trod".

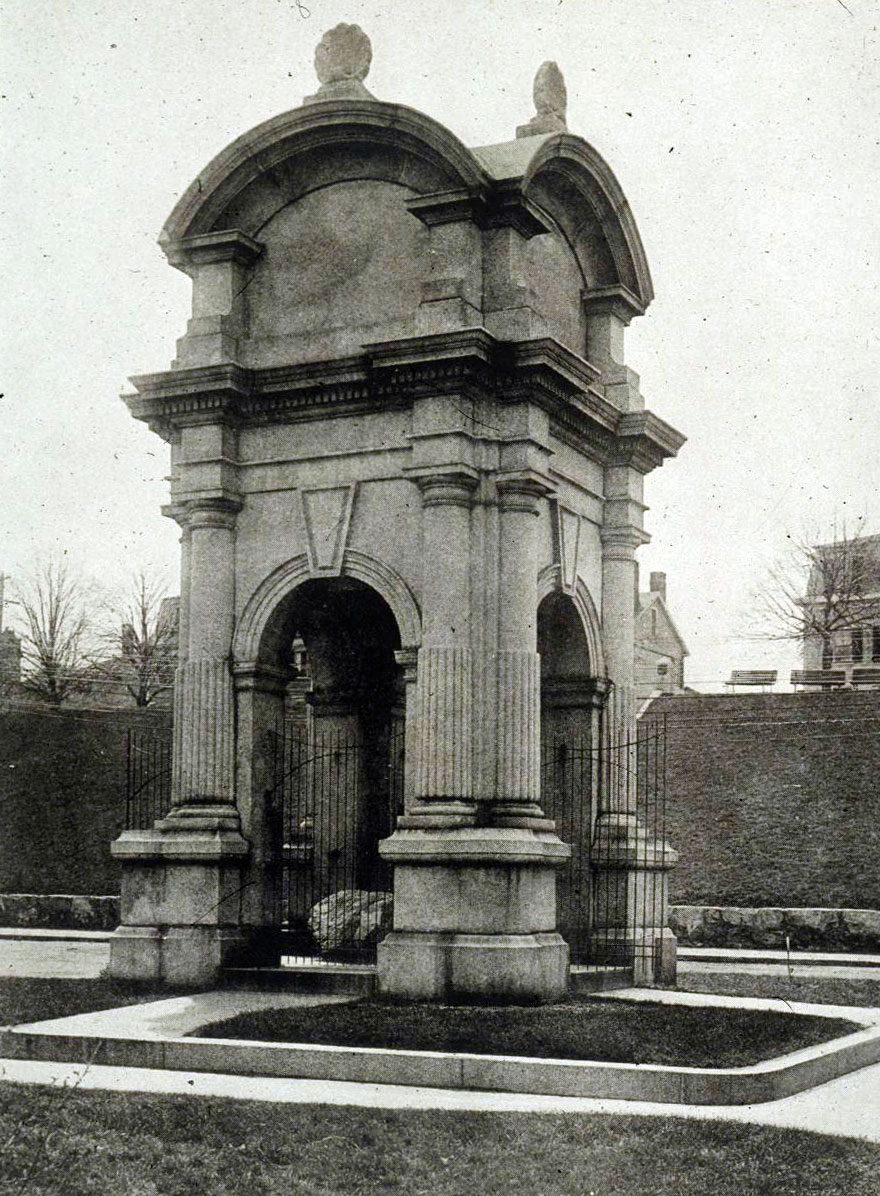
The 1867 monumental canopy that housed Plymouth Rock until 1920

A large portion of the rock was relocated from Plymouth's meetinghouse to Pilgrim Hall in 1834. In 1859, the Pilgrim Society began building a Victorian canopy designed by Hammatt Billings at the wharf over the portion of the rock left there, which was completed in 1867. The Pilgrim Hall section of the rock was moved back to its original wharf location in 1880, rejoined to the remaining portion, and the date "1620" was carved into it.

In 1920, the rock was temporarily relocated so that the old wharves could be removed and the waterfront landscaped to a design by architect Arthur Asahel Shurcliff, with a waterfront promenade behind a low seawall in such a way that, when the rock was returned to its original site, it would be at water level. The care of the rock was turned over to the Commonwealth of Massachusetts, and a new Roman Doric portico was constructed, designed by McKim, Mead & White for viewing the tide-washed rock protected by gratings.

During the rock's many journeys throughout the town of Plymouth, numerous pieces were taken and sold. Today approximately a third remains. It is estimated that the original Rock weighed 20,000 lb (9,100 kg). Some documents indicate that tourists or souvenir hunters chipped it down, although no pieces have been noticeably removed since 1880. Today there are pieces in Pilgrim Hall Museum and in the Smithsonian's National Museum of American History.

A 40-pound (18 kg) piece of the Rock is set on a pedestal in the cloister of historic Plymouth Church of the Pilgrims in Brooklyn Heights, New York. The church was formed by a merger of Plymouth Church and Church of the Pilgrims and was originally pastored by Henry Ward Beecher, brother of author Harriet Beecher Stowe.

In 1835, French author Alexis de Tocqueville wrote:

This Rock is become an object of veneration in the United States. I have seen bits of it carefully preserved in several towns of the Union. Does not this sufficiently show that all human power and greatness is in the soul of man? Here is a stone which the feet of a few outcasts pressed for an instant, and this stone becomes famous; it is treasured by a great nation, its very dust is shared as a relic.

=== State park attraction ===
Plymouth Rock is managed by the Department of Conservation and Recreation for the Commonwealth of Massachusetts as part of Pilgrim Memorial State Park. From April through November, Pilgrim Memorial is staffed by guides who inform visitors of the story of Plymouth Rock.

While the rock is currently situated beneath a granite canopy at Pilgrim Memorial State Park, it has been moved several times since the 18th century. Experts such as Donna D. Curtin of the Pilgrim Hall Museum and Dr. Simon Engelhart of Durham University's Department of Geography confirm that Plymouth Rock has been relocated multiple times, with its current location differing from its original position in 1620.

== Panorama ==
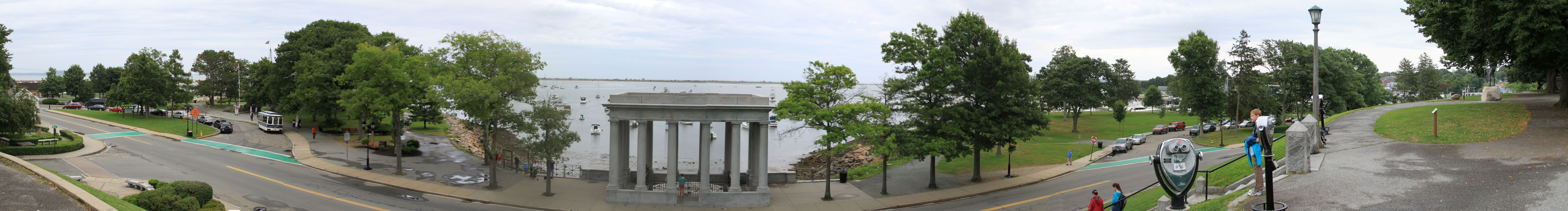
The present (1920) superstructure designed by McKim, Mead & White for the Tercentenary of Plymouth Rock with the replica Mayflower II (left, behind trees) and Cole's Hill (right) with the Statue of Massasoit

== See also ==
- List of individual rocks
- National Register of Historic Places listings in Plymouth County, Massachusetts

== General and cited references ==
- Arner, Robert, "Plymouth Rock Revisited: The Landing of the Pilgrim Fathers", Journal of American Culture 6, no. 4, Winter 1983, pp. 25–35.
- Bill Bryson (1998). Made In America. Black Swan. ISBN 9780552998055.
- Davis, Samuel, "Notes on Plymouth", Massachusetts Historical Society Collections, vol. 3, 2nd ser., 1815.
- McPhee, John, "Travels of the Rock", The New Yorker, February 26, 1990, pp. 108–117.
- Northrup, Dale (1996). Frommer's New England 1996. Macmillan USA. OCLC 34328103.
- Francis Russell (October 1962). "The Pilgrims and The Rock". American Heritage. 13 (6).
- Seelye, John (1998). Memory's Nation: The Place of Plymouth Rock. Chapel Hill, NC: University of North Carolina Press. ISBN 9780807865934.
- Thacher, James (1832). History of the town of Plymouth: from its first settlement in 1620 to the year 1832. Boston: Marsh, Capen & Lyon. OCLC 317695485.
- U.S. Geological Survey Geographic Names Information System: Plymouth Rock
- "Plymouth Rock". Pilgrim Hall Museum. 2005-05-18. Archived from the original on 2015-12-18.
