= Uncle George =

Uncle George may refer to:

- The American theologian Increase N. Tarbox
- The fictional uncle of Bertie Wooster George Wooster
- "Uncle George", a song by Steel Pulse from the album Tribute to the Martyrs

== See also ==
- George (disambiguation)
