= Thomas Clark (pilgrim) =

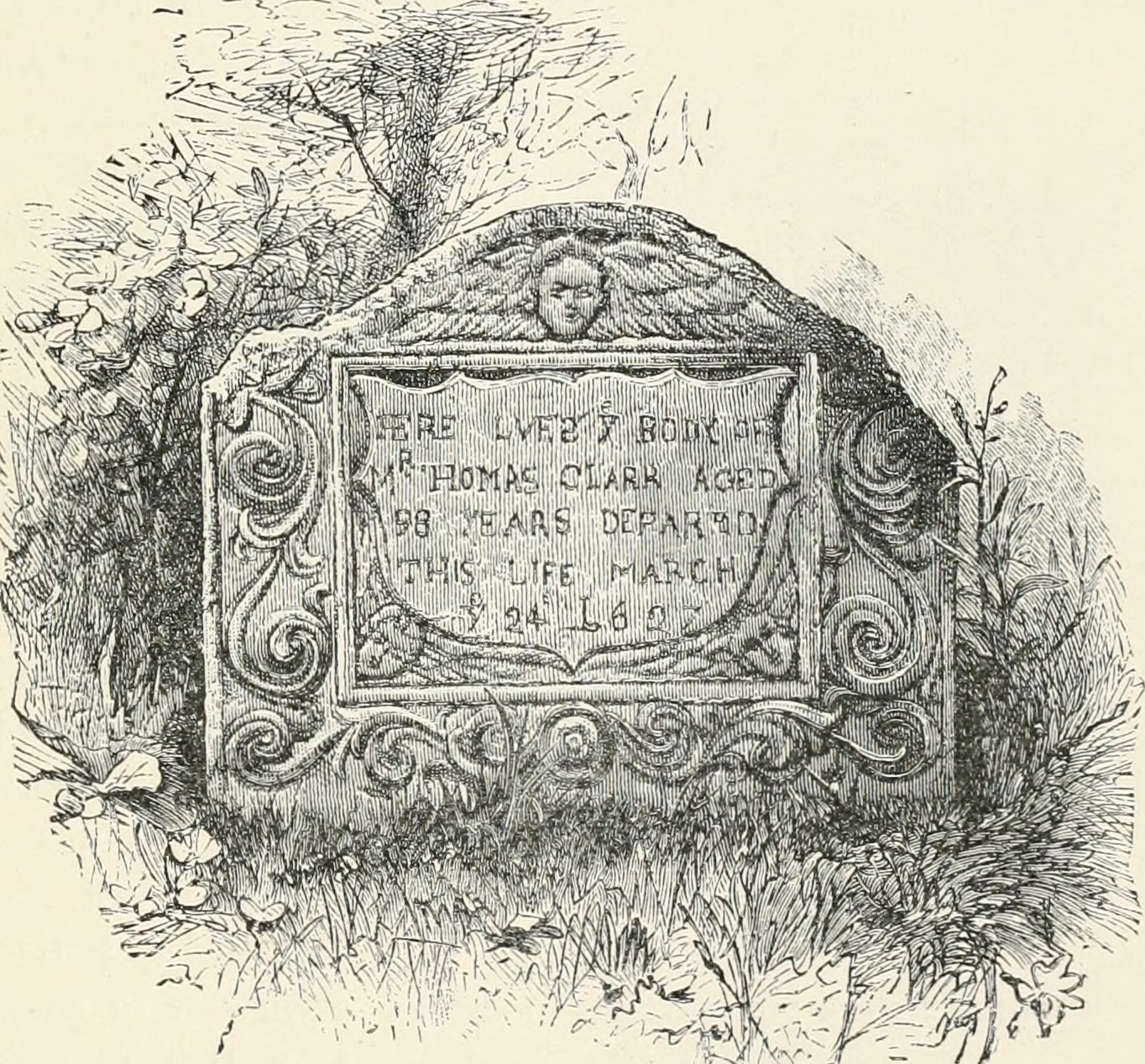
- Gravestone in Burial Hill
- Born: c. 1599 (O.S.); London, England
- Died: 1697 (aged 97–98); Plymouth Colony
- Burial place: Burial Hill, Plymouth, Massachusetts
- Other names: Thomas Clarke, John Clarke [sic], William Clarke [sic]
- Occupation: Lawyer
- Spouse(s): Susanna Ring (m. 1631; died 1646) Alice Hallett Nichols (m. 1664; died 1671)

Thomas Clark (or Clarke, b. c. 1599 -- d. 1697) was an immigrant from England to Plymouth Colony, arriving to the New World likely on the ship Anne in 1623. He lived on land near present-day Chiltonville on the Eel River. Clark married Susanna (or Susan) Ring and had several children, whose lineage is recorded today. By 1660, the Clarks lived in Boston, but returned to Plymouth area by 1673. Thomas Clark is confused in records with a Mayflower ship's mate, John Clarke, which may have been Thomas's father but is unproven. A carpenter named William Shurtleff apprenticed under a Thomas Clark in 1634.

Records indicate Thomas was born in or near the Stepney part of London. He was baptized either in 1599 (O.S.) or 1600 (N.S.) at either St Dunstan's, Stepney or St Mary's Church, Rotherhithe. His parents were named John Clark(e) and Mary (née Morton).

Thomas Clark's name is listed "Old Comers" to the Plymouth Colony. He was a member of the 1626 Purchaser investment group that financed the colony missions of the Mayflower, Fortune, Anne, and Little James. Thomas was allotted one share in the 1623 and 1627 divisions of property.

Clark married Susanna (or Susan) Ring, daughter of Mary Ring. Susanna's children were William, Andrew, John, James, Susanna (II), and Nathaniel. Susanna died some time after 1646. Thomas married an Alice Hallett Nichols after January 20, 1664/65 (O.S./N.S.) in Boston. Alice died before July 25, 1671.

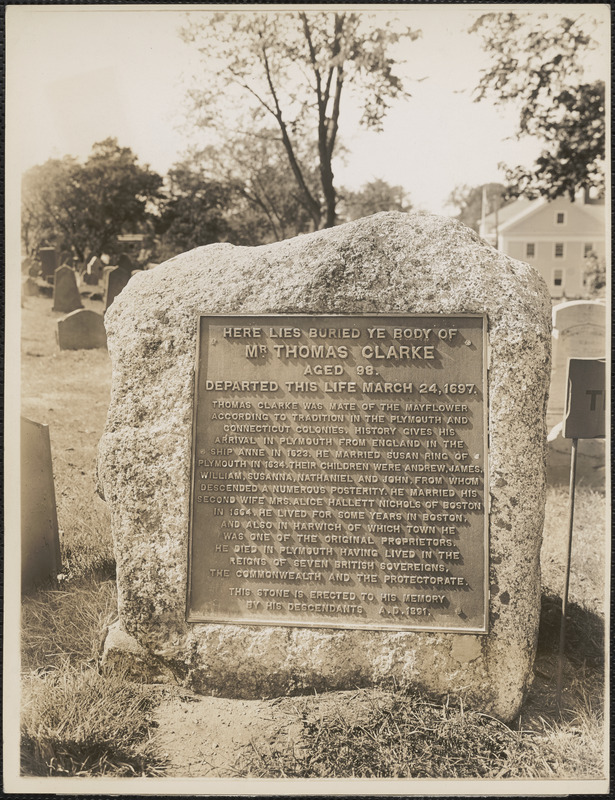
Gravestone and plaque in Burial Hill

Thomnas Clark's grave marker on Burial Hill claims that he had lived to the age of 98 years.
