= Captain Jones =

Captain Jones may refer to:

- Christopher Jones (Mayflower captain) (c. 1570–1622), captain of the 1620 voyage of the Pilgrim ship Mayflower
- Dan Jones (Mormon) (1810–1862), influential Welsh missionary
- John Paul Jones (1747–1792), the United States' first well-known naval commander
- Davy Jones (Pirates of the Caribbean), fictional captain of the Flying Dutchman
