= Christopher Jones (Mayflower captain) =

Master of the Mayflower (c. 1570–1622)

Master Christopher Jones Junior
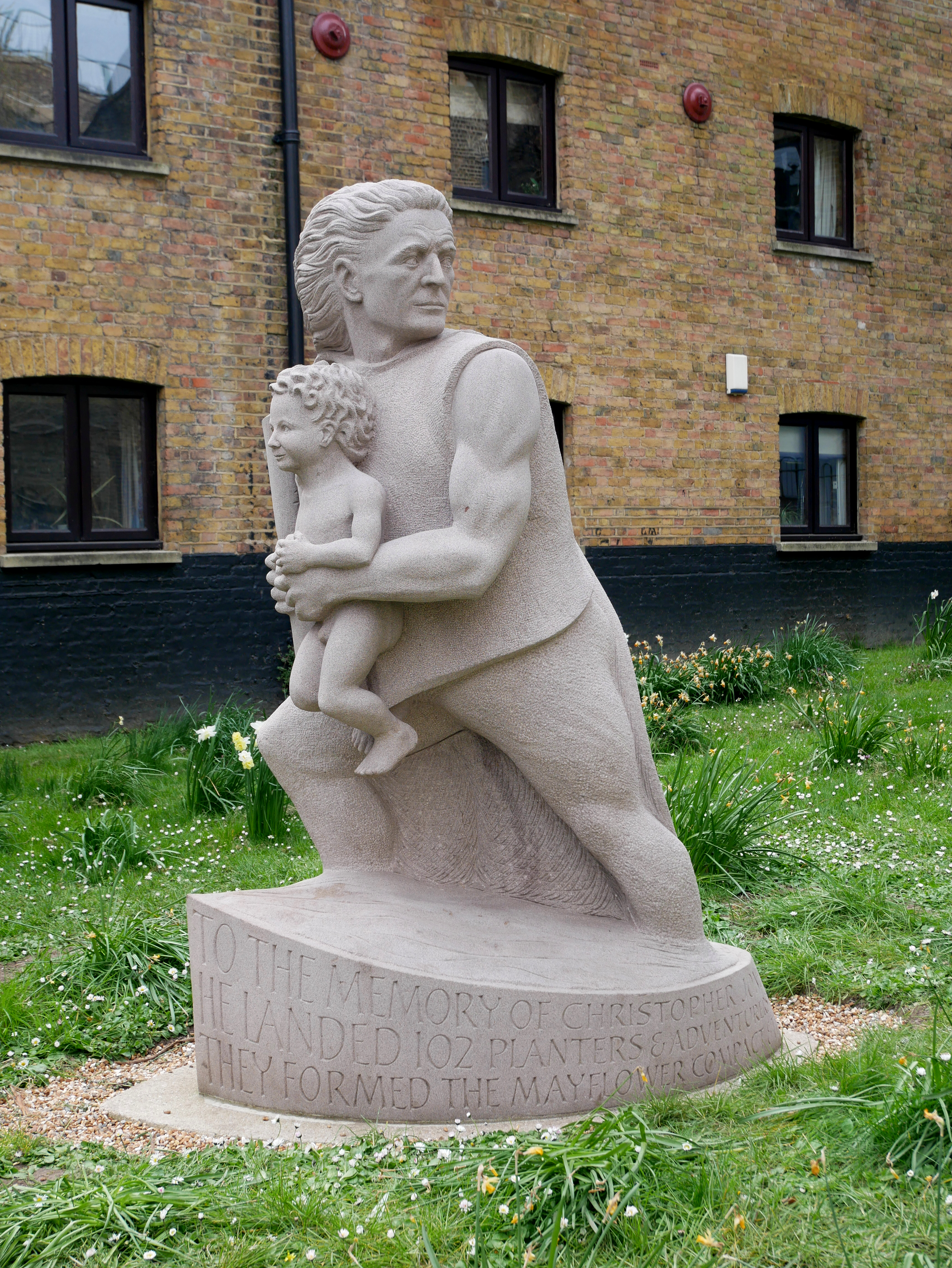
- Memorial to Christopher Jones in the St Mary's Church, Rotherhithe
- Born: c. 1570; Harwich, Essex (presumed)
- Died: March 5, 1622 (aged 51–52); Atlantic Ocean
- Parents: Christopher Jones Sr. (father); Sybil (mother)

Master Christopher Jones Jr. (c. 1570 – about 5 March 1622) was the sea captain of the 1620 voyage of the Pilgrim ship Mayflower.

== Early life ==
Christopher Jones is believed to have been born in Harwich, Essex, around 1570, although baptismal records are blank for his parish church for the period of time between April 1565 and June 1571.

He was the son of Christopher Jones (senior), of Welsh descent, and his second wife, Sybil, of English descent. His father was a mariner and ship owner who died in 1578, leaving to his young son, bearing his name, his interest in the ship Marie Fortune when he turned 18. Jones' mother Sybil married Robert Russell after his father's death and continued to reside at the Jones family home on Kings Head Street in Harwich. (The house is now a tourist attraction. The family home of Christopher Jones's first wife, Sara Twitt, is across the street and is now a small hotel, the Alma.)

== Family ==
Christopher Jones married twice:

1. Jones married Sara Twitt at St. Nicholas Church, Harwich on 27 December 1593. She was aged 17 and had been born about 1576. She was Jones' neighbour, living opposite each other on Kings Head Street, Harwich; both residences still exist as visitor attractions. Sara had a wealthy father, Thomas Twitt, who had strong shipping interests. At his death, her father provided considerable funds for her and a 1/12 share in his ship Apollo. The two families combined their shipping interests to mutual advantage.

Within a year of his marriage to Sara, they had a boy named Thomas, after Sara's father. But the church burial register records the infant's death on 17 April 1596. Sara had no more children and died at age 27. She was buried in Harwich on 18 May 1603.

2. Jones married his second wife, Josian Gray (née Thompson), widow of Richard Gray, age 19, at St. Nicholas Church in Harwich a few months after his first wife's Sara's death in 1603. Josian had seafaring relatives and her late husband was a noted mariner with friends among the captains of the 1588 Armada Fleet and which included 'treasure hunting' in the Indies; this have may included attacks on Spanish treasure ships. Josian probably brought a substantial marriage portion and had inherited her late husband's house in Church Street, Harwich together with other land and property. One of his ships was named Josian, in honour of his wife.

It is believed Josian may have remarried in 1626 as in that year a 'Joan Jones', widow, married one Thomas Bartelmore at Stepney, London, directly across the Thames from Rotherhithe.

Their marriage produced eight children, of whom the following four children were known to have been born in Harwich:

- Christopher Jones b. 1604
- Thomas Jones, b. 1607
- Josian Jones, b. 1609
- John Jones, b. 1621. He was baptised 4 March 1621 in Harwich, Essex, where Jones' wife had gone to reside while he was on his voyage to the New World and was anchored in Plymouth Harbour over the winter of 1620-21.

And the following children were born in Rotherhithe, London, to which the family moved in 1611.

- Roger Jones, b. 1611
- Christopher Jones, b. 1614
- Joane Jones, b. 1615
- Grace Jones, b. 1619

== Harwich, Essex ==
Queen Elizabeth I called Harwich "a pretty town", and it was extremely loyal to her in sending three ships to join the attack against the Spanish Armada in 1588. As with Plymouth, Harwich became wealthy by the pillaging of Spanish ships of the Armada though its primary business then was the export of English woollen cloth to Holland for finishing. Its explorers also could relate some stories of far places travelled to, with tales when Jones was a youth of their men voyaging as far as Baffin Island in the far Arctic.

The entrance to Harwich port was covered with dangerous sandbars, and sailors had to stay alert at all times. A prime example of this was on a night in 1627 when a strong North Sea storm wrecked more than thirty ships. These were the waters in which Jones served his apprenticeship at the side of his father and grandfather, who were both Harwich skippers. At age eighteen, Jones inherited his first part-share of a ship.

Harwich was a town managed by a company of mariners and shipwrights who enforced harsh discipline. In 1605 some women were hanged as witches and harlots and were dragged through the streets by a cart and with such as dice games also being banned. As with other seaports around the country, Harwich was a place where sea captains and merchants ran the local government and levied their own taxes on the citizens to take care of town business.

In his mid-thirties Jones was somewhat of a prominent Harwich citizen and was named as a burgess of Harwich in a new town charter granted by King James. Jones was coming into his own about this time, and with an assist from a bounty, he built a 240-ton, larger than average ship of his own which he named after his second wife – Josian. Jones used the ship for trading voyages as far south as to Bordeaux in France.

In 1601, he was one of 77 men who took the oath as freeman of the Borough of Harwich.

In 1604, his name is listed as one of the 24 capital burgesses on the Great Charter granted by King James I.

Civil accounts record Jones acting as an assessor for tax on land and property and also as a jury member when his father-in-law was reprimanded for failing to repair steps to the quay adjacent to his house.

In 1605, Jones was accused, with George Colman, for keeping hunting dogs, a pursuit that was only open to those classed as 'gentlemen' whose land was valued at a certain per annum value. Apparently Jones had prospered but had not reached the class of 'gentleman'.

In August 1609, records first note Christopher Jones as master and part owner of the Mayflower when his ship was chartered for a voyage from London to Trondheim in Norway, and back to London. Due to bad weather, on her return the ship lost an anchor and made short delivery of her cargo of herrings. Litigation was involved and was proceeding in 1612.

In a document of January 1611, Christopher Jones is described as being 'of Harwich', and his ship is called the Mayflower of Harwich (in Essex co.).

Then, in about 1611, Jones decided to leave Harwich and moved south to London, where he made his home in Rotherhithe parish, a mile downstream on the Thames from the Tower of London. By that time, Jones had likely traded the ship Josian for a quarter share ownership in the smaller Mayflower.

== Rotherhithe, London ==
In 1611 Christopher Jones is recorded as removing to Rotherhithe parish, then in Surrey, now in London. This was his home until his death in 1622.

Records of Jones' ship Mayflower have the ship in the Thames in London in 1613 – once in July and again in October and November.

Records of 1616 again state Jones' ship was in the Thames and the noting of wine on board suggests the ship had recently been on a voyage to France, Spain, Portugal, the Canaries, or some other wine country.

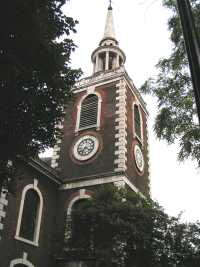
St Mary the Virgin Church Rotherhithe

By about 1600, Rotherhithe and Ratcliff parishes were country retreats of wealthy Londoners, but gradually, as London grew, they filled with buildings and population. By the late 1620s, those parishes accounted for 120 mariners. Wine was the primary trade product of commercial London and made the fortune of Rotherhithe's mariners. Jones' wealthiest associate was also a ship's master, Anthony Wood of the Rainbow, who ranked at the top of parish taxpayers, owning shares of three ships and numerous houses on both sides of the Thames. He owed his wealth to the fine vintages of the Spanish port of Alicante, which was the favorite drink of James I and was a quite lucrative trade. Jones' wealthiest client was William Speight, one of the mercantile elite, who resided in Vinery Ward, the wine merchant's district, opposite Shakespeare's Globe Theatre. As warden of the Company of Merchant Taylors, Speight owned property that ranged from country estates in Suffolk to lower-level dwellings and warehouses in London. In May 1620, on his last trip before carrying the Pilgrims, Jones carried fifty tons of wine for Speight which was extremely profitable for the merchant.

Men like Wood, Speight and Jones prospered due to the popularity of alcohol as the wealth of the landowning classes increased. At the peak of the wine trade in 1615, London imported three times the wine that had been imported typically twenty years previously. In 1615, a typical voyage by Jones in the Mayflower would see him bring back from France as much as eighty tons of wine and on the trip to New England, the Mayflower carried at least one keg each of French or Dutch wine. When Jones left London aboard the Mayflower on a voyage to France, he would normally carry as trade goods to exchange for quality French wine a hold filled with English woollens, the country's strongest export. As a family man, Jones had to keep his ship operating, and as trade was waning due to the European economic situation, the offer of Thomas Weston of the Merchant Adventurers to charter his ship for an Atlantic voyage seemed to come at a most opportune time.

In addition to wine and wool, with Jones as captain the Mayflower had transported hats, hemp, Spanish salt, hops and vinegar to Norway. Jones had travelled to Mediterranean Sea ports, being then part owner with Nichols, Robert Child, Thomas Short. In 1620 Capt. Jones and Robert Child still owned their quarter shares in the ship, and it was from them that Thomas Weston chartered her in the summer of 1620 to undertake the Pilgrim voyage.

== Officers and crew of the Mayflower ==
Most scholars agree with author Charles Banks' estimation that the Mayflower had a crew of about 50: 36 men 'before the mast' (crew) and 14 officers on the master's staff. This included the following officers: four master's mates, four quartermasters, surgeon, carpenter, cooper, cook, boatswain and gunner. The entire crew stayed with the Mayflower when it wintered over in Plymouth in 1620-1621, with about half of them dying during that time, including the gunner, boatswain, 3 of 4 quartermasters and cook. The survivors returned to London on the Mayflower, sailing from Plymouth on 5 April 1621.

The identity of several key officers under the master has been well established. Two master's mates (pilot) with previous New World sailing experience were John Clarke, age 45, and Robert Coppin. They were assisted by Master's Mate Andrew Williamson. John Alden, a born-and-raised Harwich man and possibly a distant relative of Christopher Jones, was the ship's cooper. It was he who was sent early to Southampton, to buy provisions for the journey and "cooper" them in casks. John Alden remained in Plymouth and later married Priscilla Mullins. An important person on the master's staff that Bradford oddly neglected to mention was the ship's surgeon, a young man just out of apprenticeship as a London barber-surgeon by the name of Giles Heale. His name appears as a witness to the death-bed will of William Mullins in February 1621. Another person that Bradford also did not mention who is recorded as possibly being a principal officer of the Mayflower due to his title, is a man identified only as "Master" Leaver. He is recorded in Mourt's Relation (1622) as rescuing Pilgrims lost in a forest in January 1621.

== Voyage of the Pilgrim Ship Mayflower ==
Mayflower embarked about sixty-five passengers in London about the middle of July 1620, proceeded to Southampton on the English south coast and met Speedwell bringing the Leyden contingent from Holland. The two ships planned to begin their trans-Atlantic journey on 5 August, but problems with Speedwell, which could not be corrected, caused the loss of a month of critical voyage time with the fall Atlantic gale season coming on. After two false starts and repairs to Speedwell, some of the passengers chose not to continue and returned to Holland on Speedwell. The remaining passengers boarded the Mayflower, which with 102 passengers and a crew of possibly 30-40, finally departed Plymouth, Devon on 6 September O.S. (16 September, N.S.). After 66 days of fighting gales and with the ship's timbers rupturing, and with a detriment to the health of all on board, the Mayflower finally arrived within the waters of the Cape Cod Bay on 11 November before anchoring off what is now Provincetown. Recent research has revealed that the ship docked at the tiny fishing village of Renews in Newfoundland for fresh water and food before arriving in Provincetown. The Mayflower and its passengers and crew would proceed to establish a settlement at Plymouth, on the other side of the Cape Cod Bay from Provincetown.

Over the next five months of the winter and spring of 1620–1621, Captain Jones, his crew and the Mayflower would remain in Plymouth. He had originally planned to return to England as soon as the Pilgrims found a settlement site, but members of his ship's crew were ravaged by the same illnesses that overcame the Mayflower passengers, and he had to remain in Plymouth Harbor "till he saw his men began to recover". John Alden also fell ill but was nursed back to health by his eventual wife Priscilla Mullins. Priscilla lost all of her family to the unknown illness, whom she also nursed during that fateful winter.

The Mayflower remained in Plymouth Harbor through the winter and then on 5 April, with her empty hold ballasted by stones from the Plymouth Harbor shore, Jones set sail for England. As with the Pilgrims, her sailors had been decimated by illness, with Jones having lost his boatswain, his gunner, three quartermasters, the cook, and more than a dozen sailors.

The Mayflower made excellent time on her return voyage back to England. The westerly winds that had buffeted the ship on departure pushed her along going home, and she arrived at her home port in Rotherhithe on the Thames on 5 May 1621 – less than half the time it had taken her to sail to America.

Among the 102 passengers were six Essex residents from the Great Burstead area, south-west of Harwich. These included Christopher Martin, the Mayflower's treasurer who was responsible for provisioning the ship, his wife, step-son and servant, together with two single men from Great Burstead – Peter Browne and Richard Britteridge. All died that first winter in Plymouth except Peter Browne.

After Jones' return from New England, by the summer of 1621 he had resumed his former trading voyages to continental Europe. But by this time it had become evident that the severe deprivations of the Pilgrim voyage had badly undermined his health, as it had so many other Mayflower voyagers.

== Death and memorials ==
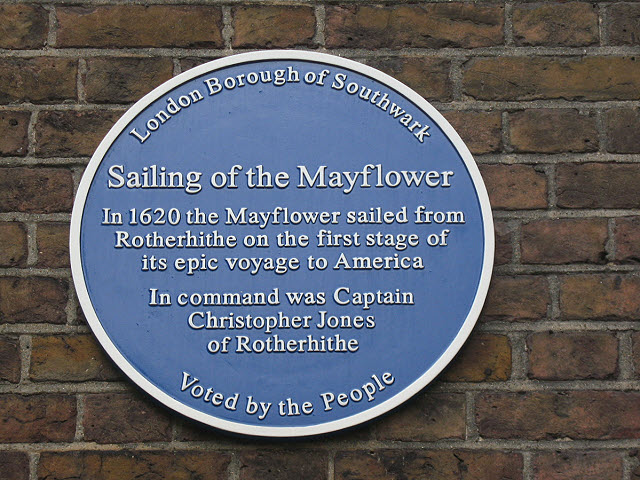
The Mayflower plaque at St Mary's Church, Rotherhithe

Jones died in early March 1622 at about age 52 after returning from a voyage to France. St Mary The Virgin in Rotherhithe records his burial as 5 March in their churchyard. Administration of his estate was granted to his widow on 26 August, but the subsequent history of her and her young children is largely unknown. However, while her husband was away and during her pregnancy, she returned to her family in Harwich, Essex, awaiting news of his return. The child was born in Harwich in 1621 and baptised there as "John Jones", perhaps after hearing from her husband that his cousin and friend, John Alden, had decided to stay in America.

The rector at St Mary's from 1611 to 1654 was Thomas Gataker, a Puritan, and Captain Jones may have learned Puritanism from him and could be the reason he accepted the risky task of transporting religious separatists to the New World. Also living in Rotherhithe after 1611 were Mayflower part-owners John Moore and First Mate John Clarke, after whom Clarke's Island in Plymouth Bay, Massachusetts is named. Clarke had been baptized in St. Mary's in 1575 and spent five years, from 1611 to 1616 as a prisoner of Spain.

Although St Mary's Church was rebuilt in 1715, it contains many memorials to sailors from the original (medieval) church, although Captain Jones' grave was lost during the rebuilding.

According to St Mary's information, Jones' body was buried in the churchyard, but the exact location almost 400 years later is unknown.

There are two memorials in St Mary's to famous Rotherhithe resident Captain Jones and the Mayflower:

In 1995, a tablet in memorial of Jones and the sailing of the Mayflower from Rotherhithe has been placed inside the St Mary's Church in the East end. The tablet reads:

THE MAYFLOWER
Christopher Jones, Master and part owner was buried in the churchyard, 5 March 1622.
This tablet was erected on the occasion of the 250th anniversary of the Consecration of this church.

In 2004, a large round 'blue plaque' indicating a place of special interest, was placed on a wall outside St Mary's church tower. It denotes the sailing of the Mayflower in 1620 and of its commander, Captain Christopher Jones, as being of Rotherhithe.

== Fate of the Mayflower ==
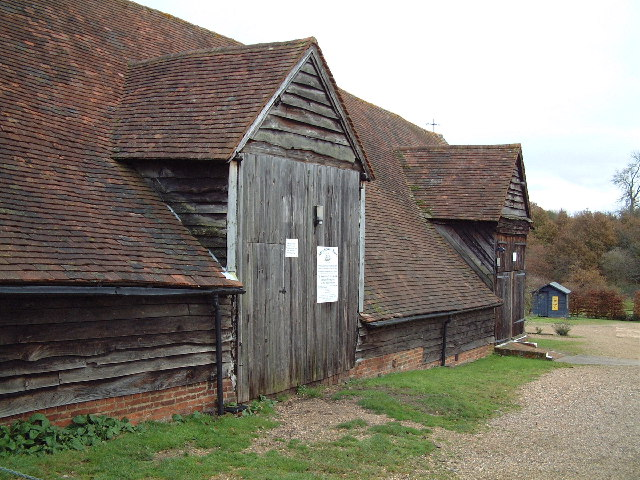
The Mayflower Barn in Jordans, Buckinghamshire

After Jones died in 1622, the Mayflower lay idle on the mud flats of the River Thames near Rotherhithe and was reported in many books to be a rotting hulk. In 1624, the remaining owners of the ship, Roberte Childe, John Moore, Josian Jones, his widow, and a fifth owner, applied for her to be appraised for worth in the High Court of the Admiralty. The sellable items, not including the timbers, were valued at £128.5 (equivalent to £26,493 in 2025). It is thought by some that the cash was shared among the three named partners and the timbers given to the fourth partner as his share.

Seemingly plausible but unconfirmed claims made by Rendel Harris of the University of Manchester in two books, The Last of the Mayflower (London, 1920) and The Finding of the Mayflower (London, 1920) that the Mayflower's timbers were reused in 1625 to build The Mayflower Barn and extend the farmhouse at Jordans Farm in Jordans, Buckinghamshire, have been found to be unreliable and have not stood up to scrutiny. The barn is built from the remains of a 17th-century ship, however it has not been proved that it is the Mayflower.

== 400th anniversary ==
The year 2020 marked the quatercentenary of the Pilgrim fathers' journey on the Mayflower. All plans to mark the occasion were unable to take place because of the COVID-19 pandemic. Christopher Jones' House at 21 King's Head Street, Harwich can still be viewed externally but will not be open to the public during 2026. There remain long term plans for the purchase of the house so that it can become a permanent museum celebrating the life of Christopher Jones of Harwich and his historic journey.

== Sources ==
- Banks, Charles Edward (2006) [Originally published 1929]. The English Ancestry and Homes of the Pilgrim Fathers: who came to Plymouth on the Mayflower in 1620, the Fortune in 1621, and the Anne and the Little James in 1623. Baltimore: Genealogical Publishing Co.
- Bunker, Nick (2010). Making Haste from Babylon: The Mayflower Pilgrims and their New World. NY: Alfred A. Knopf. ISBN 9780307266828.
- Johnson, Caleb H. (2006). The Mayflower and Her Passengers. Indiana: Xlibris Corp.
- Philbrick, Nathaniel (2006). Mayflower: A Story of Courage, Community and War. Penguin Books.
