= John Clarke (mariner) =

Master's mate, or pilot of the Mayflower

Captain John Clarke
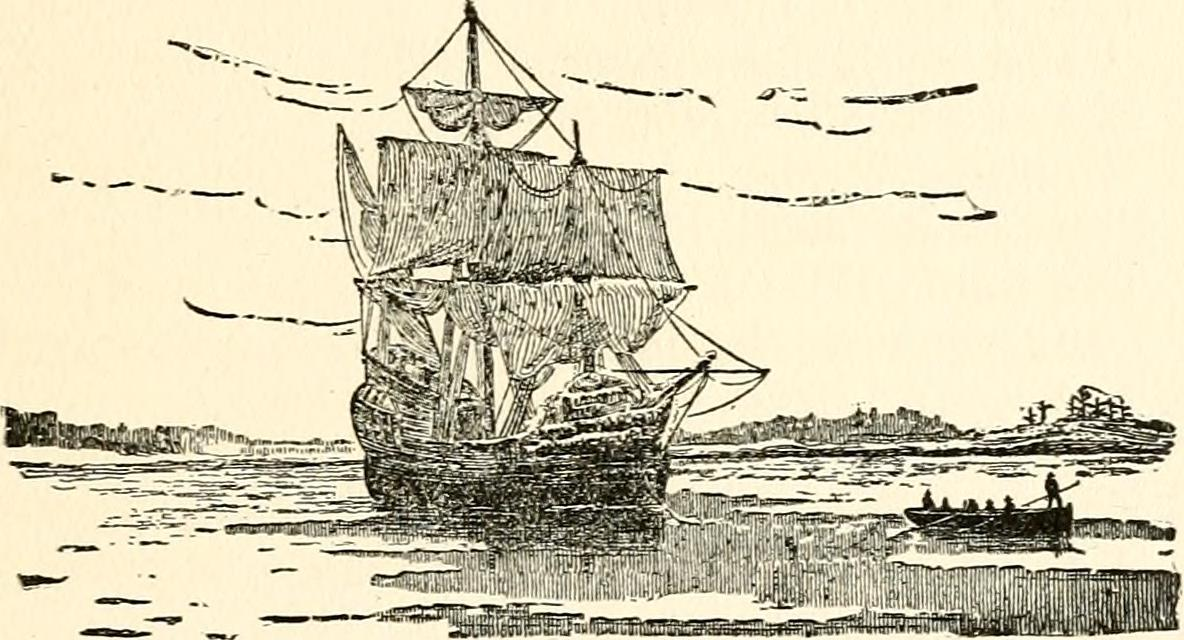
- Mayflower and a shallop scouting a settlement location on Clark's Island
- Born: c. 1574
- Died: 1623 (aged 48–49); Virginia Colony
- Other names: John Clark, Thomas Clarke, "Master Clare"
- Occupations: Mariner, ship's pilot
- Years active: 1609-1623
- Known for: Master's mate of the Mayflower; First Englishman on Clark's Island

John Clarke (or Clark, d. 1623) was an English mariner who traveled to the New World on several occasions. He was captured and imprisoned by the Spanish Empire while in the Colony of Virginia, but returned to sailing after 1616. Most notably, he piloted Mayflower in 1620 to Plymouth Colony. Clarke [sic] is the namesake of Clark's Island near Plymouth Colony.

== With the Virginia Company ==
Clarke was a sailor in 1603 and a ship's pilot by 1607. Clarke was noted in Málaga, Spain in 1609. At some point, he became employed by the Virginia Company.

John Clarke accompanied Sir Thomas Dale's flotilla to Virginia in March 1611, and remained in Jamestown and the Chesapeake Bay area for some time.

== Abduction by the Spanish ==
In May and June, 1611, Clarke was ferrying goods around the Chesapeake Bay settlements. A Spanish caravel came to Old Point Comfort, asking for a pilot to direct the ship into the James River. Three Spaniards came to shore, and Clarke boarded the Spanish vessel. The vessel departed the area to Havana, Cuba, leaving the Spaniards and taking Clarke. Clarke was moved and imprisoned in Seville, Spain, then Madrid. The "English Pilot" was interrogated by the Spanish about conditions in Virginia. He gave varying and contradictory descriptions about the military power of Jamestown. Don Diego de Molina, a Spanish spy who was taken prisoner in Virginia (at the same time John Clarke was seized), later claimed that the fortifications at Jamestown were insubstantial and that "one night the Indians broke in and took the whole place without resistance being made, shooting arrows in at all the doors".

Clarke was delivered back to the English in 1616. By 1618, Clarke was sailing again to Virginia to deliver livestock.

== Transporting Pilgrims to Plymouth Colony ==
Clarke was hired with Master Christopher Jones, mate Robert Coppin, and crew, to sail Leiden Separatists to Plymouth Colony. Clark was 45 years old.

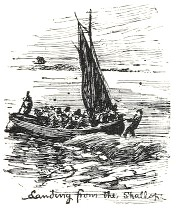
Landing of the Mayflower shallop on Clark's Island

When the Mayflower arrived in Cape Cod in December, 1620, John Clarke was along on an expedition to find a settlement spot using an assembled shallop. The shallop was previously damaged from the Atlantic crossing storms and repaired. On December 8, the shallop's mast and rudder were broken off in a frigid winter storm. Using oars, Clarke and the crew rowed to an unidentified shore.

John Clarke was the first to set foot on Clark's Island. Clarke returned with the crew to England in spring, 1621.

== Settling in Virginia ==
Clarke might have been the father of Thomas Clark who arrived in Plymouth Colony in 1623.

Clarke endeavoured to settle in Virginia, but died soon after arriving.
