= Thomas Faunce (church elder) =

American church elder and record keeper

- Born: 1647; Plymouth Colony
- Died: February 27, 1746 (aged 99)
- Burial place: Burial Hill, Plymouth, Massachusetts, US
- Occupations: church elder and record keeper
- Spouse: Jane Nelson (1672)
- Children: 7
- Parent(s): Patience Morton and John Faunce

Thomas Faunce (c. 1647 – 27 February 1746) was an American church elder, record keeper, and the origin of the Plymouth Rock myth.

== Early life ==
Faunce was born around 1647 in the Plymouth Colony to John Faunce and Patience Morton. His father, John, had arrived in Plymouth in 1623 aboard the ship Anne, just three years after the Pilgrims arrived aboard the Mayflower. Twenty-three original Pilgrims were alive in Faunce's youth, and he grew up hearing stories of their arrival in Plymouth.

== Career ==
In 1686, Faunce was chosen as a deacon of the first church in Plymouth. In 1694, he became a church elder.

At some point, Faunce served as clerk and records keeper of Plymouth.

== Plymouth Rock claims ==
The Plymouth Rock first earned notoriety in 1741 when a wharf was planned to be built, which would bury it. Faunce, aged 94, objected to the construction and claimed that the rock was the arrival site of the Mayflower Pilgrims. He asked to be brought to the rock to say goodbye.

Having pointed out the rock directly under the bank of Cole’s Hill, which his father had assured him was that which had received the footsteps of our fathers on their first arrival, and which should be perpetuated to posterity, he bedewed it with his tears and bid to it an everlasting adieu….

— historian James Thacher

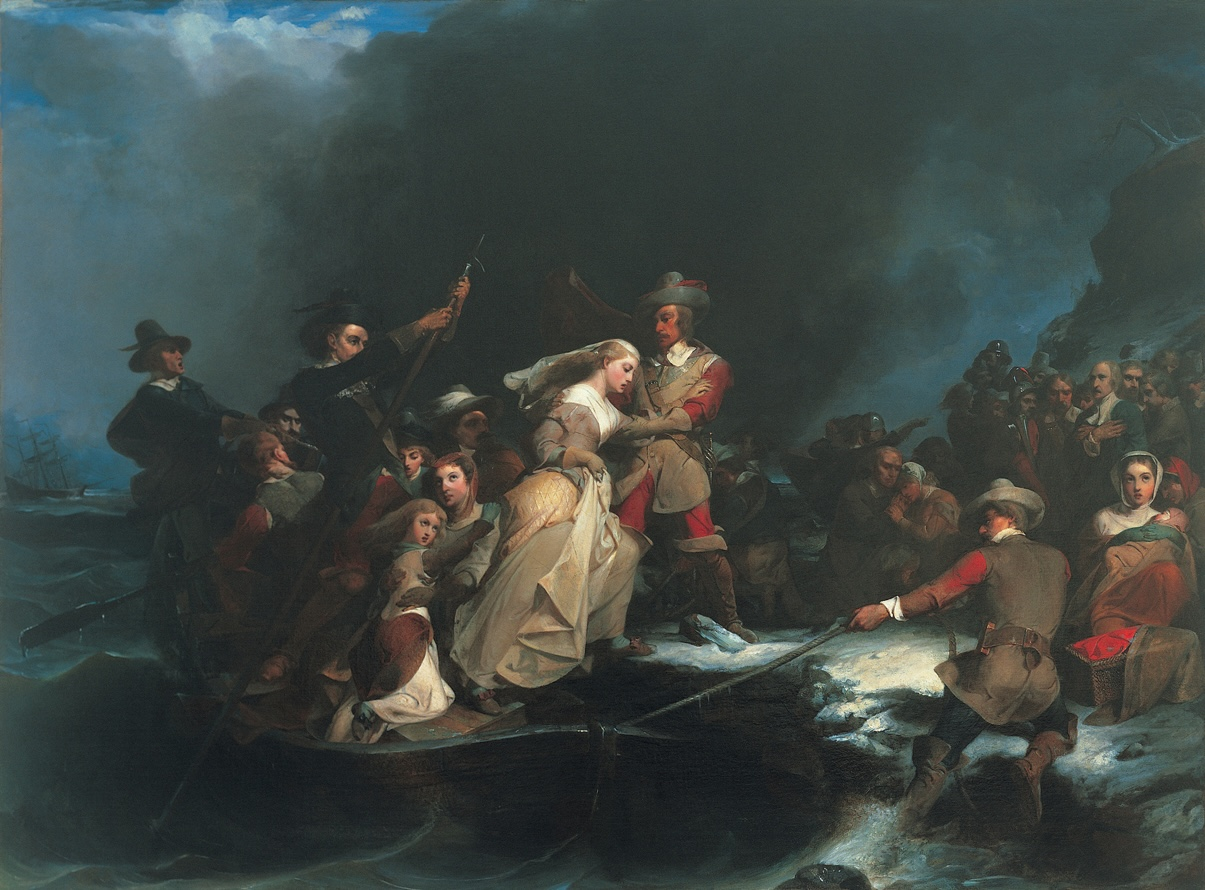
"The Landing of the Pilgrims at Plymouth Rock, 1620" by Peter F. Rothermel, 1854. Oil on canvas.

The people of Plymouth generally believed Faunce's claim due to his proximity to the Mayflower Pilgrims in his youth. The wharf was built, but the rock was left untouched. Over time, the story was popularized.

The authenticity of the rock has since been questioned, as there are no mentions of a stone in any surviving firsthand accounts.

== Personal life ==
In 1672, Faunce married Jane Nelson. They had seven children.

Faunce died on February 27, 1746, at age 99.
