= Nathaniel Morton =

American Separatist settler

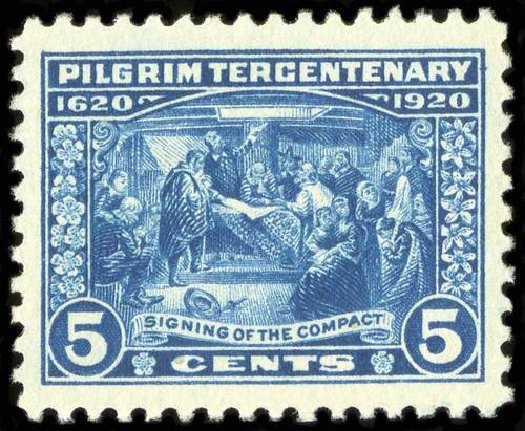
Stamps on tercentenary of signing of Mayflower Compact, 1920. List of signers first printed by Nathaniel Morton of Plymouth Colony in 1669

Capt. Nathaniel Morton (christened 1616 – 29 June 1685) was a Separatist settler of Plymouth Colony in Massachusetts, where he served for most of his life as Plymouth's secretary under his uncle, Governor William Bradford. Morton wrote an account of the settlement of the Colony, the first historical text published in the United States, and was first to publish a list of signers of the Mayflower Compact as well as an account of the first Thanksgiving.

== Biography ==
Nathaniel Morton was the eldest son of George Morton (1585 – 1624) and his wife Juliana Carpenter (1584 – 1665). George Morton was one of the organizers of the Plymouth settlement, and widely considered the principal editor of Mourt's Relation, an early account of the settlement designed to drum up interest in England. Morton's son Nathaniel was born in Leiden, Holland, during the time the Separatists lived there between their flight from England and their eventual migration to Plymouth Colony.

The Morton family sailed for Plymouth on the ship Ann in 1623. After his father's untimely death, Nathaniel was taken into the household of his uncle William Bradford, then governor of Plymouth.

Morton married Lydia Cooper (1615 – 23 Sep 1673) on 25 Dec 1635. They had nine children: Remember, Mercy, Hannah, Eleazer, Lydia, Nathaniel, a stillborn daughter, Elizabeth and Joanna. After the death of Lydia, Nathaniel married Anne Pritchard (ca. 1624 – 26 Dec 1691). Remember Morton, daughter of Nathaniel Morton, married Abraham Jackson of Plymouth, another initial proprietor of the colony. Their descendant Lydia Jackson became the second wife of philosopher, poet and Transcendentalist Ralph Waldo Emerson.

== Colonial Secretary and Historian ==
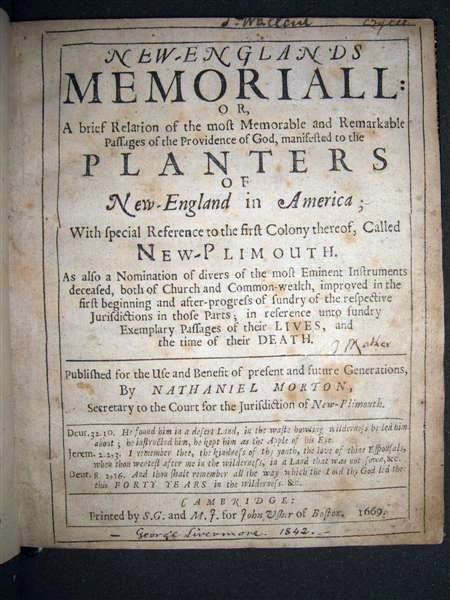
Title page, New England's Memorial, by Nathaniel Morton. Published at Cambridge, Massachusetts, 1669

From December 1645 until his death, Morton was annually elected Secretary of Plymouth Colony, and most of the colony records are in his handwriting. His careful maintenance of the records enabled him to compile New England's Memorial, considered the first comprehensive history of the colony, published at Cambridge in 1669 and widely considered the first book of history published in the United States. Much of Memorial was based on the history of the colony written by Morton's uncle, Gov. Bradford, a manuscript which was lost for many years following the American Revolutionary War, when it was likely appropriated by an English soldier. It later turned up in the library of the Bishop of London in 1855, and was returned to Massachusetts.

Morton also wrote First Beginnings and After Progress of the Church of Christ at Plymouth, in New England.

Annually since 1961, The Wall Street Journal publishes an excerpt from Morton's history of Plymouth Colony as an op-ed the Wednesday before Thanksgiving Day.

Morton was also the first to record the list of signers of the Mayflower Compact in his work of 1669. The document itself was lost.

== See also ==
- John Ratcliff
