= Increase N. Tarbox =

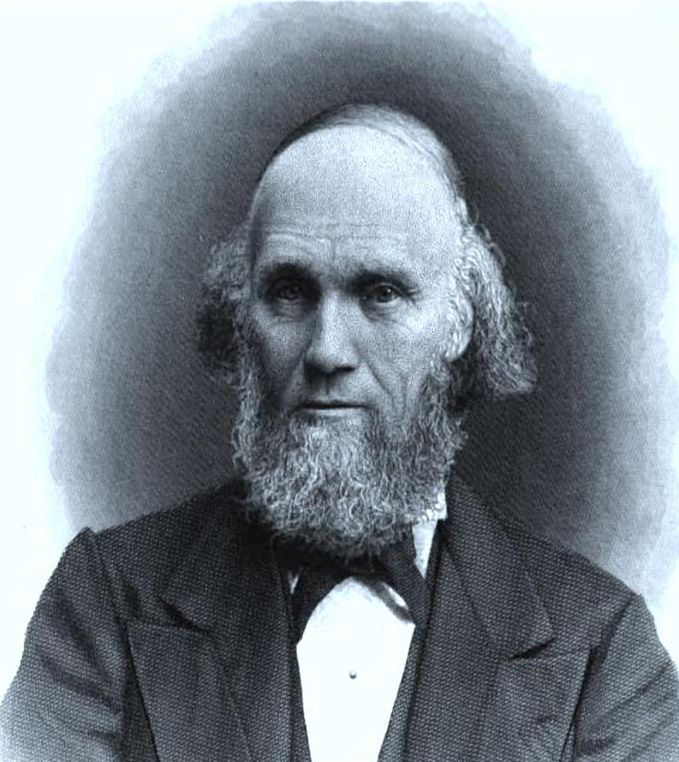
- Engraving of Tarbox from book by H. M. Dexter
- Born: February 11, 1815; East Windsor, Connecticut
- Died: May 3, 1888 (aged 73); West Newton, Massachusetts
- Occupations: Theologian, author
- Theological work
- Language: English

Increase Niles Tarbox (1815–1888) was an American theologian and author.

== Early life ==
Increase Niles Tarbox was born in 1815. He was among the original members of the New England Tarbox Family to rise to political and academic prominence in the region. His relations include U.S. Representative John K. Tarbox, John Tarbox (an important early Massachusetts colonist), and Jack M. Tarbox (an aviation engineer and executive).

Tarbox graduated from Yale University in 1844.

== Career ==
After which he served as pastor of the Framingham, Massachusetts Congregational Church for seven years. He acted as secretary of the American College and Education Society in Boston, Massachusetts until 1884, while completing work for his Doctor of Divinity degree at Yale College. He authored numerous works on the topics of history, religion, and philosophy. Tarbox, a conservative theologian, delivered the dedication address at the Framingham Cemetery in 1848 and delivered the prominent An address on the origin, progress & present condition of philosophy, to the Alpha Delta Phi Society at Hamilton College in Clinton, New York. The Framingham dedication address explained that cemeteries amplify the moral influence of Christianity.

== Death and legacy ==
Tarbox died in 1888. His life was summarized in the biography Sketch of the Life of Increase Niles Tarbox in 1890, by Henry Martyn Dexter, of which two first edition copies are known, one owned by the Harvard library, and the other by his New Hampshire relatives.
