= St Mary's Church, Rotherhithe =

Church in Rotherhithe, Surrey

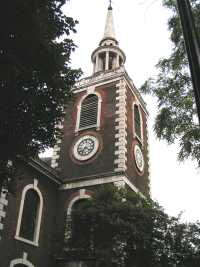
- Tower of St Mary's Church, Rotherhithe
- St Mary's Church, Rotherhithe
- 51.50141°N 0.05394°W
- Location: Rotherhithe, London
- Country: England
- Denomination: Church of England
- Churchmanship: Anglo-Catholic

Architecture
- Heritage designation: Grade II*

Clergy
- Bishop: The Rt Revd Jonathan Baker (AEO)
- Rector: Fr Mark Nicholls SSC

St Mary's Church, Rotherhithe, is the Church of England parish church in Rotherhithe, formerly in Surrey and now part of south east London. The parish is now within the diocese of Southwark and under the jurisdiction of the Bishop of Fulham. The 18th-century church is in St Marychurch Street and is dedicated to Mary, mother of Jesus, and it is particularly proud of its connections with the Pilgrim Fathers. It remains a living and working church, supported by local people and serving a broad community.

== History ==
There is documentary evidence that a church has existed on this site since at least 1282. However, Roman bricks were found when the tower was underpinned in 1913, so it is probable that there were even earlier buildings on the site.

The area was eventually served by Catholic priests from Bermondsey Abbey. Following the break with Rome under Henry VIII in 1538, the vestments, silver and gold plate and other gifts of the cathedral were sold to provide money to repair the mediaeval church.

Some remains of the mediaeval building can still be seen, for example the stone blocks incorporated into the walls on each side of the organ. In the crypt, parts of the old church walls of chalk and flint are visible, and some later Tudor brickwork. A drawing made of this building in 1623 has survived. Although the artist had difficulty representing the perspective of the old church, this drawing is the only remaining evidence of its appearance. A few memorials from the old church have survived.

St. Mary Rotherhithe Act 1716
- Act of Parliament
- Parliament of Great Britain
- Long title: An Act to enable the Parishioners of the Parish of St. Mary, Rotherhith, in the County of Surrey (by certain Funeral Rates therein mentioned), to finish the said Parish Church.
- Citation: 3 Geo. 1. c. 5 Pr.
- Territorial extent: Great Britain

Dates
- Royal assent: 22 June 1717
- Commencement: 20 February 1717 (Note: Start of session.)
Other legislation
Amended by	Rotherhithe Church Act 1737; Rotherhithe Church Act 1766

Status: Amended

Rotherhithe Church Act 1737
- Act of Parliament
- Parliament of Great Britain
- Long title: An Act to enlarge the Term and Powers granted by an Act of Parliament made and passed in the Third Year of the Reign of His late Majesty King George, intituled, "An Act to enable the Parishioners of the Parish of Saint Mary, Rotherhith, in the County of Surrey, by certain Funeral Rates therein mentioned, to finish the said Parish Church;" and to enable the said Parishioners to raise such further Sums of Money as shall be necessary for purchasing a convenient Piece of Ground, for an additional Burial Ground; and for other Purposes therein mentioned.
- Citation: 11 Geo. 2. c. 13
- Territorial extent: Great Britain

Dates
- Royal assent: 20 May 1738
- Commencement: 24 January 1738
Other legislation
Amends	St. Mary Rotherhithe Act 1716
Amended by	Rotherhithe Church Act 1766

Status: Amended

Text of statute as originally enacted

Rotherhithe Church Act 1766
- Act of Parliament
- Parliament of Great Britain
- Long title: An Act for enlarging the Term and Powers granted by Two Acts of Parliament, of the Third of King George the First and the Eleventh of His late Majesty, for enabling the Parishioners of Saint Mary Rotherhith, in the County of Surry, by certain Funeral Rates, therein mentioned, to finish the said Parish Church, and for purchasing an additional Burial Ground; and to enable them to raise Money for purchasing the present Parsonage House, and converting the Site thereof into a Burial Ground, and for providing a new Parsonage House.
- Citation: 7 Geo. 3. c. 74
- Territorial extent: Great Britain

Dates
- Royal assent: 23 March 1767
- Commencement: 11 November 1766
Other legislation
Amends	St. Mary Rotherhithe Act 1716; Rotherhithe Church Act 1737

Status: Current legislation

Text of statute as originally enacted

In 1710, the parishioners of St Mary's petitioned Parliament for a grant to rebuild their church 'which standing very low and near the banks of the Thames, is often overflowed, whereby the foundation of the church and tower is rotted and in great danger of falling'. The petition was not successful but the parishioners went on to collect subscriptions and the local craftsmen, of which there were many, turned their hands and feet to church building.

It was rebuilt in 1714–15, to a design by John James, a major architect of his day (and an associate of Sir Christopher Wren). As money was short, the tower (above right) was not finished until 1747, when Lancelot Dowbiggin, a City joiner and surveyor, completed it, perhaps to his own design, following the general plan of James.

Since then, the external appearance of the church has remained almost unchanged. It is set in a narrow street close to the Thames, surrounded by former warehouses and facing the charity school house which was built in 1703.

In 1760, Birmingham industrialist Matthew Boulton wed his second wife, Anne, here. The two had journeyed far from home to evade ecclesiastical difficulties; she was his first wife's sister, and the marriage was forbidden by canon law, but not void if no one objected when the banns were read.

In 1838, when the well-known ship Temeraire was broken up, some of her timbers were used to build a communion table and two bishop's chairs in the Rotherhithe church.

The interior of the church was much altered in 1876.

Between 1996 and 1999, the bells were restored and re-hung, and essential repairs made to the spire. The bells are regularly rung by members of the Docklands Ringing Centre.

=== Present day ===
St Mary's Church is within the Anglo-Catholic tradition of the Church of England. As the parish is unable to accept the ordination of women, it receives alternative episcopal oversight from the Bishop of Fulham (currently Jonathan Baker).

== The organ ==
St Mary's Church, Rotherhithe is fortunate to possess a fine pipe-organ dating from 1764 installed by the organ builder John Byfield II.

Despite undergoing several modifications over the subsequent years, the present musical instrument retains much of its original character, and its magnificent organ case also remains intact.

A history of the instrument can be found at https://alanjohnphillips.weebly.com/rotherhithe.html#history

== Maritime connections ==
As befits a church near the merchant activity on the river, there are several maritime connections. The communion table in the Lady Chapel and two bishop's chairs are made from salvaged timber from the warship HMS Temeraire. The ship's final journey to the breaker's yard at Deptford was made famous by Turner in his evocative painting The Fighting Temeraire, now in the National Gallery.

In the church a memorial marks the final resting place of Christopher Jones, captain of the Mayflower, which took the Pilgrim Fathers to North America in 1620.

It is also the burial place of Prince Lee Boo of Palau, a Pacific Island prince, and Vice Admiral Sir Thomas Teddeman (c.1620–1668).

Nearby are some of London's Nordic churches and missions to seafarers.

== See also ==
- List of churches and cathedrals of London
