= Henry Morton Dexter =

American historian (1846–1910)

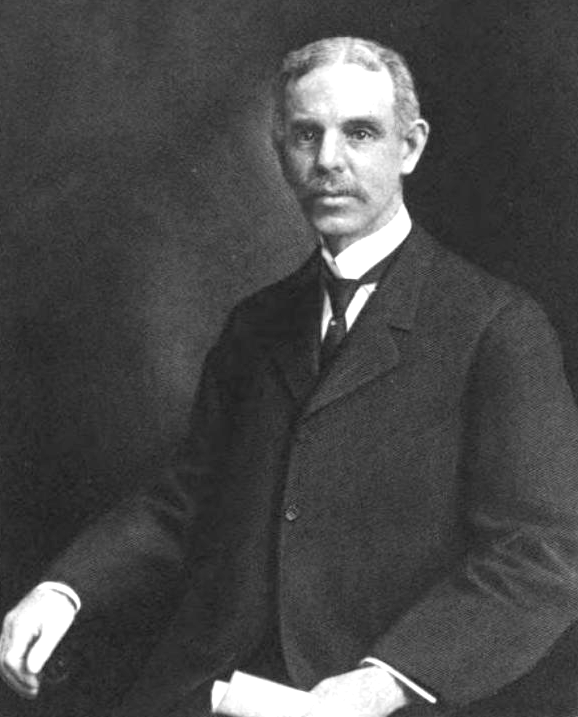
- Born: July 12, 1846; Manchester, New Hampshire
- Died: October 29, 1910 (aged 64); Edgartown, Massachusetts
- Education: Yale University, 1867; Andover Theological Seminary, 1870
- Occupations: Clergyman, historian, editor
- Parent: Henry Martyn Dexter

Henry Morton Dexter (1846–1910) was an American clergyman, historian, and editor.

== Life ==
Henry Morton Dexter was born in Manchester, New Hampshire on July 12, 1846, the son of Henry Martyn Dexter. He graduated from Yale University in 1867, where he was a member of Skull and Bones, and from Andover Theological Seminary in 1870, spent three years in travel, was ordained to the Congregational ministry, serving as pastor of the Union Church at Taunton, Massachusetts (1873–78). From 1878 to 1891, he was editor of The Congregationalist. During several visits to England and the Netherlands he made investigations particularly of the history of the Pilgrims and early American colonists, and he prominently promoted the erection of a memorial tablet to John Robinson at Leyden, Holland, in 1891. His work appeared in New England Magazine.

Dexter died in Edgartown, Massachusetts on October 29, 1910.

== Works ==
- The Story of the Pilgrims Congregational Sunday-school and publishing society, 1894
- England and Holland of the Pilgrims (1905)

== Sources ==
- Yale University. Class of 1867 (1897). Report of the Trigintennial Meeting with a Biographical and Statistical Record. J. G. C. Bonney. pp. 151–.
