= James Thacher =

American physician

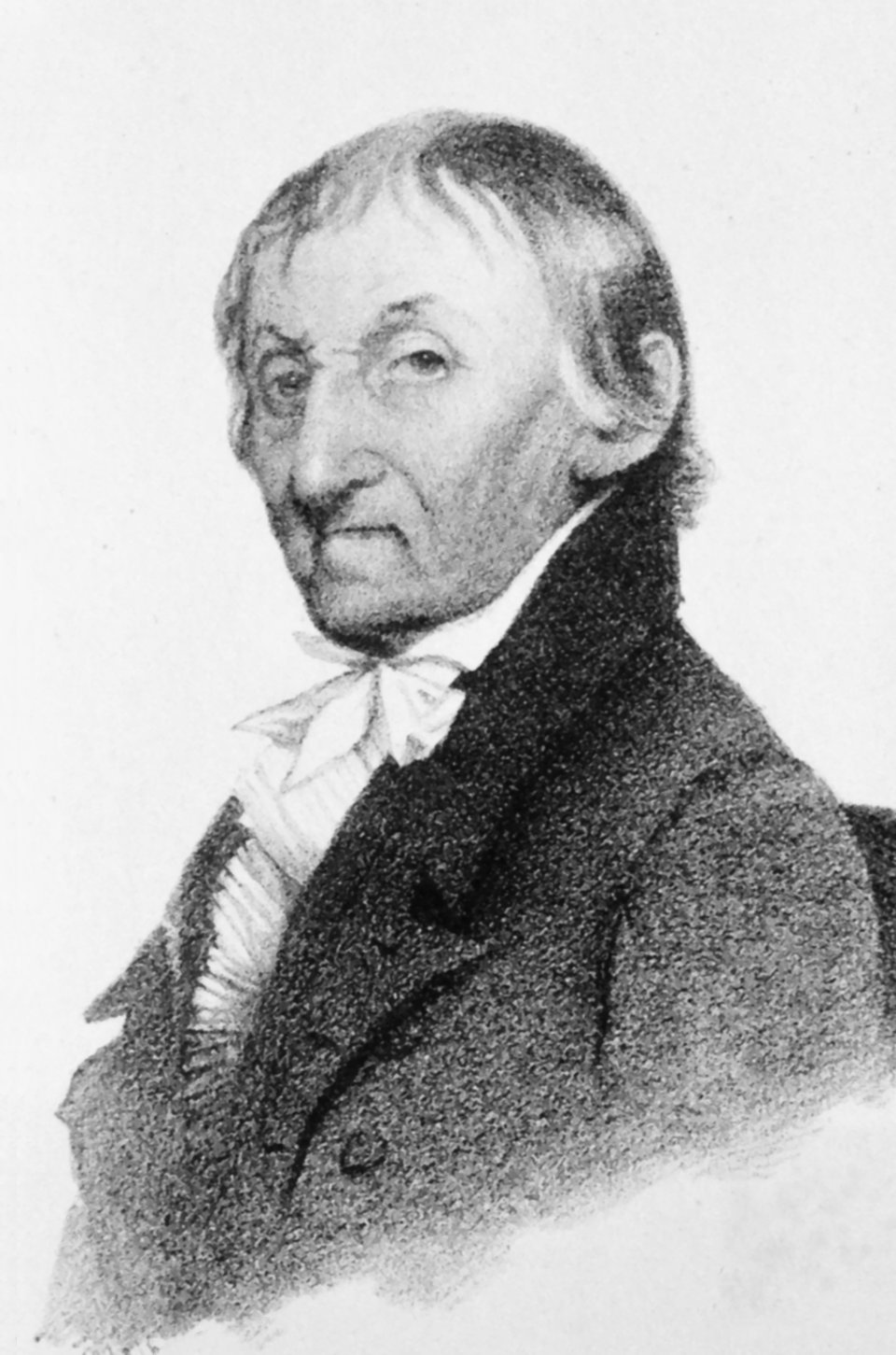
James Thacher

James Thacher (February 14, 1754 – May 26, 1844) was an American medical doctor and writer, born in Barnstable, Massachusetts.

== Biography ==
When Thacher was 16 he became an apprentice for Abner Hersey, a medical doctor from Barnstable, Massachusetts. From 1775 to 1783 he was a surgeon in the Revolution, in the Massachusetts 16th Regiment. Afterward, he practiced in Plymouth, Massachusetts until his death. He was elected a Fellow of the American Academy of Arts and Sciences in 1803.

He was married to Susannah Hayward of Bridgewater, Massachusetts. They had six children. However, only two daughters lived into adulthood.

Thacher was stationed at West Point in 1780 and supported the execution by George Washington of the British spy John André.

== Works ==
- Military Journal during the American Revolutionary War (1823)
- Observations Relative to the Execution of Major John André as a Spy in 1780 (1834)
- American New Dispensatory (1810; fourth edition, 1821)
- History of the town of Plymouth, from its first settlement in 1620, to the present time (1835)
- An Essay on Demonology, Ghosts and Apparitions, and Popular Superstitions Also, an Account of the Witchcraft Delusion at Salem, in 1692, (1831)
- A practical treatise on the management of bees : and the establishment of apiaries, with the best method of destroying and preventing the depredations of the bee moth (1829)
- Several other books.

== See also ==
- Kosciuszko's Garden
