= Mourt's Relation =

Journal of the Mayflower Pilgrims

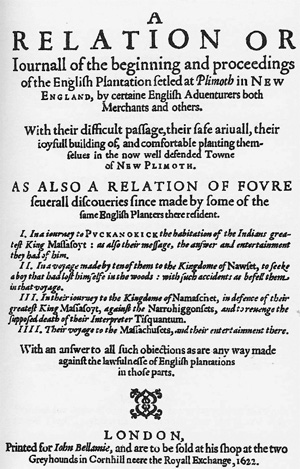
The frontispiece of Mourt's Relation, published in London in 1622

The booklet Mourt's Relation (full title: A Relation or Journal of the Beginning and Proceedings of the English Plantation Settled at Plimoth in New England) was written between November 1620 and November 1621, and describes in detail what happened from the landing of the Mayflower Pilgrims on Cape Cod in Provincetown Harbor through their exploration and eventual settlement of Plymouth Colony.

== Authors ==
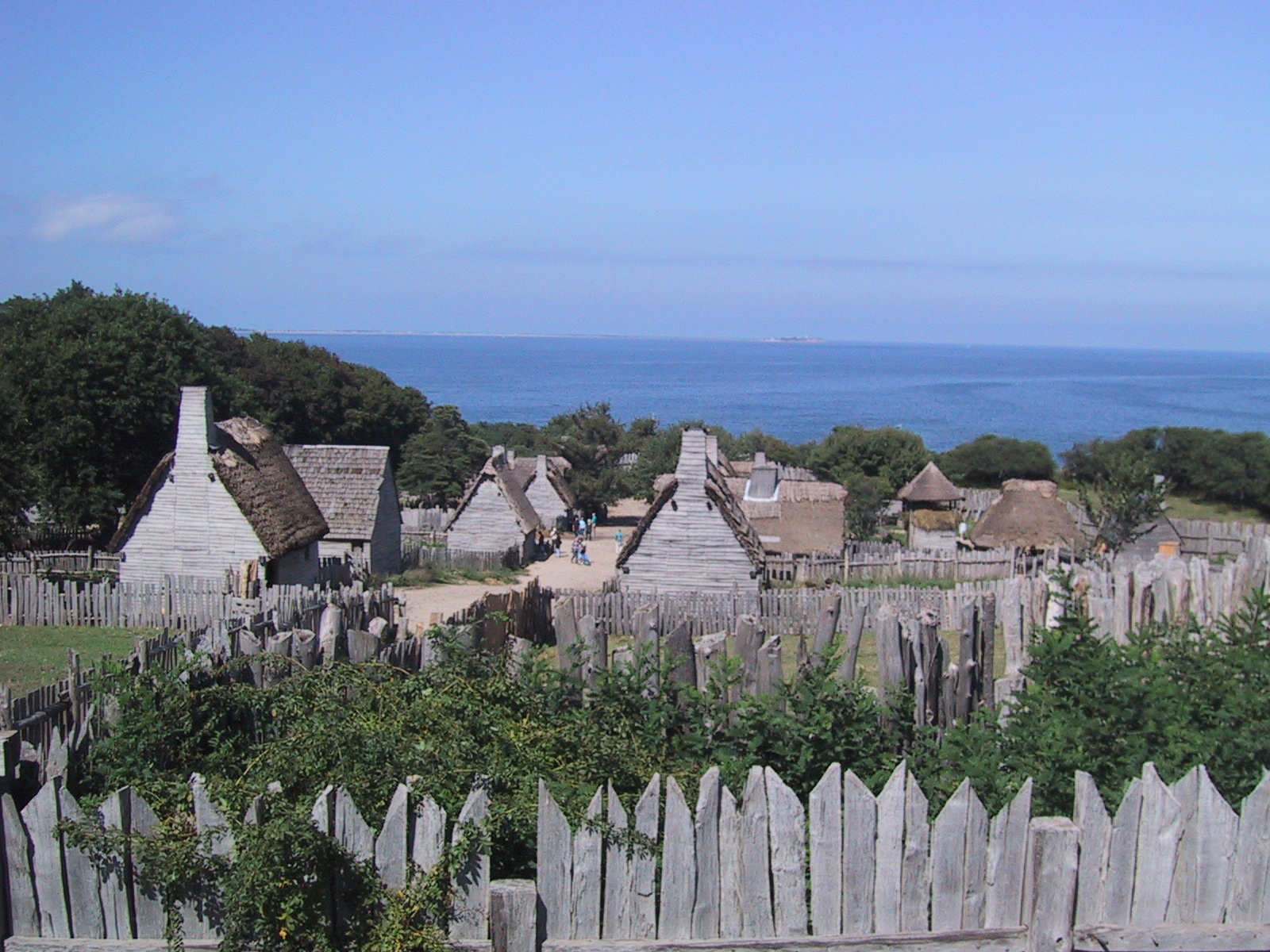
Plimoth Patuxet in Plymouth, Massachusetts

It was written primarily by Edward Winslow, although William Bradford appears to have written most of the first section. The book describes their relations with the surrounding Native Americans, up to what is commonly called the first Thanksgiving and the arrival of the ship Fortune in November 1621. Mourt's Relation was first published and sold by John Bellamy in London in 1622. The tract has sometimes been erroneously cited as "by George Morton, sometimes called George Mourt", which led to its title, Mourt's Relation.

Morton was a Puritan Separatist who had moved to Leiden, Holland. He stayed behind when the first settlers left for Plymouth, Massachusetts, but he continued to orchestrate business affairs in Europe and London for their cause—presumably arranging for the publication of Mourt's Relation and perhaps helping write it. In 1623, Morton himself emigrated to the Plymouth Colony with his wife Juliana, the sister of Governor William Bradford's wife Alice. George Morton would not survive long in the New World, dying the following year in 1624.

George Morton's son Nathaniel Morton became the clerk of Plymouth Colony, a close adviser to his uncle Governor William Bradford who raised him after the death of his father, and the author of the influential early history of the Plymouth Colony "New England's Memorial."

== Legacy ==
A sixty-year long tradition at The Wall Street Journal is to reprint the section on the "first Thanksgiving" on the Wednesday before the holiday.

The booklet was summarized by other publications without the now-familiar Thanksgiving story, but the original booklet appeared to be lost or forgotten by the eighteenth century. A copy was rediscovered in Philadelphia in 1820, with the first full reprinting in 1841. In a footnote, editor Alexander Young was the first person to identify the 1621 feast as "the first Thanksgiving", but this was only because he viewed it as similar to the traditions of New England Thanksgivings that had developed independently from it over the previous two hundred years.

In 1921, a copy sold at auction for $3,800.
