= Henry Martyn Dexter =

American clergyman and writer (1821–1890)

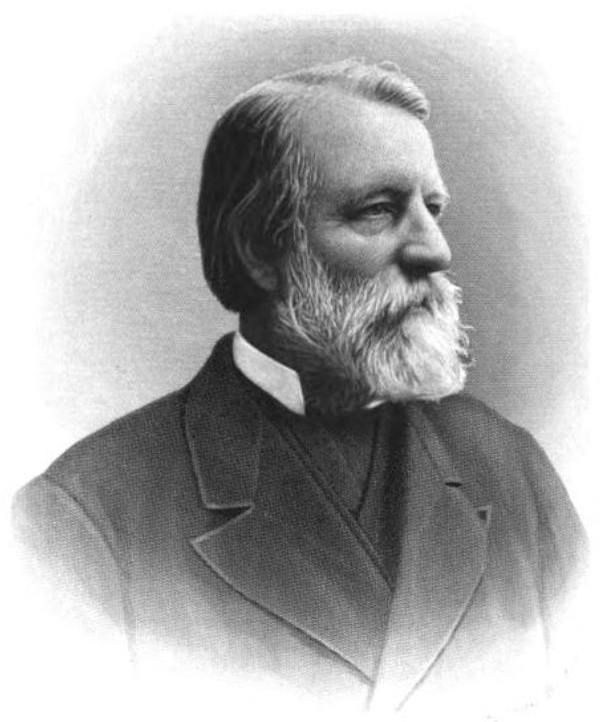
- Born: August 13, 1821; Plympton, Massachusetts
- Died: November 13, 1890 (aged 69); New Bedford, Massachusetts
- Resting place: Forest Hills Cemetery, Jamaica Plain, Massachusetts
- Education: Yale University, 1840; Andover Theological Seminary, 1844
- Occupations: Clergyman, author
- Children: Henry Morton Dexter

Henry Martyn Dexter (August 13, 1821 – November 13, 1890) was an American Congregational clergyman and author.

== Biography ==
Henry Marty Dexter was born in Plympton, Massachusetts. He graduated at Yale in 1840 and at the Andover Theological Seminary in 1844; was pastor of a Congregational church in Manchester, New Hampshire, in 1844–1849, and of the Berkeley Street Congregational church, Boston, in 1849–1867; was an editor of the Congregationalist in 1851–1866, of the Congregational Quarterly in 1859–1866, and of the Congregationalist, with which the Recorder was merged, from 1867 until his death. He was elected a member of the American Antiquarian Society in 1869.

He was an authority on the history of Congregationalism and was lecturer on that subject at the Andover Theological Seminary in 1877–1880.

Dexter died at his home in New Bedford, Massachusetts on November 13, 1890. He left his fine library on the Puritans in America to Yale University.

== Bibliography (selected) ==
In addition to the books listed below, he authored many reprints of pamphlets bearing on early church history in New England, especially Baptist controversies. His The England and Holland of the Pilgrims was completed by his son, Morton Dexter (born 1846), and published in 1905.

- Congregationalism, What it is, Whence it is, How it works, Why it is better than any other Form of Church Government, and its consequent Demands (1865)
- The Church Polity of the Puritans the Polity of the New Testament (1870)
- As to Roger Williams and His Banishment from the Massachusetts Colony (1876)
- Congregationalism of the Last Three Hundred Years, as seen in its Literature (1880)
- A Handbook of Congregationalism (1880) — his most important work
- The True Story of John Smyth, the Se Baptist, told by Himself and his Contemporaries (1881)
- Common Sense as to Woman Suffrage (1885)
- "Sketch of the life of Increase N. Tarbox" (1890)
