= The ships Anne and Little James =

17th century watercraft

In 1623, Anne and Little James were the third and fourth ships financed by the London-based Company of Merchant Adventurers to travel together to North America in support of the Plymouth Colony, following Mayflower in 1620 and Fortune in 1621. Anne carried mostly passengers, while the much smaller Little James carried primarily cargo, albeit with a few passengers as well. After a stormy three-month voyage from England, Anne arrived at New Plymouth in early July 1623, with Little James arriving a week or so later.

Between them the ships brought 90-odd new settlers, along with about thirty others who were not part of the core emigrant group. Many of this emigrant contingent would serve the colony well in the coming years, while others would be judged unfit for the hardships of colony life and be sent back to England.

== Anne ==
Anne was a supply ship of about 140 tons displacement which was used in 1623, along with Little James, to deliver a large party of new settlers to the newly founded Plymouth Colony. Anne was the larger of the two ships and most of the passengers traveled in her. Anne's master was William Peirce, a young man of Ratcliffe, London who was a member of the Adventurers investment group and had made many trans-Atlantic voyages. William Bradford, quoted by author Charles Edward Banks, gives the date of arrival of Anne at Plymouth as being July 10, 1623, with the pinnace Little James's arrival being, per Bradford, “..about a week or so after came in the pinnass (sic).” Author Caleb Johnson reports that Little James arrived in Plymouth on August 5, 1623.

Soon after arrival, the crew of Anne went to work loading whatever timber and beaver skins could be provided as cargo and sailed straight back across the Atlantic to home.

== Little James ==
Little James was a full-rigged pinnace (Note: Two different kinds of sailing ships were commonly referred to by the name "pinnace" during this era: the Little James was the larger kind, a relatively small but a true oceangoing vessel with full-rigged sails, in contrast to the other kind, the even smaller ship's boats of the same name, which served primarily as harbor tenders and were not nearly large enough to sail independently across the ocean.) of forty-four tons displacement, and for her voyage to America she had come brand-new from the builder’s yard. Per Bradford: “a fine new vessel of about 44. tunne, which the Company had built to stay in the Countrie.” She was a small ship with about one-quarter the tonnage of Anne and a total crew of probably not more than fifteen men. Her nominal captain was Emmanuel Altham, a 23-year-old Englishman of the landed gentry from Essexshire, a Merchant Adventurer, and a novice at the business of sailing. The actual sailing of Little James was put in the charge of a master mariner, John Bridges. Little James's primary purpose on the voyage to New Plymouth was to carry company cargo but she did have about fifteen known passengers. In later years Bradford wrote about the little ship that “I fear the adventurers did over-pride themselves in her..for she had ill success.”

When the crew of Little James signed on for the voyage, they agreed to spend six years in Plymouth Colony, but as shareholders instead of wage earners. What they expected was to make money by receiving a share of the ship’s profits from fishing and trading, with the ship’s investors paying for the crew’s food, drink and clothing.

The armament of Little James consisted of six small cannons with a bore of two inches which could fire a ball of a few pounds in weight. Her men had six muskets between them. And because the ship was armed, the crew believed they had a chance to take prize ships of enemy nations such as France or Spain as far south as the West Indies. But the crew was disappointed to find that under the law of the sea, prizes could only be taken if the ship had letters of marque issued by the Crown, and Little James had none. En route from England to Plymouth, Captain Altham refused to capture a French ship sailing home to New Rochelle in France, which caused his crew much vexation.

On board Little James were two crewmen who would go on to cause a great deal of trouble and end up in an Admiralty inquiry: a gunner named William Stephens (or Stevens) and a carpenter named Thomas Fell, both of whom knew how badly the ship needed their services. After arriving at New Plymouth and seeing the shabby state of the colony and condition of the colonists, some working and others merely idling, the crew believed they had been fooled. At that, Stephens and Fell led the crew to go on strike to demand an interim payment of cash. William Bradford managed to calm them down, but only after he offered to personally pay them himself.

Working on the coast of New England, Little James had two major problems. First, the investment company (Merchant Adventurers) had neglected to provide the ship with any trade goods, making it close to impossible to obtain any prime furs to ship to England. Second, the ship was “rudely manned” by a crew that was not happy with their financial situation of being paid in company shares in lieu of true wages.

The Merchant Adventurers who had sent Little James had hoped to have their expenses reimbursed with a trade in furs above all else, as furs were the only item of New World export expected to return a profit. As things turned out, the search for skins was totally futile. By late 1623 things were not going well for the purposes for which Little James was brought to the colony. She sailed around Cape Cod seeking Indian trade relations, and as far as modern Rhode Island, but Altham lacked the quality trade goods that the natives wanted in exchange for furs. Nor could he compete with the very active Dutch traders, who could offer the natives a better price.

As Little James returned from Rhode Island, the weather was calm, so her master anchored the ship at the entrance to Plymouth harbor. A gale quickly arose and the ship lost the grip of her anchors. The ship was headed toward a dangerous sand bank known as Brown’s Bank when the crew chopped through the mainmast and cut away the rigging, thereby saving it. With her mast and tackle gone, the ship anchored again (Johnson reports that anchors were lost), with the anchors holding until the wind changed and she could enter the harbor. The company was forced to provide Little James with a new mast, and refit her with anchors and rigging. Plymouth Harbor is where the ship spent the rest of the winter of 1623–1624, in freezing weather with the crew existing on short rations, apart from some wildfowl and with only cold water to drink, when alcohol was the drink of choice at the time. During that long bitter winter discipline on Little James collapsed completely.

=== The wreck of Little James ===
In the spring of 1624, Altham took Little James east to Maine with a sullen, hungry, and mutinous crew. While anchored at Pemaquid on a fishing and trading expedition, the crew mutinied and threatened Altham and master Bridges with the destruction of the ship. The crew forced Altham to go back to New Plymouth by small boat to find food. With the help of senior Pilgrim Edward Winslow, Altham rushed back to Pemaquid with some bread and peas. They were within a day’s sail of reaching Little James when they found that a second storm had disabled the ship in the harbor at Damariscove Island (now in Maine) where English seamen maintained a small fishing station. On the night of April 10, 1624, during another storm, the ship lost the grip of her anchors on the sea floor once again when wind and waves caused her to crash onto rocks and topple over. As the ship went over, two large holes were opened in her structure, drowning master John Bridges in the wreck and killing two crewmen, John Vow and Peter Morrett, when their escape boat capsized and was struck by Little James's falling mainyard. Again Stephens and Fell mutinied and refused to help save the ship.

Fortunately the masters of several other ships in port at Damariscove were available to inspect the Little James wreck and found she was fit for salvage. They contacted William Bradford offering to salvage the ship if the Colony would meet their bill in beaver skins. Bradford sent the furs and work began with ship’s carpenters and coopers making great water-tight barrels which were tied to Little James and with that help the ship, with rising waters, was lifted off the rocks. All hands worked to haul the ship to a secure location where craftsmen made repairs at great expense to the Company. Within six weeks of the shipwreck, Little James was ready for sea again. But by this time the investors had become thoroughly frustrated by the misadventures of Little James which had become quite costly to repair instead of making a good profit as was intended. At this point William Bradford decided to send the ship and its crew back to England.

The wreck had been a tragedy not only for the ship but also for her captain. In the wreck, the ship had lost her four small boats, very important for doing coastal trading business, as well as her salt, codfish, and all her supplies and trading goods. Captain Altham lost all his precious books and most of his belongings.

When the ship did reach London, Fell and Stephens left it “in the river of Thames in very disordered and evil manner.” They also promptly sued the investor group and Plymouth Colony for forty pounds, in the form of wages that William Bradford had promised and apparently not paid. The monies they demanded amounted to 4–6 years of wages they should have received, notwithstanding the fact that they had mutinied and refused to help the ship and other crew when they were most needed.

=== High Court of Admiralty, November 1624 ===
Lawsuits over Little James began as soon as the ship arrived back in England. The High Court of Admiralty, which had jurisdiction over maritime matters, took custody of the ship and all her goods and furnishings pending the outcome of these lawsuits. Two of the larger investors in the Pilgrim’s joint-stock company, Thomas Fletcher and Thomas Goffe, had invested most of the money involved in building and outfitting Little James, and now wanted possession of the ship as payment for that debt, in addition to crewmen Stephens and Fell wanting their back wages.

Noted Mayflower author Caleb Johnson, writing in the March 2011 issue of The Mayflower Quarterly, provided information from extensive research of English records over the Little James affair. Johnson states that a number of depositions and other Admiralty records have survived in the case of Stephens and Fell vs. Little James. The following is an extract of some of Johnson’s article, including depositions by Edward Winslow.

Surviving depositions were made to the Court by: 1. Edward Winslow, Mayflower passenger and occasional Plymouth Colony governor. 2. William Peirce, master of Anne that came to Plymouth in 1623. 3. Benedict Morgan, one of the passengers on Fortune that came to Plymouth in 1621. 4. Robert Cushman, one of the leading members of the Leiden delegation. 5. James Sherley, one of many investors in the company and later treasurer.

Johnson reprinted in his March 2011 The Mayflower Quarterly article two depositions by Edward Winslow – although the charges to which Winslow had nothing to depose are not stated here – only those of which Winslow had knowledge:

The first deposition by Edward Winslow, dated 17 November 1624, states that he was Edward Winslow of Plymouth in New England, yeoman, aged thirty years or thereabouts. He confirmed that when the Little James arrived in New England, Edmund (sic) Altham was captain and John Bridges master of her and upon arrival in Plymouth the captain and master of the Little James complained about troublesome crewmen Stevens (Stephens) and Fell. This also concerned Stephens and Fell's wage complaint, with Winslow deposing knowledge of their dispute over wages, and also that he heard that the two men did not help during the wreck at Pemmaquid which included loss of the ship’s equipment and stores worth about four or five hundred pounds. He also was deposed about the loss of four shallops (small boats) and another boat lost at another time and negligence of her crew. He also noted an instance of rowdy behavior by Stevens in Plymouth.

In the second deposition by Edward Winslow (undated) he stated that he was an Adventurer investing the amount of “three score pounds in the plantation” .. “and hath been an Adventurer therein since the beginning of it.“ He also confirmed that when the Little James arrived at New England, Stevens was gunner and Fell was the carpenter. Additionally, he confirmed there was a dispute by Stevens and Fell over wages but the sum of the wages he knew not. He also confirmed that when the ship sunk all the ship’s victuals (food stores) perished, but of the crew that did not forsake the ship and “all that would stick to her in distress” were relieved when necessary victuals were provided by neighbor fishermen with payment to be made by the Company which was cleared by the Captain and this respondent (Winslow). Lastly, he deposed that he heard that when the ship was sunk “some of the neighbors thereabouts” did wish all ship crew members “disperse themselves into the Country and work for their passage” and some did disperse themselves “and others stayed by her and labored in the recovery of her.”

By the trading season of 1625 Little James was again sailing the Atlantic in support of Plymouth Colony, investors having sent her and another ship over to fish for cod. At that time, the Colony had debts in the amount of thirteen hundred pounds, and to settle these debts, they needed to ship three thousand beaver pelts to England, this quantity being too far beyond their ability to collect. But the Colony did arrange for Little James to transport about five hundred beaver furs back to England to assist in paying their debts. But in the continuing ill-fortune for Little James, the cargo never reached its intended English port. Somewhere in the English Channel, almost within sight of the English coast, Little James was captured by pirates with all her cargo taken and with the valuable beaver pelts being sold cheaply for four pence each in the North African Barbary pirate bazaars of Algiers or Tunis.

Little James, which was built by the Adventurers to remain in New England, could have been of great assistance to the colonists in matters of trade and fishing, but seemed to have endless ill fortune (see the following for the fate of her captain) which included lack of support by the investors, a mutinous crew, a shipwreck, seizure by the Admiralty Court and creditors in England and finally capture by Barbary pirates. The loss of the ship was something that hurt the Pilgrims greatly, as their harvest had prospered but their trade had not, due to a lack of ships to carry on trade with England, and could only send fur pelts home in small quantities.

== The passengers ==
Per Bradford's later recollection, 60 persons—men, women and children—were on the two ships Anne and Little James combined, although in reality the number of passengers was much more than that. There are no separate passenger lists for Anne and for Little James as those who came over on these ships were grouped together in official records when the 1623 division of land was made for them. But author Charles Banks did identify at least four men, three with families, who were passengers in Little James. Banks goes on to state that it is possible that Little James had more passengers, but due to her size could not accommodate many.
