= Robert Cushman (disambiguation) =

Robert Cushman (1578–1625) was an important leader and organiser of the Mayflower voyage in 1620.

Robert Cushman may also refer to:

- Robert Cushman (curator) (1946–2009), photography curator
- Robert E. Cushman Jr. (1914–1985), U.S. Marine Corps general
- Robert H. Cushman (1924–1996), engineering journalist
- R. A. Cushman (Robert Asa Cushman, 1880–1957), American entomologist

== See also ==
- Cushman (disambiguation)
- Cushman (name), list
