= Robert H. Cushman =

- Born: Robert Herman Cushman; January 26, 1924; Evanston, Illinois, United States
- Died: January 27, 1996 (aged 72); Essex, Connecticut
- Education: Professional Children's School; Rensselaer Polytechnic Institute
- Occupation: Electrical engineering journalist

Robert (Bob) Herman Cushman (16 January 1924 in Evanston, Illinois – 27 January 1996 in Essex, Connecticut) was an American trade magazine journalist who had written extensively across several engineering disciplines, two in particular during the vanguard of rapid technological advances and ensuing market boom of their respective technologies. In the late 1950s, at the beginning of the Space Race, Cushman had been an editor at Aviation Week & Space Technology. From 1962 to the late-1980s, he was an editor for Electronic Design News. He started out at EDN as the East Coast editor and soon rose to Special Features Editor covering microprocessing. Cushman was widely known within the microprocessing industry for his influential writings in Electronic Design News about microprocessors during its infancy in the early 1970s, through its period of rapid growth and development in the 1980s. His articles, collectively, chronicle the birth and early milestones of microprocessors and, at the time, helped bridge technical development with applications. Citations of his work are prevalent in documents produced by academicians, engineers, the military, and NASA.

At the time of Cushman's death, he and his wife were residents of Old Lyme, Connecticut. Before retiring, he and his wife had been a long-time residents of Port Washington, New York.

== Early career ==
Cushman earned a high school diploma in 1942 from the Professional Children's School in Manhattan. After the start of World War II, he entered the U.S. Navy as a Lt. J.G. Upon earning a Bachelor of Arts degree from Rensselaer Polytechnic Institute, he served in China. After the war, Cushman, an avid sailor, spent two years as a yacht designer with Philip L. Rhodes, who later designed the Weatherly. In 1959, after serving as Associate Editor of Automatic Control, Cushman accepted a position as Public Relations Director of Daystrom, Inc., San Diego, which was acquired by Schlumberger in 1962, but continued to operate as a wholly owned subsidiary. Cushman had retired as Senior Editor at Cahners Publishing, a longtime division of Reed Elsevier and, at the time, parent of EDN.

== Growing up ==
Cushman had been a child actor. At the age of fifteen — from January 21, 1939, to June 1, 1939, and from July 17, 1939, to September 23, 1939 — Cushman had acted in the Broadway play, The American Way, in the role of Young Alex Hewitt at that RKO Roxy Theatre. The play ran for 244 performances.

== Selected articles ==
Aviation Week & Space Technology, McGraw-Hill — ISSN 0005-2175

- "GE Bids for Helicopter Market With T58", Vol. 64, No. 23, June 4, 1956, pg. 60
- "Cornell Instruments For Shock Tubes", Vol. 65, No. 18, October 29, 1956, pg. 80
- "Rocket-Tube Ejector Adds To Escape Margin For Jet Pilots", Vol. 65, No. 20, November 12, 1956, pps. 71–77
- "Lewis Pushes Work on Rocket Engines", Vol. 66, No. 22, June 3, 1957, pps. 10–83
- "Air Problems Attacked in Mid-Manhattan", Vol. 67, No. 1, July 8, 1957
- "F-103 Demise Clouds Dual Cycle Future", Vol. 67, No. 10, September 9, 1957, pg. 101
- "GM Seeks 'Fluidity' in $60 Million Engine R&D Facility", Vol. 67, No. 14, October 7, 1957 OCLC 247469174
- "Hypersonic Tunnels Yield Practical Data", Vol. 67, No. 16, October 21, 1957
- "Scientist Study Mach 7 Ramjet Theory", Vol. 68, No. 1, January 6, 1958, pps. 57–59 & 63

Automatic Control, Reinhold Publishing Company — OCLC 2066225

- "Vanguard Control Demonstrates Minimum Hardware Approach", Vol. 9, No. 1, July 1958, pps. 16–20
- "Are Adaptive Servos Here?" 1959
- "Biophysical Feedback For Space Systems", Vol. 10, No. 6, June 1959, pps. 14–24

American Society for Metals

- "Casting Techniques Developed For The Electronic Industry", 1966 OCLC 246210225

16th Annual Wire & Cable Symposium, Atlantic City

- "Die Cast and Mechanical Thermal Pulse Termination Techniques", November 29, 1967 OCLC 227466850

Symposium Record — OCLC 499935577 & Advances in Electronic Circuit Packaging — OCLC 637779919, 220759147
International Electronic Circuit Packaging Symposium (IECPS), Western Electronic Show and Convention (WesCon)
Sponsored by the Institute of Electrical and Electronics Engineers & the Western Electronic Manufacturers Association

- "Mechanical Thermal Pulse Metal Joining", 7th IECPS at USC, August 22–23, 1966, pps. 4–12 OCLC 41782959, 60178667
- "Mechanical Thermal Pulse Multiple Bonding Techniques", 9th IECPS, August 19–20, 1968

The Engineer (published by Western Electric Company)

- "Fluxless Metal Joining", Vol. 10, January 1967

Bell System Technical Journal — ISSN 0005-8580

- "Lead-Acid Battery Techniques for Bonding the Positive Plates", Vol. 49, No. 7, September 1, 1970, pps. 1419–1446 OCLC 4433598564

EDN (formerly Electronic Design News) — ISSN 0012-7515

- "Printed-Circuit Packaging: Can It Be Carried Further?" Vol. 10, No. 9, April 26, 1962, pps. 38–51
- "Hybrid Computation Gets Analog Out of Rut", Vol. 10, No. 21, October 11, 1962, pps. 55–69
- "Heat and Pressure — A Way to Better Bonds, Part I:" January 1967; "Part II" February 1967
- "Hall Effect Put in IC", November 11, 1968, pg. 87
- "Schottky diodes Speed Up Digital IC's", January 1, 1969, pps. 37–40
- "Transistor Responds to Magnetic Fields", February 15, 1969, pps. 73–78
- "Real-Time, Two-Way Communications Between Citizens and Leaders", June 1, 1969, pps. 28, 112, and 113
- "GHz Amplifiers, Now They Are Practical", Vol. 15, No. 2, September 1970, pg. 41
- "Spinel May Make MOS Faster Than T^{2}L", January 15, 1971, pg. 35 OCLC 4926284431
- "Digital Cassettes — Growing Like Wonderful Weeds", Vol. 17, February 1972, pps. 28–35

March 1971 — EDN renamed EDN/EEE

- "Digital Cartridges — New steps in Right Direction", April 1972, pps. 26–29
- "CMSO Finally Gets It All Together", June 15, 1972 OCLC 4926524909
- "Using Computer Aided Design to Talk to Machines in the Factory", August 15, 1972, pps. 28–32
- "Leapfrog Ahead With Standard-Family MSI/LSI", Vol. 18, No. 7, April 5, 1973, pps. 30–38
- "Designers Guide to Optical Couplers", Vol. 18, No. 14, July 20, 1973
- "Microprocessors Are Changing Your Future — Are You Prepared?" Vol. 18, No. 21, November 5, 1973, pps. 26–32.
- "Understanding the Microprocessor is no Trivial Task", Vol. 18, No. 22, November 20, 1973, pps. 42–49
- "Understand the 8-Bit μP: You'll See a Lot of It", Vol. 19, No. 2, January 20, 1974
- "Don't Overlook the 4-Bit μP: They're Here and They're Cheap", Vol. 19, No. 4, February 20, 1974, pps. 44–50
- "What Can You Do with a Microprocessor?" Vol. 19, No. 6, March 20, 1974, pps. 42–47
- "The Intel 8080: The First of the Second-Generation Microprocessors", Vol. 19, No. 9, May 5, 1974, pps. 30–36
- "Microprocessor Design Series": Four reprints from EDN magazine, Vols. 18 & 19, published by Design News, July 22, 1974
- "How to Get Acquainted With a μP", Vol. 19, No. 18, September 20, 1974, pps. 46–52
- "A Very Complete Chip Set Joins the Great Microprocessor Race — Motorola 6800", Vol. 19, No. 22, November 20, 1974, pg. 87
- "Newest μP's Split Into Divergent Paths", Vol. 19, No. 24, December 20, 1974, pps. 31–34
- "Microprocessor Instruction Sets: The Vocabulary of Programming", Vol. 20, No. 6, March 20, 1975, pps. 35–41
- "Exposing the Black Art of Microprocessor Benchmarking", Vol. 20, No. 8, April 20, 1975, pps. 41–46
- "Microprocessor Benchmarks: How Well Does the μP Move Data?" Vol. 20, No. 10, May 20, 1975, pps. 43–48
- "Beware Of The Errors That Can Creep Into μP Benchmark Programs", Vol. 20, No. 12, June 20, 1975, pps. 105–10
- "2-1/2 Generation μPs — $10 Parts That Perform Like Low-End Mini's", Vol. 20, No. 17, September 20, 1975, pps. 36–41
- "Getting Started With Microprocessors on a Shoestring Budget", Vol. 20, No. 19, October 20, 1975, pg. 64
- "How Development Systems Can Speed Up μP Design Process", Vol. 21, No. 8, April 20, 1976. pps. 63–72
- "Bare-bones Development Systems Make Good Learning Tools", Vol. 22, No. 6, March 20, 1977
- "Use Forthcoming One-Chip μC's to Achieve Lower Costs Gracefully", Vol. 23, January 20, 1978
- "Are Single-Chip Microcomputers the Universal Logic of the 1980s?" Vol. 24, January 5, 1979, pps. 83–89
- "The Promise of Analog Microprocessors: Low Cost Digital Signal Handling", Vol. 25, January 5, 1980, pps. 127–132
- "To Get to Know Analog μPs, Simulate Simple Examples", Vol. 25, February 5, 1980, pps. 137–146
- "One-chip μCs, High Level Languages Combine For Fast Prototyping", Vol. 25, No. 14, August 5, 1980, pps. 89–96 OCLC 4928701210
- "Digital Simulation Techniques Improve μP-System Design", Vol. 26, No. 1, January 7, 1981, pps. 142–149 OCLC 4928660815
- "Digital Processing Tools Present Design Challenges", May 13, 1981, pps. 103–109
- "Signal-Processing Design Awaits Digital Takeover", Vol. 26, No. 13, June 24, 1981, pps. 119–128 OCLC 4928661667, 4661381272
- "Digitization Is On The Way For FFT Designs", Vol. 26, No. 15, August 5, 1981, pps. 99–106 OCLC 4928662915
- "Add the FFT to Your Box of Design Tools", Vol. 26, No. 18, September 16, 1981, pps. 83–88
- "As μP/μC Chips Mature, Support Chips Proliferate", Vol. 27, No. 1, January 6, 1982, pps. 155–202 OCLC 4928674427
- "New-Generation CRT-Controller ICs Cut Display Costs, Increase Capabilities", Vol. 27, No. 10, May 12, 1982, pps. 39–46 OCLC 4433265520
- "Digital Signal-Processing ICs ... ", Vol. 27, No. 14, July 16, 1982
- "EDN Product Showcase: ICs and Semiconductors", Vol. 27, No. 14, July 16, 1982
- "Byte-Wide-Memory Standard Gains Adherents as Designers Discover Its Advantages", Vol. 27, No. 15, August 4, 1982, pps. 53–58
- "CMOS Microprocessor and Microcomputer ICs", Vol. 27, No. 19, September 29, 1982, pps. 88–100
- "TTL Enhancements and Extensions", November 24, 1982, pps. 95–102
- "Hands-On Investigations Help Exploit CMOS Designs", Vol. 28, No. 8, April 14, 1983, pg. 13 (7-1/2 pages) OCLC 4926374764, 4660827672
- "Digital Signal Processing Advances Slowly, But Steadily", Vol. 28, No. 14, July 7, 1983, pg. 60–72
- "Hands-On Network-Design Project Gives Insight Into LAN Features", Vol. 29, No. 6, March 22, 1984, pps. 219–232 OCLC 4928688895, 4661412845
- "VLSI-Based LAN-Controller Chip Eases μP-to-Network Interface", Vol. 29, No. 9, May 4, 1984, pps. 207–220 OCLC 4928666410, 4661411667
- "Enhanced μPs Bring New Life to Old Devices", January 1985, pps. 124–138
- "Microprocessor Support Chips Present a Wide Array of Choices", Vol. 30, No. 25, March 7, 1985
- "Third Generation DSPs Put Advance Functions on Chip", Vol. 30, No. 16, July 11, 1985, pps. 59–68
- "Keep Breadboard Simple in Hands-On DSP Projects", September 5, 1985, pg. 225 (10 pages)
- "Support Chips Mature to Upstage the Host Microprocessor", Vol. 31, No. 6, March 20, 1986, pps. 116–167 OCLC 4928696817, 4661423162
- "μP-Like DSP Chips", Vol. 32, No. 18, September 3, 1987, pps. 155–186 OCLC 4928712225
- "New Software Tools Run IBM PC Software on a Variety of 32-Bit μPs", February 18, 1988, pps. 93, 95–97, 100

EDN's Annual Chip Directories

- Fourth Annual Microprocessor Directory, Vol. 22, No. 21, November 20, 1977, pps. 44–83
- EDN's Seventh Annual μP/μC Chip Directory, Vol. 26, No. 20, November 5, 1980
- EDN's Eighth Annual μP/μC Chip Directory, November 11, 1981, pg. 100
- EDN's Tenth Annual μP/μC Chip Directory, Vol. 28, No. 22, November 10, 1983, pps. 111–256
- EDN's Eleventh Annual μP/μC Chip Directory, Vol. 29, No. 23, November 15, 1984
- EDN's 14th Annual μP/μC Chip Directory, Vol. 32, No. 24, November 26, 1987, pps. 100–187 OCLC 4928712791

== Professional affiliations and hobbies ==
- Member, International Society of Automation, since the late 1950s
- Cushman filed several patents and copyrights

Selected stage plays & screenplays

- Judson Mansions or The Barbarians, A melodrama in three acts, 30 March 1950
- The Scientific Approach to Getting Married in a Hurry, a filmplay by Robert Herman Cushman, 7 November 1963

== Ancestry and family ==
Notable ancestry

Cushman, by way of his father, Clifford Howell Cushman (1891–1974), was a tenth-generation lineal descendant of Thomas Cushman (1608–1691) and wife, Mary Allerton (1616–1699) — settlers of the Plymouth Colony. The lineage is all paternal, hence the same surname. (Note: Thomas Cushman & Mary Allerton (1st), Thomas Cushman (2nd: 1637–1726), Benjamin Cushman (3rd: 1691–1770), Caleb Cushman (4th: 1715–1778), Gideon Cushman (5th: 1750–1845), Caleb Cushman (6th: 1779–1859), Alexander Cushman (7th: 1812–1880), Herman Alexander Cushman (8th: 1863–1933), Clifford Howell Cushman (9th: 1891–1974), Robert Herman Cushman (10th: 1924–1996)) Mary Allerton was a passenger on the Mayflower, the first ship to arrive in Plymouth in 1620. Thomas Cushman was a passenger on the Fortune, the second ship to arrive in 1621. Cushman was also an eleventh generation lineal descendant of Francis Eaton, also a passenger on the Mayflower and settler of Plymouth (Note: Francis Eaton & Christian Penn (1st), Benjamin Eaton, Sr. (2nd: 1627–1712), Benjamin Eaton, Jr. (3rd: 1664–1739), Sarah Eaton (4th: 1695–1737, married to Benjamin Cushman; 1691–1770), Caleb Cushman (5th: 1715–1778), Gideon Cushman (6th: 1750–1845), Caleb Cushman (7th: 1779–1859), Alexander Cushman (8th: 1812–1880), Herman Alexander Cushman (9th: 1863–1933), Clifford Howell Cushman (10th: 1891–1974), Robert Herman Cushman (11th: 1924–1996)) — a fourth generation female descendant of Francis Eaton married a third generation descendant of Robert and Mary Cushman.

Nowadays, tens of millions of Americans have at least one ancestor from the Plymouth Colony, many of whom affiliated with the Mayflower Society. But, according to Galton-Watson probability, only a fraction of that number have an unbroken chain of paternal lineage maintaining the same surname.

Family

Cushman married Rose Katherine Clausing October 4, 1952, in Butler County, Ohio. They had a daughter and a son and remained married forty-three years, until his death.
