= Cushman (name) =

Cushman is both a surname and a given name. Notable people with the name include:

== Surname ==
- Austin F. Cushman (1830–1914), American tool inventor
- Charles W. Cushman (1896–1972), American photographer
- Charlie Cushman (1850–1909), American baseball umpire and manager
- Charlotte Cushman (1816–1876), American stage actress
- David Cushman (1939–2000), American chemist
- Doug Cushman (born 1953), American cartoonist
- Francis W. Cushman (1867–1909), American politician
- Jeremy Cushman (born 1990), American violinist
- J. Clydesdale Cushman (1887–1955), American real estate executive, co-founder of Cushman & Wakefield
- Joseph Augustine Cushman (1881–1949), American paleontologist
- Harvey Cushman (1877–1920), baseball player
- Karen Cushman (born 1941), American writer
- Leah Cushman, American politician
- Mary Floyd Cushman (1870–1965), American medical doctor and missionary
- Pauline Cushman (1833–1897), American actress and Civil War spy
- Priscilla Cushman, American physicist
- Robert Cushman (1578–1625), Plymouth Colony Pilgrim
- R. A. Cushman (1880–1957), American entomologist
- Robert E. Cushman Jr. (1914–1985), U.S. Marine Corps general
- Robert H. Cushman (1924–1996), American engineering journalist
- Robert Cushman (curator) (1946–2009), photography curator for the Academy of Motion Picture Arts and Sciences
- Susan Cushman (born 1972), Canadian rhythmic gymnast

== Given name ==
- Cushman Kellogg Davis (1838–1900), American politician
- Arthur Cushman McGiffert (1861–1933), American theologian
- Robert Cushman Murphy (1887–1973), American ornithologist

== Fictional characters ==
- Frank Cushman, in the film Jerry Maguire; portrayed by Jerry O'Connell
