= Speedwell (1577 ship) =

Ship that carried Pilgrims from Holland to England

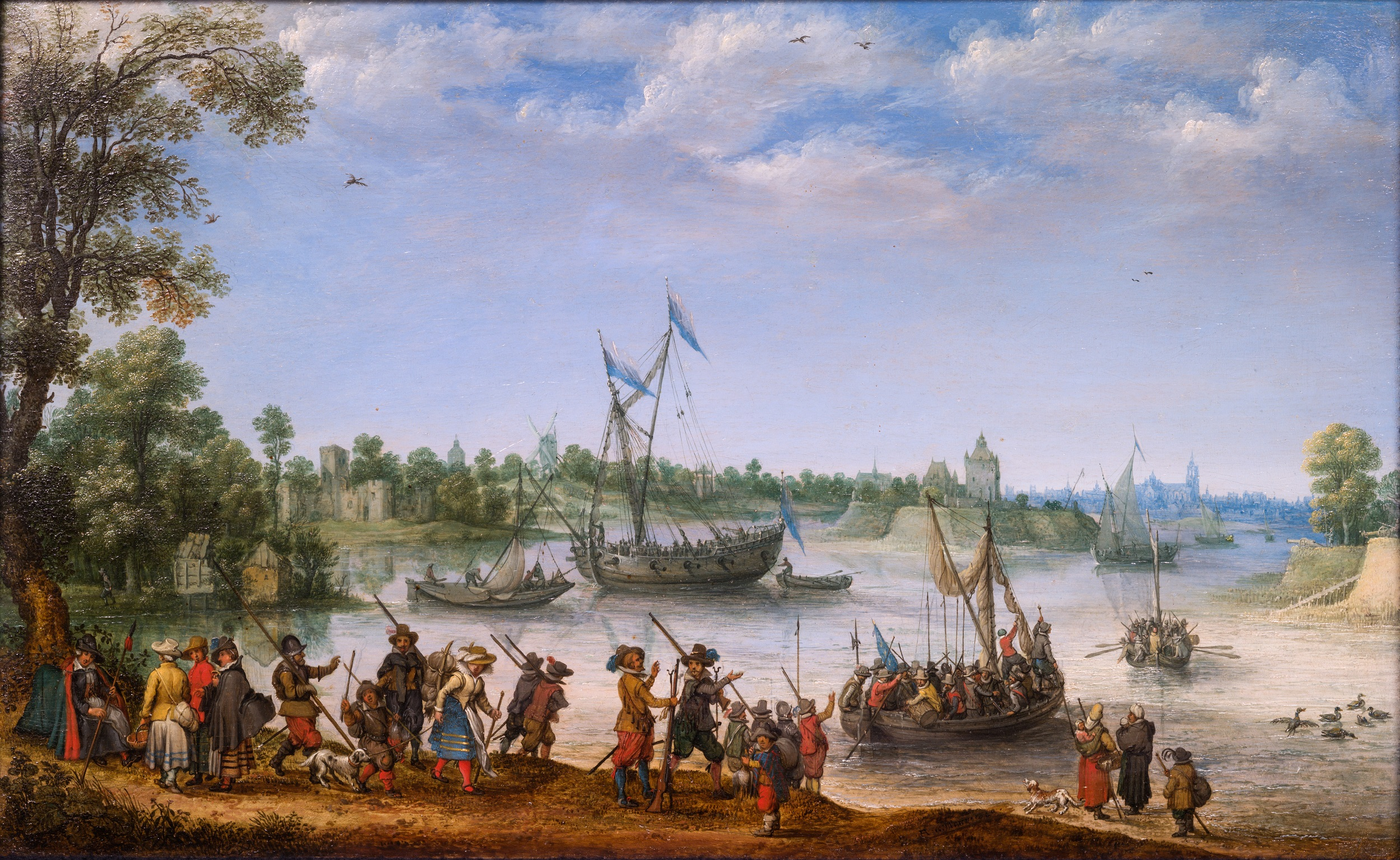
- Speedwell departing Delftshaven by Adam Willaerts c. 1620

History
- Name: Swiftsure (1577–1605); Speedwell (1605–)
- Namesake: Veronica sp. (speedwell)
- Launched: 1577

General characteristics
- Tonnage: 60 tons

Speedwell was a 60-ton pinnace that carried a band of English Dissenters now popularly called the Pilgrims from Leiden, Holland, to England, whence they intended to sail to America aboard both the Speedwell and the Mayflower in 1620. The Pilgrims initially set sail in both ships, but Speedwell was found to be unseaworthy and both ships returned to England. The Pilgrims later left Speedwell behind and sailed on the Mayflower alone.

== Swiftsure ==
Speedwell was built in 1577, under the name Swiftsure, as part of English preparations for war against Spain. She participated in the fight against the Spanish Armada. During the Earl of Essex's 1596 Azores expedition she served as the ship of his second in command, Sir Gelli Meyrick. After hostilities with Spain ended, she was decommissioned in 1605 and renamed Speedwell, after the UK wildflower but also a play on words for her desired ability.

== Speedwell ==
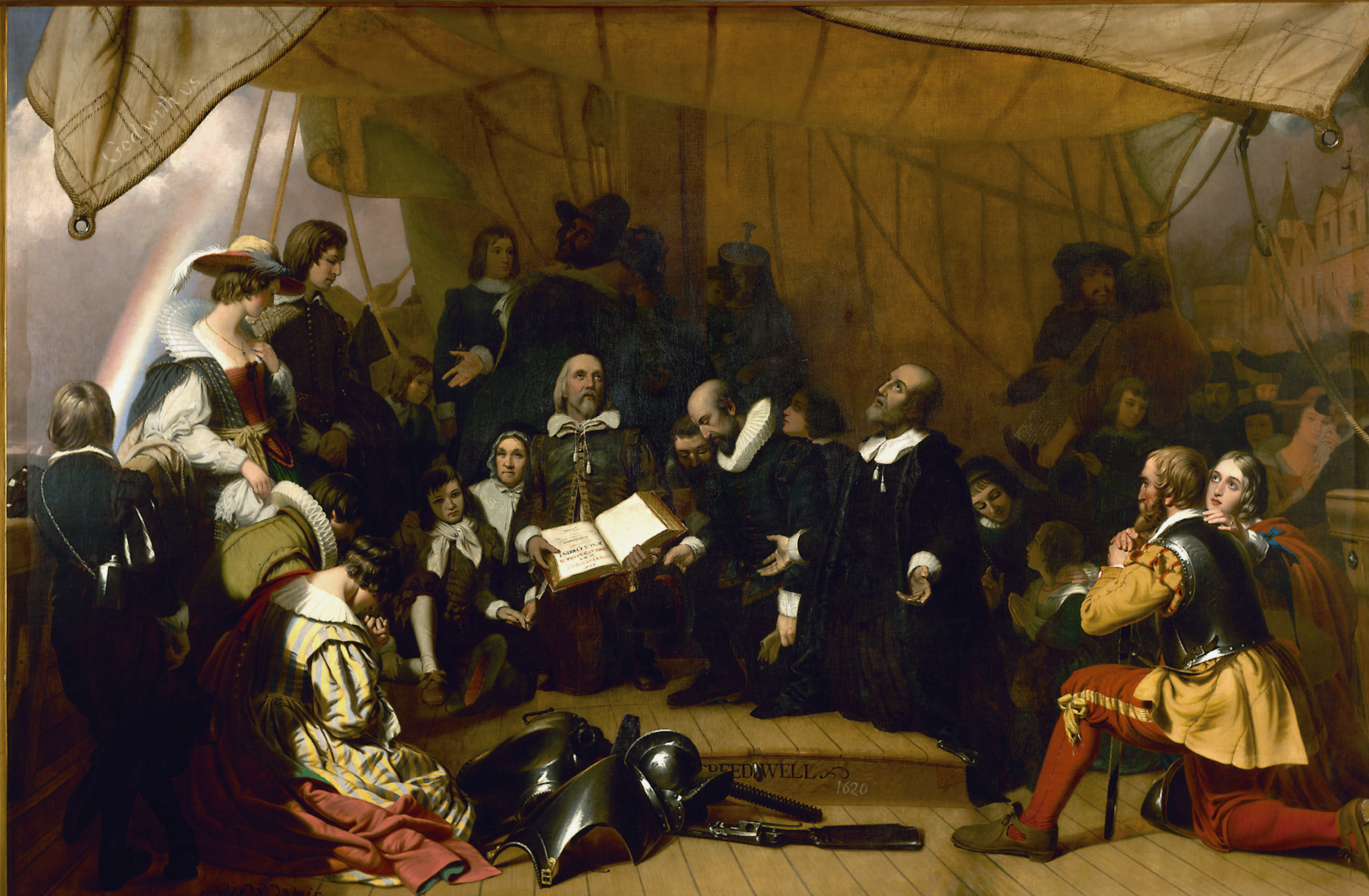
The Embarkation of the Pilgrims, 1843, US Capitol Rotunda. The name of the ship, Speedwell, and 1620 are written in the foreground of the painting.

The Leiden Separatists bought the ship in Holland in 1620. They then sailed under the command of Captain Reynolds to Southampton, England to meet the sister ship, Mayflower, which had been chartered by merchant investors. In Southampton they joined with other Separatists and the additional colonists hired by the investors. Speedwell was already leaking. The ships lay at anchor in Southampton almost two weeks while Speedwell was being repaired and the group had to sell some of their belongings, food and stores, to cover costs and port fees.

The two ships began the voyage on 5 August 1620, but Speedwell was found to be taking on water, and the two ships put into Dartmouth in Devon for repairs. On the second attempt, Mayflower and Speedwell sailed about 100 leagues (about 300 nautical miles (560 km; 350 mi)) beyond Land's End in Cornwall, but Speedwell was again found to be taking on water. Both vessels returned to Dartmouth in Devon. The Separatists decided to go on to America on Mayflower. According to Bradford, Speedwell was sold at auction in London, and after being repaired made a number of successful voyages for her new owners. At least two of her passengers, Thomas Blossom and a son, returned to Leiden.

Prior to the voyage, Speedwell had been refitted in Delfshaven (Rotterdam) and had two masts. Nathaniel Philbrick theorizes that the crew used a mast that was too big for the ship, and that the added stress caused holes to form in the hull. William Bradford wrote that the "overmasting" strained the ship's hull, but attributes the main cause of her leaking to actions on the part of the crew. Passenger Robert Cushman wrote from Dartmouth in August 1620 that the leaking was caused by a loose board approximately two feet long.

Eleven people from Speedwell boarded Mayflower, leaving 20 people to return to London (including Cushman) while a combined company of 102 continued the voyage. For a third time, Mayflower headed for the New World. She left Plymouth on 6 September 1620 and entered Cape Cod Bay on 11 November. Speedwell's replacement, Fortune, eventually followed, arriving at Plymouth Colony one year later on 9 November 1621. Philippe de Lannoy on Speedwell made the trip.

The ship was apparently in use by the Royal Navy in 1624 when it was used by Royal Navy Captain John Chudleigh (MP for Lostwithiel) to transport the German commander Ernst von Mansfeld to London.

Under the ownership of Captain John Thomas Chappell, the Speedwell sailed again on 28 May 1635 from Southampton, finally arriving in Virginia. The ship then returned to England and was then refitted and sold.

== Speedwell in art ==
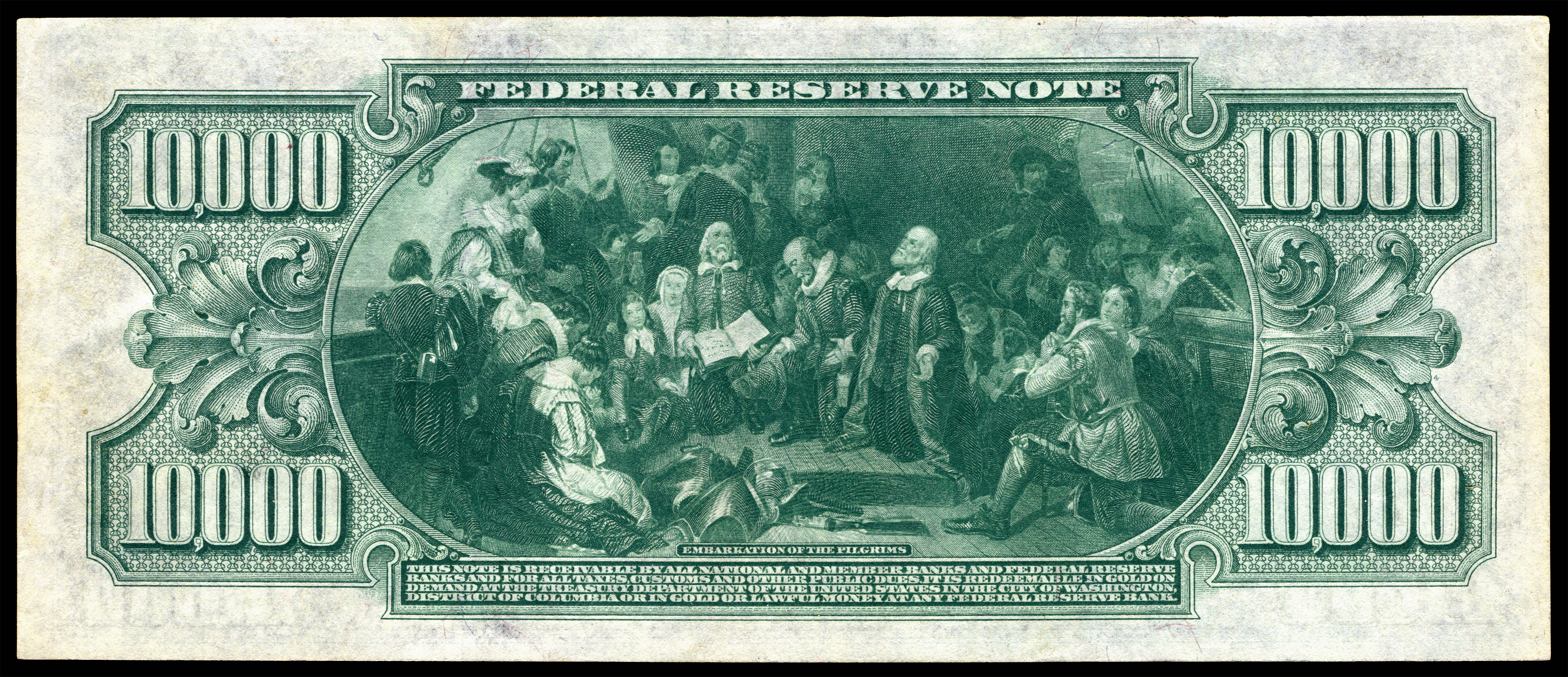
The reverse of the $10,000 bill shows a scene from Weir's painting of Speedwell.

In 1837, Robert Walter Weir was commissioned by the United States Congress to paint an historical depiction of the Pilgrims. This painting was placed in the U.S. Capitol Rotunda at Washington, D.C. in December 1843. Known as The Embarkation of the Pilgrims, the 12 by 18 feet (3.7 by 5.5 m) painting is a scene on board Speedwell while harboured in Delfshaven, Holland. The historical event dramatized took place on 22 July 1620. Weir would later paint another, much smaller oil on canvas that is now displayed in the Brooklyn Museum of Art. The paintings are similar except for lighting and a few minor changes. The 1857 work measures about 4 by 6 feet (1.2 by 1.8 m). The Embarkation of the Pilgrims is depicted on the reverse of the 10,000 dollar bill (Federal Reserve Note) issued in 1918. Only five examples of this bill are known, and "none exist outside of institutional collections."

== Speedwell in fiction ==
A fiction based on fact novel, A Spurious Brood outlines a possible explanation for the sabotage of Speedwell, based on the true story of Katherine More, whose children were sent to America on board Mayflower. In Hornblower and the Atropos, one of the C. S. Forester novels about fictional British naval officer Horatio Hornblower, a treasure ship named Speedwell has sunk in Turkey's Marmorice Bay, and Hornblower's mission is to recover the treasure from the bottom of the bay. Speedwell is also mentioned several times in battle-action scenes in the historical fiction novel, Armada: A Novel, written by Charles Gidley Wheeler and published in 1987. In the 1987 Larry Cohen film A Return to Salem's Lot, which serves as a sequel to the 1979 miniseries Salem's Lot, the Speedwell did not sink and was the ship upon which vampires arrived in the New World.

== Sources ==
- Ames, Azel (1907). The Mayflower and her Log. New York: Houghton, Mifflin – via Gutenberg Project.
- White, Henry (1859). Indian Battles: with Incidents in the Early History of New England. New York: D.W. Evans & Co.
- Bradford, William (1908). "The 8. Chap.". In Davis, William T. (ed.). Bradford's History of Plymouth Plantation, 1606–1646. Original Narratives of Early American History. New York: Charles Scribner's Sons. p. 87. ISBN 978-0722266441.
- Harvey, Robert Paton (1982). "Where Currant Bushes Grew: An Introduction to the Sackville Fultzes". Nova Scotia Historical Review. 2 (1): 12.
