= Mary Allerton =

Mayflower passenger (1616–1699)

Mary Allerton Cushman
- Born: June 1616; Leiden, South Holland, Netherlands
- Died: 28 November 1699 (aged 83); Plymouth, Colony of Massachusetts (England)
- Spouse: Thomas Cushman (m. 1636)
- Children: 8

Mary Allerton Cushman's grave on Burial Hill

Mary Allerton Cushman (c. 1616 – 28 November 1699) was a settler of Plymouth Colony in what is now Massachusetts. She was the last surviving passenger of the Mayflower. She arrived at Plymouth on the Mayflower when she was about four years old and lived there the rest of her life; she died aged 83.

Mary Allerton was born about 1616 in Leiden, The Netherlands to parents Isaac and Mary Norris Allerton. According to some sources, she was baptised in June 1616. She came to Plymouth on the Mayflower in 1620, at about the age of four. Around 1636, she married Thomas Cushman, who had come to Plymouth in 1621 at the age of thirteen on the ship Fortune with father Robert Cushman, a prominent member of the Pilgrims' congregation in Leiden. Thomas and Mary had a prosperous family. Seven of their eight children survived to adulthood, got married, and provided at least 50 grandchildren. Thomas and Mary both lived to an old age, never moving from Plymouth. Thomas died in December 1691, reaching nearly 85 years in age. Mary, who gave birth to and raised eight children, lived to the age of 83. Prior to her death in November 1699, she was the last surviving Mayflower passenger. She was buried on Burial Hill in Plymouth.
