= Cushman =

Cushman may refer to:

- Cushman (name)
- Cushman (company), an American vehicle manufacturer
- Cushman (mango), a mango cultivar

== Places in the United States ==
- Cushman, Arkansas, a city in Arkansas
- Cushman, Michigan, a ghost town
- Cushman, Oregon, a city in Oregon
- Lake Cushman, Washington, a city in the state of Washington
- Lake Cushman, a lake in Washington
  - Cushman Dam No. 1, a dam that forms Lake Cushman
  - Cushman Dam No. 2, a dam that forms Lake Kokanee

== See also ==
- Cushman & Wakefield, a real estate firm
- Robert Cushman Murphy Junior High School
- The Cushman School, Miami, Florida, US
