= Moses Simonson =

Dutch-American settler

Moses Simonson (c. 1605 – c. 1690), also known as Moyses Simonson or Symonson or Moses Simmons, was one of the earliest settlers of New England as one of the passengers of 1621 Fortune voyage and would have been present at the time of the Pilgrims First Thanksgiving in 1621. According to several sources, Moses Simonson, may have had Jewish ancestry.

Moses Simonson was born around 1605 in Holland, and according to Edward Winslow in Hypocrasie Unmasked, one of Simonson's parents was a member of the Pilgrims' Separatist church in Leiden, and according to DNA testing, Winslow may have had family with the Simmons name as well. Several sources have presumed that Simons was also of at least partial Jewish (or Converso) ancestry based partially upon his name and Dutch origin. In 1621 Simonson arrived in Plymouth, Massachusetts on the Fortune in 1621 as an unmarried man and received two acres in the 1623 land division as “Moyses Simonson” which he shared with Philipe de la Noye. Simonson became a member of the 1626 Purchaser investment group as “Moyses Symonson.” In the 1627 cattle division as “Moyses Simonson” he shared two acres with Philipe de la Noye. By the time of the 1633 tax list, Simonson shortened his name to "Simmons." By 1639, Simson settled in Duxbury, Massachusetts and served as a surveyor. He moved to Duxbury and married "Sarah" by 1639 with whom he had at least seven children. Simons' eldest daughter, Rebecca, married John Soule, the son of Pilgrim, George Soule, who is also believed to be of Dutch and possibly Jewish ancestry. A direct descendant of Simonson, founded Simmons University in Boston.
