= EDN (magazine) =

American trade journal

- Cover of EDN magazine
- Editor: Majeed Ahmad
- Categories: Trade magazine
- Founded: May 1956; 70 years ago (as Electrical Design News)
- Final issue: June 2013 (print)
- Company: AspenCore Media
- Country: United States
- Language: English
- Website: edn.com
- ISSN: 0012-7515

EDN is an electronics industry website and formerly a magazine owned by AspenCore Media, an Arrow Electronics company. The editor-in-chief is Majeed Ahmad. EDN was published monthly until, in April 2013, EDN announced that the print edition would cease publication after the June 2013 issue.

== History ==
it was the first issue of Electrical Design News, the original name, was published in May 1956 by Rogers Corporation of Englewood, Colorado. In January 1961, Cahners Publishing Company, Inc., of Boston, acquired Rogers Publishing Company. In February 1966, Cahners sold 40% of its company to International Publishing Company in London In 1970, the Reed Group merged with International Publishing Corporation and changed its name to Reed International Limited moms.

Acquisition of EEE magazine
Cahners Publishing Company acquired Electronic Equipment Engineering, a monthly magazine, in March 1971 and discontinued it. In doing so, Cahners folded EEE's best features into EDN, and renamed the magazine EDN/EEE. At the time, George Harold Rostky (1926–2003) was editor-in-chief of EEE. Rostky joined EDN and eventually became editor-in-chief before leaving to join Electronic Engineering Times as editor-in-chief.

Taking EDN worldwide
Roy Forsberg later became editor-in-chief of EDN magazine. He was later promoted to publisher and Jon Titus PhD was named editor-in-chief. Forsberg and Titus established EDN Europe, EDN Asia and EDN China, creating one of the largest global circulations for a design engineering magazine. EDN's 25th anniversary issue was a 425-page folio.

Reed Limited acquires remaining interest in Cahners
In 1977, Reed acquired the remaining interest in Cahners, then known as Cahners Publications. In 1982, Reed International Limited changed its name to Reed International PLC. In 1992, Reed International merged with Elsevier NV, becoming Reed Elsevier PLC on January 1, 1993. Reed Business Media then removed the Cahners Business Publishing name to rebrand itself as Reed Business Information.

Reed sells EDN to Canon Communications LLC, Canon acquired by United Business Media, UBM sells EDN to AspenCore Media
Reed Business Information, part of Reed Elsevier, sold the magazine to Canon Communications LLC in February 2010. United Business Media, now UBM LLC, acquired Canon Communications LLC in October 2010. On June 3, 2016, UBM announced that EE Times, along with the rest of the electronics media portfolio (EDN, Embedded.com, TechOnline and Datasheets.com) was being sold to AspenCore Media, a company owned by Arrow Electronics, for $23.5 million. The acquisition was completed on August 1, 2016.

On April 9, 2013, UBM announced that EDN's print edition would cease publication after the June 2013 issue and that the online EDN.com community would continue.

Michael Dunn led EDN through mid-2018. Santo succeeded him shortly thereafter and Majeed Ahmad became Editor-in-Chief in August 2020.

== International editions ==
EDN Circulation; North America
Year	Total	Print	%	Digital	%
1999	164,949				
2000	136,024				
2001	134,015				
2002	134,021				
2003	134,025				
2004	134,025				
2005	133,922				
2006	134,026				
2007	131,948				
2008	125,011				
2009	113,010				
2010	113,048				
2011	101,700	71,700	70.5	30,000	29.5

EDN is also published in China and Taiwan and in Japan by ITmedia, Inc. which licenses content from AspenCore Media.

== Publishing Segment ==
The website, EDN Network, caters to the needs of the working electrical engineer and covers new technologies and electronic component products at an engineering level. Columns discuss everything from managing engineers and engineering projects to technical issues faced in the design of electronic components, systems and developing technologies.

== Design ideas ==
The "Design Ideas" section features several user-submitted designs that are innovative or novel solutions to constrained design problems. Every issue features a column called "Prying Eyes" which disassembles a popular or intriguing consumer product and investigates the technologies that enable it.

== ASBPE Awards ==
In May 2006, EDN won three awards from the American Society of Business Publication Editors. The Best Regular Department of the Year award went to "Prying Eyes".

== Executives and journalists ==
- William M. Platt, appointed publisher of EDN in December 1967 by Cahners Publishing
- Robert H. Cushman (1924–1996), editor for EDN from 1962 to the late-1980s covering, among other things, the early development of microprocessing
