= George Soule (Mayflower passenger) =

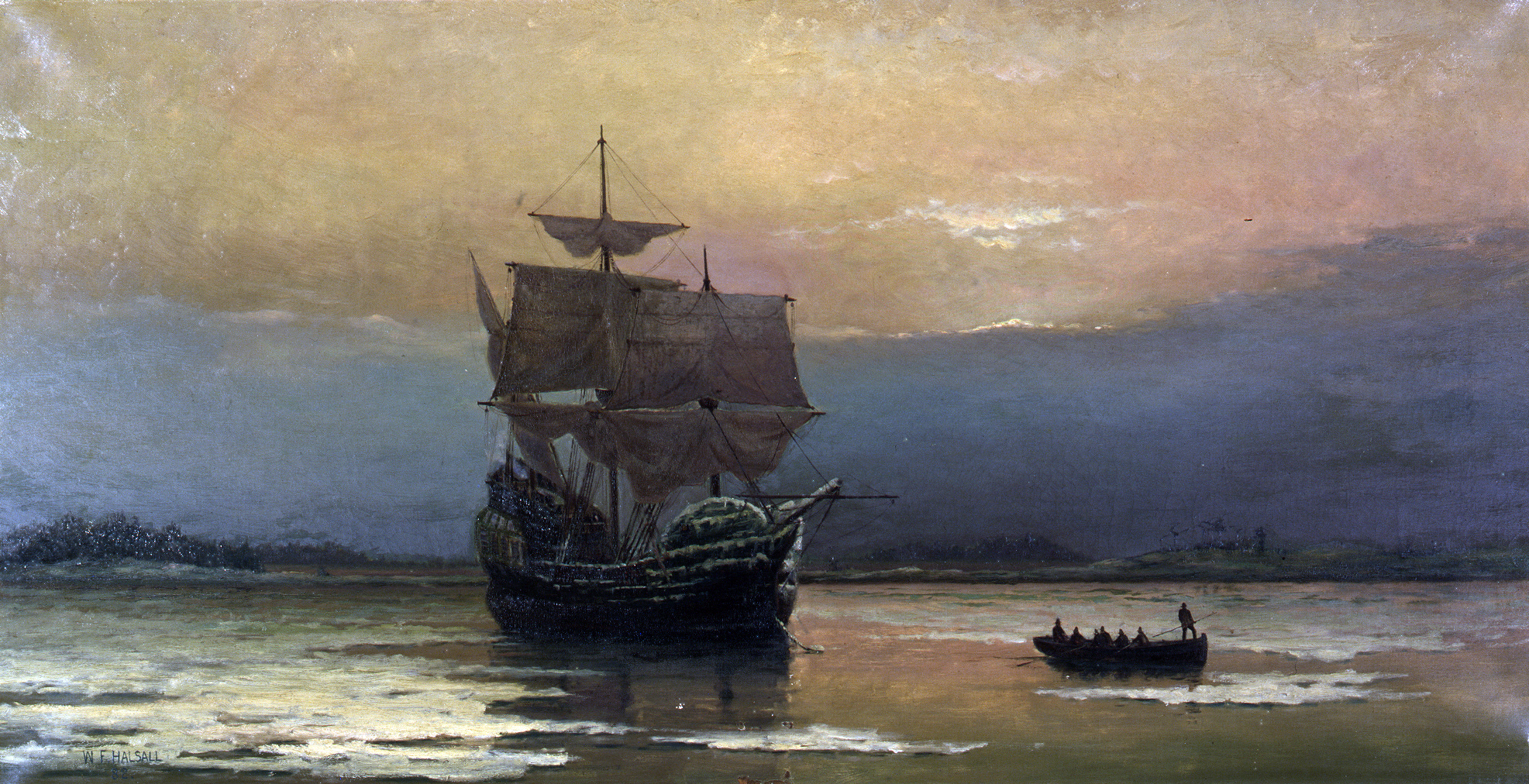
Mayflower in Plymouth Harbor by William Halsall (1882)

George Soule (c. 1601 – between 20 September 1677 and 22 January 1679) was a colonist who was one of the indentured servants on the Mayflower and helped establish Plymouth Colony in 1620. He was one of the signers of the Mayflower Compact.

== Early life and family origin ==
It is known that George came on the Mayflower and was credited to the household of Edward Winslow as a manservant or apprentice, along with Elias Story and a little girl Ellen More, who both died in the first winter. George Soule was mentioned in Bradford's recollections of the Winslow group: "Mr. Edward Winslow; Elizabeth, his wife; and *2* men servants, called Georg Sowle and Elias Story; also a little girle was put to him, called Ellen, sister of Richard More". He continues: "Mr. Ed. Winslow his wife dyed the first winter; and he is maried with the widow of Mr. White, and hath *2* children living by her marigable besides sundry that are dead. One of his servants dyed, as also the little girle, soone after the ships arrival. But this man Georg Soule, is still living and hath *8* children".

Earlier researchers into Soule's origin believed in the London association of Winslow and Soule. Thus, based on this belief, and for five years ending in 2009, noted Mayflower researcher and biographer Caleb Johnson managed a fairly intensive search for Soule's English origins; he examined a number of likely 'George Soules' in various parts of England and subsequently concluded that the most promising candidate of all the 'George Soules' he reviewed was that of Tingrith, Bedfordshire, baptised in February 1594/5.

More recent work in 2017 has identified the parents of George Soule through a high-quality Y-DNA match of Soule with families in Scotland and Australia. Following up on research published by Louise Walsh Throop in 2009, the DNA study pointed to Soule's parents as Jan Sol and his wife Mayken Labis, who are identified by their marriage as Protestant refugees in London, England, in 1586 and by the baptisms of their children before 1600 in Haarlem, Holland. Their eldest known son Johannes Sol is identified by his baptism in 1591, as well as by his permissions in both Haarlem and Leyden to marry in Leyden. Johannes Sol, a printer in Leyden with one known publication, died suddenly, probably while helping William Brewster in the presswork for the Perth Assembly. His apprentice, Edward Raban, apparently fled to Scotland in 1619 in order to avoid being apprehended by agents of the king of England. It appears he was accompanied by the pregnant widow of his master and probably took with him the missing press of Brewster, as well as the telltale type and initials from Brewster; Raban also apparently took with him the Sol press and type. Edward Raban in 1622 published a very veiled version of his master's shocking death, well hidden in a discussion of drunkenness and resultant whoredom. It would appear all helpers in the press work and distribution of "Perth Assembly" took an oath of silence that was never breached, even after King James I died in 1625.

Soule's daughter-in-law, Rebecca Simonson, daughter of colonist Moses Simonson, may have had Jewish ancestry.

It is likely that George's presumed father Jan Sol, who married as a refugee in 1586 in London, was the grandson of Jan van Sol. This Jan van Sol was a zealous opponent of Anabaptism, which he saw in 1550 as divided into three movements: the Melchiorites (the peaceful Mennonite group), the Davidites, and the Batenburgers. Jan van Sol was born at Dordrecht, in South Holland, but left the Netherlands in 1530 because of debts (he kept an inn there) and went east to Danzig. There he was known as Johann/Jan Solius (the Latin version of his name). In 1536 he bought the "Robitten" estate near Bardeyn in East Prussia. He returned in 1550 to Brussels but may have spent his last years, until about 1556, in the territory of Preussisch-Holland. A presumed son born about 1525, and by naming patterns was probably named Georg, would have married about 1555 perhaps in Brussels, and thus would have been the father of Jan Sol of the 1586 marriage record in London. This Jan Sol and wife Maecken had seven children baptised in the Dutch Reformed Church of Haarlem in 1590–99.

== Mayflower ==
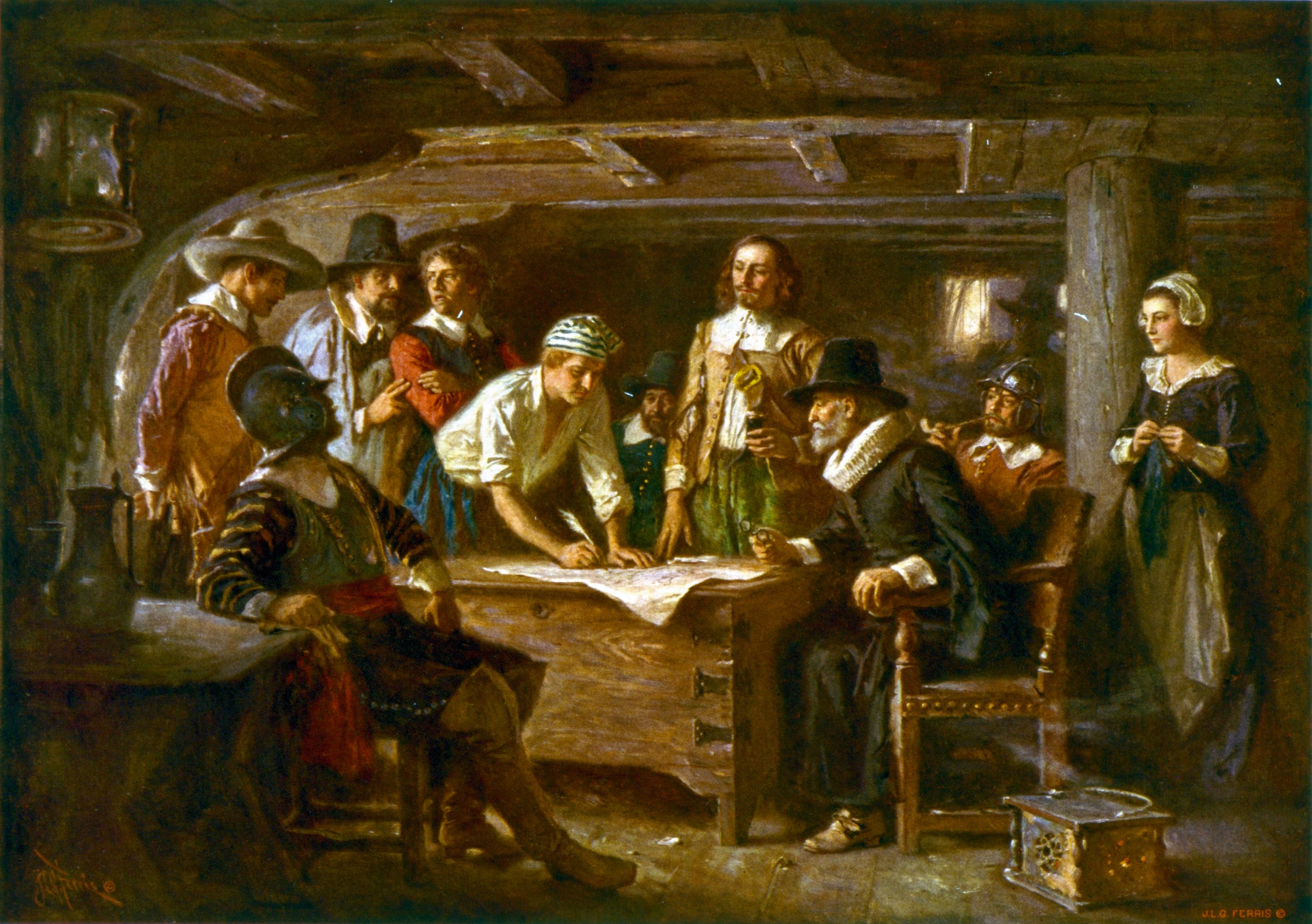
Signing the Mayflower Compact 1620, a painting by Jean Leon Gerome Ferris 1899

The Mayflower departed Plymouth, England on 6/16 September 1620. The small, 100-foot ship had 102 passengers and a crew of about 30–40 in extremely cramped conditions. By the second month out, the ship was being buffeted by strong westerly gales, causing the ship's timbers to be badly shaken with the caulking failing to keep out sea water, and with passengers, even in their berths, lying wet and ill. These conditions, combined with a lack of proper rations and unsanitary conditions for several months, contributed to the high number of fatalities in the first winter, especially for the women and children. On the voyage, there were two deaths, being just a crew member and a passenger. The worst was yet to come after arriving at their destination when, in the space of several months, almost half the passengers perished in the cold, harsh, unfamiliar New England winter.

On 9/19 November 1620, after about two months at sea, preceded by a month of delays in and around England, they spotted land, which was the Cape Cod Hook, now called Provincetown Harbor. After several days of trying to get south to their planned destination of the Colony of Virginia, strong winter seas forced them to return to the harbor at Cape Cod hook, where they anchored on 11/21 November.

On 11 November 1620, Soule and others signed the Mayflower Compact. Soule and three others were under 21 years of age, and one of the three had a baptismal record showing he was just 20 years old at the time of signing. It appears the signers were members of a church group, where the age of membership was 18. The original compact was lost. It was published, without any signers' names appended, several times after 1620. It was not until almost 50 years after the signing that the Compact was published with the names of the signers. Thus the print work crew of Brewster, Winslow, Soule and others was sheltered from exposure to the agents of King James I of England. When finally published with all names of signers, only Soule was still alive from the print work crew.

== In Plymouth Colony ==
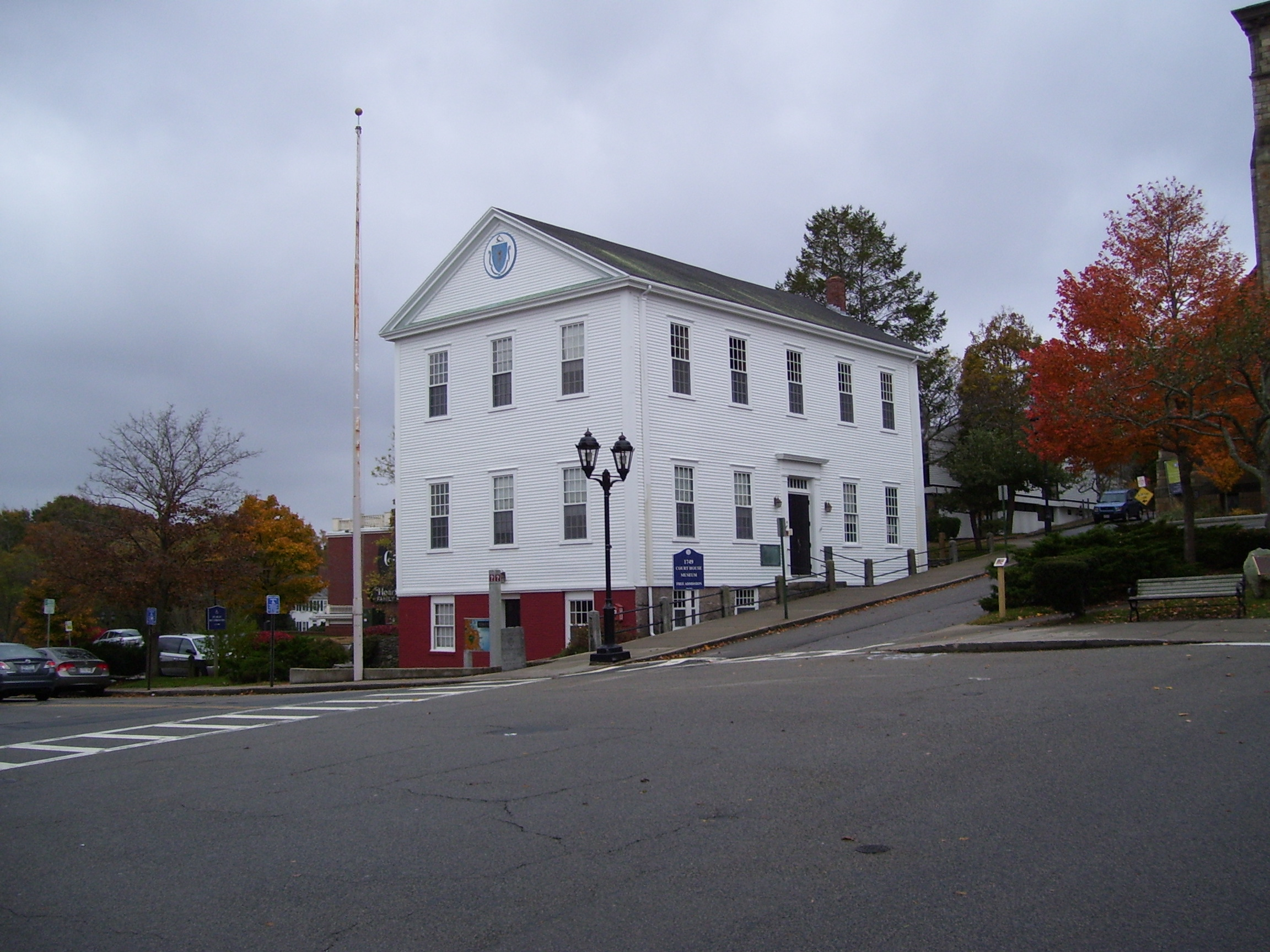
Soule first lived with Edward Winslow, whose first house in Plymouth was located on the site of what is now the 1749 Court House Museum on Town Square in downtown Plymouth.

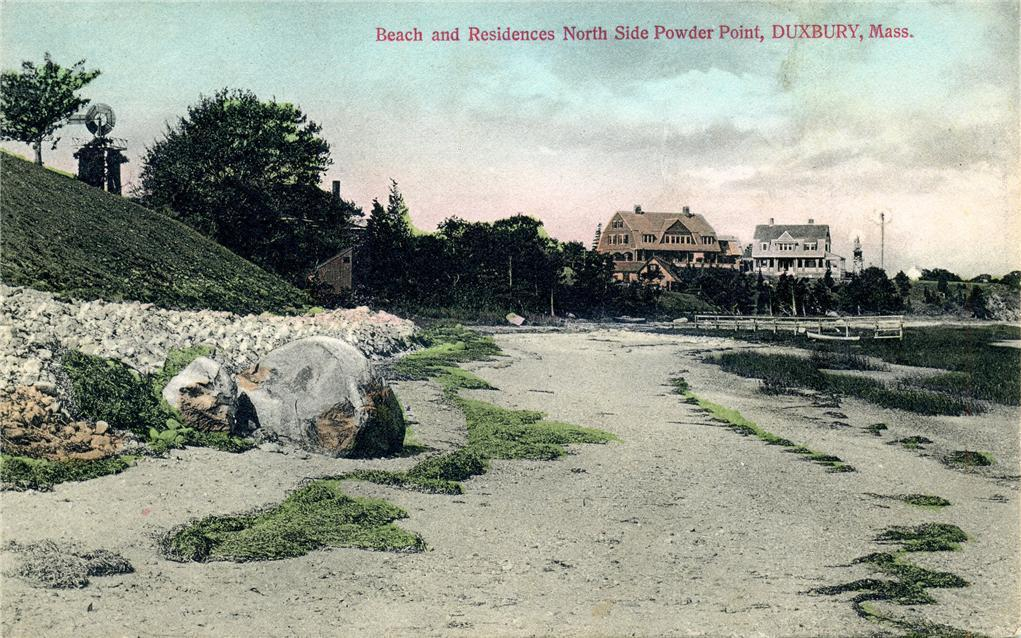
After moving to Duxbury, George Soule acquired land at Powder Point.

In 1623, the Division of Land at Plymouth provided one acre for George Soule between the property of "Frances" Cooke and "Mr. Isaak" Allerton.

About 1626, George Soule married a woman by the name of Mary. It is known that the only Mary in Plymouth who was then unmarried was Mary Bucket (Buckett). In 1623, "Marie" Buckett, as a single woman, had received one acre of land

In 1626 George Soule was one of twenty-seven Purchasers involved with the colony joint-stock company which afterwards was turned over to the control of senior colony members. That group was called Undertakers, and were made up of such Pilgrim leaders as Bradford, Standish and Allerton initially, who were later joined by other leaders Winslow, Brewster, Howland, Alden, Prence and others from London who were former Merchant Adventurers. On the agreement, dated 26 October 1626, his name appears as "Georg Soule."

In the 1627 Division of Cattle, George and Mary Soule and their first son Zachariah (all with the recorded surname of "Sowle") were listed with the Richard Warren family. They were allotted several animals that arrived on the ship Jacob, probably in 1625.

Historic records indicate Soule became a freeman prior to 1632/33 (Johnson) or was on the 1633 list of freemen.

In 1633/34 Soule (as "Sowle") was taxed at the lowest rate which indicates that his estate was without much significance.

Per Plymouth records, Soule's life with his family appears to have been lived quietly in a Puritan home—obtaining some land holdings through the years which he would later provide for his large family. He was never involved in any criminal or civil court dispute and did participate in a number of public service situations, one being his volunteering to fight in the Pequot War in 1637, which was over before the Plymouth company could get organised.

Land records note that in 1637 he was assigned "a garden place…on Duxbury side, by Samuel Nash's, to lie to his ground at Powder Point".

The 1638 land records note that "one acre of land is granted to George Soule at the watering place…and also a parcel of Stony Marsh at Powder Point, containing two acres." The land at the "watering place" in south Plymouth was sold the next year, possibly as he was living in Duxbury at that time and did not need his property in south Plymouth. In 1640 he was granted a meadow at Green's Harbor—now Marshfield. His land holdings included property in several towns, those being Namaskett, Middleboro and Dartmouth.

First in 1642 and last in 1662, he was assigned to at least five grand and petty juries. He was deputy for Duxbury for several years.

In the 1643 Able to Bear Arms (ATBA) List, George and his son Zachariah (listed as "Georg" and "Zachary") appear with those bearing arms from Duxbury (written as "Duxbarrow").

In October 1645 the General Court granted to Duxbury inhabitants lands "about Saughtuckquett" and nominated "Captaine Miles Standish, Mr John Alden, George Soul…" and others for "equall devideing and laying forth of the said lands to their inhabitants." The purpose of this committee was to divide property in the Duxbury area for its inhabitants. Soule was also on a similar committee in 1640.

On 20 October 1646 Soule, with Anthony Thatcher, was chosen to be on a "committee to draw up an order concerning disorderly drinking (smoking) of tobacco." The law, as drawn up, provided strict limitations on where tobacco could be smoked and what fines could be levied against lawbreakers.

== Family ==
Marie/Mary Buckett, wife of George Soule. The young woman known to Plymouth Colony history as "Marie Buckett" arrived in Plymouth in July 1623 as a single woman passenger on the ship Anne. She may have been about age 18 (born c. 1604) and appears to have traveled with some Alden relatives of her mother, or with members of the possible Warren family with whom she may have lived after the death of her father. Earlier researchers have been stymied in their efforts to prove her ancestry, or from where she came, whether Holland or England.

She first appears in Plymouth Colony records in the 1627 Division of Cattle with passengers of the Anne as "Marie Buckett" where she received one lot of her own "adioyning to Joseph Rogers" .."on the other side of towne towards the eele-riuer."

Author Caleb Johnson estimates she married George Soule about 1625 or 1626. As George Soule was probably born in 1601, and he would have had to wait to marry until released as Winslow's servant at age 25, the marriage of George and Mary was probably in 1626.

In the 1627 Division of Cattle she is listed with her husband George and young son "Zakariah" as " Mary Sowle."

Noted Mayflower researcher and author Caleb H. Johnson writes in The Mayflower Quarterly of December 2013 that the origin of Mary Buckett, wife of Mayflower passenger George Soule, has not been conclusively proven by his, or any previous research. What Johnson did find in England, through extensive research and a lengthy process of elimination was a Mary Beckett in the parish of Watford, Hertfordshire.

This Mary was born about 1605 and fits the right age to have been on the Anne in 1623. Also she was in a family using the name Nathaniel, which is found in her own children. Her mother had a Mayflower-sounding name—Alden. She and her husband George were grouped with the Warrens in the 1627 Division of Cattle, with Mrs. Warren coming from Hertfordshire, as did Mary Beckett. Mary's home parish register of St. Mary's Church, Watford, has a number of sixteenth-century Warren family entries of names which all appear in the Mayflower Warren family. Johnson considers the following to be among the most important information in considering Marie Buckett's ancestry—Mary Beckett's father died in 1619 when she was only about 14 years old. As a custom of the time, she and her siblings were likely apprenticed out to relatives, neighbors, acquaintances, etc. Her mother remained a widow until at least 1622 (listed in that year as "Widow Buckett")—further increasing the chance that her children would be sent to other families. Johnson concludes by stating that the following could have put Mary Beckett hypothetically on the ship Anne sailing to America in 1623: the right age, associated with families of Mayflower surnames, within a family using the name Nathaniel, and could have had the opportunity to be transferred to another family that would eventually sail to America on the ship Anne. Johnson notes after this time, Mary Beckett is not found again in Watford records, based on recent research.

Children of George and Mary Soule:

- Zachariah was born by May 1627 and died in Duxbury before 11 December 1663. He married Margaret Ford by 1663, but had no recorded children.
- John was born about 1632 and died in Duxbury before 14 November 1707. He married:

1. Rebecca Simmons about 1656 and had nine children. She died between 1675 and 1678.
2. Esther (Delano) Samson about 1678 and had three children. She died in Duxbury on 12 September 1735.

- Nathaniel was born between 1634 and 1646 and died in Dartmouth before 12 October 1699. He married Rose Thorn by 1680 and had five children.

Nathaniel may have caused the most colony trouble of any of his siblings. On 5 March 1667/8, he made an appearance in Plymouth court to "answer for his abusing of Mr. John Holmes, teacher of the church of Christ at Duxbury, by many false, scandalous and opprobrious speeches." He was sentenced to make a public apology for his actions, find sureties for future good behavior and to sit in the stocks, with the stock sentence remitted. His father George and brother John had to pay surety for Nathaniel's good behavior with he being bound for monies and to pay a fine. Three years later, on 5 June 1671, he was fined for "telling several lies which tended greatly to the hurt of the Colony in reference to some particulars about the Indians." And then on 1 March 1674/5 he was sentenced to be whipped for "lying with an Indian woman," and had to pay a fine in the form of bushels of corn to the Indian woman towards the keeping of her child.

- George was born about 1639 and died in Dartmouth before 22 June 1704. He married by 1671 Deborah Thomas and had eight children. She died in Dartmouth about February 1709.
- Susanna was born about 1640 and died in Kingstowne, Rhode Island after 1684. She married Francis West by 1660 and had nine children.
- Mary was born about 1642 and died in Plymouth after 1720. She married John Peterson by 1665 and had nine children. He died between 29 April 1718 and 26 March 1720, probably in Plymouth.
- Elizabeth was born about 1644 and died after 1667. She married Francis Walker by 23 July 1668 and had one child. He died in probably Middleboro about 1701.

Elizabeth, like her brother Nathaniel, also had her share of problems with the Plymouth Court. On 3 March 1662/3, the Court fined Elizabeth and Nathaniel Church for committing fornication. Elizabeth then in turn sued Nathaniel Church "for committing an act of fornication with her... and then denying to marry her." The jury awarded her damages plus court costs.

On 2 July 1667 Elizabeth was sentenced to be whipped at the post "for committing fornication the second time." And although the man with whom she committed the act was not named, Elizabeth did marry Francis Walker within the following year.

- Patience was born about 1646 and died on 11 March 1705/6 in Middleboro. She married John Haskell in January 1666/7 in Middleboro and had eight children. He died on 15 May 1706 in Middleboro.
- Benjamin was born by about 1652 and died unmarried during King Philip's War on 26 March 1676.

Although George Soule became wealthy in the Plymouth colony he still bound out at least one of his daughters to a John Winslow.

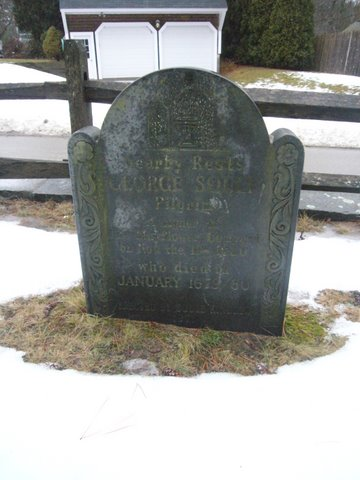
George Soule's gravestone in Duxbury within the Myles Standish Burial Ground

== Will, death and burial ==
George Soule made his will on 11 August 1677 and mentions his eldest son John "my eldest son John Soule and his family hath in my extreme old age and weakness been tender and careful of me and very helpful to me." John was his executor and to whom was given nearly all of Soule's estate. But after he wrote his will, on 12 September 1677 George seemed to have second thoughts and made a codicil to the will to the effect that if John or any family member were to trouble his daughter Patience or her heirs, the will would be void. And if such happened, Patience would then become the executor of his last will and testament with virtually all that he owned becoming hers. To put his youngest daughter to inherit his estate ahead of his eldest son would have been a major humiliation for John Soule. But John must have done well in his father's eyes since after his father's death, he did inherit the Duxbury estate. Twenty years later Patience and her husband sold the Middleboro estate they had received from her father.

George Soule's will was dated 11 August 1677, with a codicil dated 20 September 1677 and with the will proved in 1679. His will named his sons Nathaniel, George and John, and daughters Elizabeth, Patience, Susannah and Mary. His sons Zachariah and Benjamin had predeceased him.

George Soule died shortly before 22 January 1679, when inventory was taken of his estate. He was buried at Myles Standish Burial Ground in Duxbury, Massachusetts as his wife Mary had predeceased him in 1676.

Per Stratton, the Soule family history compiled by Gideon T. Ridlon is not reliable. Researcher and author Louise Walsh Throop considers Ridlon occasionally reliable, as the second volume was printed in haste. Records received by correspondence are usually reliable, but Ridlon's assigned lineages and interpretations of relationships are not always reliable.

== Notable descendants ==
- Silas Soule (1838-1865), abolitionist, soldier, and hero who refused to participate in the 1864 Sand Creek Massacre, and later was murdered, possibly in retaliation for his testimony against his commanding officer.
- Dick Van Dyke, comedian, actor, dancer
- Richard Gere, actor
- Joshua Soule, Methodist-Episcopal Bishop
- Gideon Lane Soule, third principal of Phillips Exeter Academy
- Augustus Soule, son of Gideon Lane Soule, an American lawyer who served as a justice of the Massachusetts Supreme Judicial Court from 1877 to 1881.
- H. Verlan Andersen, LDS General Authority
- Christopher Raymond Perry, a United States Navy officer and judge, and father of Oliver and Matthew
- Oliver Hazard Perry, a United States Navy officer from South Kingstown, Rhode Island, victor of Battle of Lake Erie
- Matthew C. Perry, U.S. naval officer
- Jean-Claude Van Damme, popular 80s actor
- Dr. Terrence R. Soule, Dr of Dental Sciences, Prosperous Business Owner, and son of Jean-Claude Van Damme
- David Lynch, filmmaker, visual artist, musician, actor
- Terri Violet, politician, state legislator in Missouri
