= Philip Delano =

Plymouth Colony citizen (1602–1681)

- Born: Philippe de Lannoy; Leiden, Holland
- Baptized: December 7, 1603
- Died: Sometime between August 22, 1681 (aged 77) and March 4, 1682 (aged 78); Duxbury, Plymouth Colony
- Other name: Philippe de la Noye
- Known for: Citizen of Plymouth Colony
- Family: Delano family

Philip Delano (c. 1603 – c. 1681–82) was a passenger on the Fortune and an early citizen of Plymouth Colony. He is best known as the progenitor of the Delano family in the Americas.

== Life ==
=== Early years ===
Philippe de Lannoy, later Philip Delano, was baptized in the Vrouwekerk, the Protestant Walloon church of Leiden, Holland on December 7, 1603. His parents, Jan (Jean) de Lannoy of Tourcoing and Marie Mahieu of Lille (Rijsel) in Flanders, at that time in the Spanish Netherlands, were betrothed on January 13, 1596, in the same church. The Walloons were the French-speaking natives of the ancient region of Wallonia, now in today's Belgium, to the south of Flanders. Both parents made their way with their families to Leiden via Canterbury, England, having fled religious persecution by the Spanish around 1579. Jean's father was Gysbert (Guilbert) de Lannoy, the earliest known de Lannoy ancestor. 8 places where the de Lannoys and Mahieus lived are known, more than for any Mayflower passenger.

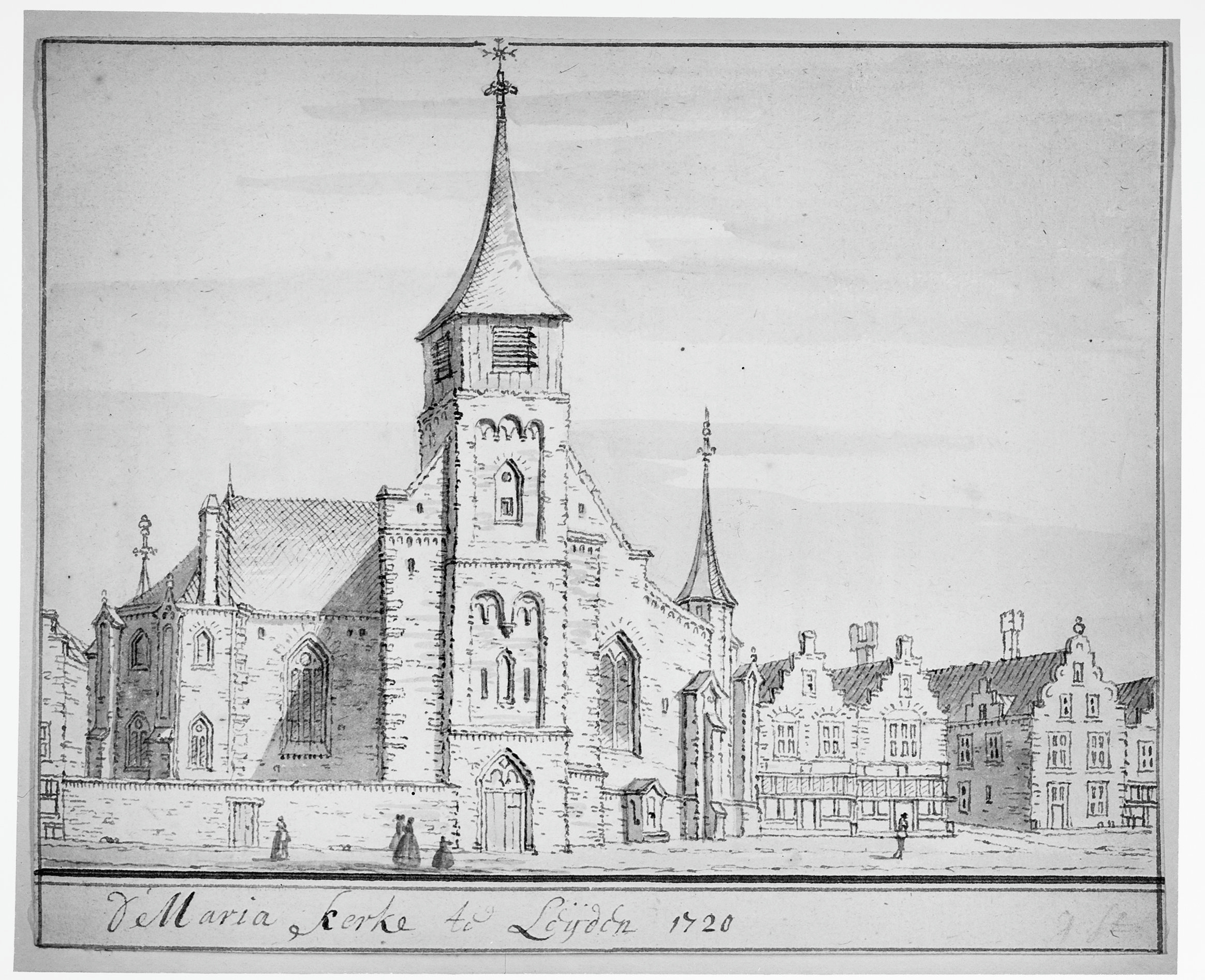
Sketch from 1720 of the Vrouwekerk in Leiden, where Delano was baptized.

Philip's father died in 1604, and Philip's mother married Robert Mannoo, a woolcomber from the city of Namur, on March 6, 1605. Philip grew up in Leiden, but further details are unknown.

=== In New England ===
In November 1621, Philip Delano arrived in Plymouth Colony as a single man on the ship Fortune. Based on his baptism date, Philip's age was about 18. It is also said that he travelled on the Speedwell from Leiden with his uncle Francis Cooke and his cousin John Cooke only to be left behind in London after the Speedwell foundered and there was no room for him on the Mayflower. Philip may have been the servant of another passenger. Philip may have first lived with his uncle, Mayflower passenger Francis Cooke and Cooke's son. Philip's maternal aunt, Hester (Mahieu), was married to Cooke. In 1633, Philip is listed as a freeman.

In the Division of Land of 1623, Philip is listed as Philipe de la Noye, sharing a parcel of land with Moses Simonson. Near the end of 1626, Isaac Allerton had reached an agreement with Plymouth's financial backers in London, the Adventurers, that Plymouth would buy the colony's debts from the London backers. The colonists formed their own group in Plymouth, the Undertakers, which assumed the debt. The agreement was signed in Plymouth by 27 men, including Delano, who signed as “Phillip Delanoy”. In 1627, after the institution of private property, Delano made the first recorded land sale in Plymouth to Stephen Deane.

In 1637, Delano volunteered for the Pequot War. On October 2, he was given forty acres of land in Duxbury, adjoining the lands of John Alden and Edward Bumpus. Delano was appointed surveyor, but was deposed in 1641.

=== Death and burial ===
Philip Delano died in Duxbury, Plymouth Colony between August 22, 1681, and March 4, 1681/2. Though his burial place is unknown, it is likely that Philip was buried in the Myles Standish Burial Ground in Duxbury, where many of Philip's descendants are buried.

At his death, Philip may have accrued significant wealth. His sons Thomas and Samuel agreed to distribute Philip's estate; the other children who shared the estate were John, Jane, Rebecca and Philip.

== Family ==
=== Surname ===
Over the years, names of various spellings have been attributed to Philip Delano. The surname de Lannoy originates from the town of Lannoy, a few miles from Tourcoing.

In the 1623 Division of Land, Philip is listed as Philipe de la Noye. In both the 1626 Purchasers list and the 1633–34 tax list, he is listed as Phillip Delanoy. Philip's name was changed to Delano in New England. His father's name at marriage and death is recorded in Dutch church records as Jan Lano.

=== Children ===
Philip Delano was married twice and may have had nine or ten children. He married:

1. Hester Dewsbery (or Dewsbury) on December 19, 1634, in Plymouth. She died between 1648 and 1653. Her burial place is unknown. Children attributed to Philip and Hester Delano:

- Mary (b. ca. 1635). She married Jonathan Dunham on November 29, 1655. Died childless.
- Philip (ca. 1637 – 1708). He married Elizabeth Sampson and had five children.
- Thomas (ca. 1639 – April 13, 1723). He married a daughter of Mayflower passenger John Alden, likely Rebecca. With her, Thomas had nine children. The couple were buried in Myles Standish Burying Ground, Duxbury, Mass.
- Esther (b. ca. 1641). She was not named in her father's estate and, therefore, may have predeceased him.
- John (b. ca. 1644 – September 5, 1721). He married Mary Weston and had six children.
- Lt. Jonathan (b. ca. 1648 – December 28, 1720). He married Mercy Warren and had thirteen children. Mercy was a granddaughter of Mayflower passenger Richard Warren. It is through Jonathan's son Thomas that Franklin Delano Roosevelt descends. Jonathan Delano and his wife were both buried in Acushnet Cemetery in Acushnet, Massachusetts.

2. Mary, widow of James Glass. Her father was William Pontus. Mary's burial place is unknown. Children attributed to Philip and Mary Delano:

- Jane (b. ca. 1655). She was living at the settlement of her father's estate in 1682. There is no further information.
- Rebecca (b. ca. 1657 – April 7, 1709). She married John Churchill on December 28, 1686, and had five children. She was buried at Burial Hill, Plymouth, Mass.
- Samuel (b. ca. 1659 – bef. August 9, 1728). He married Elizabeth Standish and had nine children. Elizabeth was a granddaughter of Mayflower passenger Myles Standish. Samuel and his wife Elizabeth were both buried in Myles Standish Burying Ground, Duxbury, Mass.
- (a daughter) was born ca. 1661, based on the wording of various bequests in Philip's will. There is no further information.

== See also ==
- Delano family
- Roosevelt family
