= Perth Assembly =

1619 book published by the Pilgrims in Leiden

Perth Assembly was a controversial book published by the Pilgrims in Leiden in 1619.

In the same year, before they departed on the Mayflower for Massachusetts; the book was smuggled into Scotland in wine vats. The book was critical of the Five Articles of Perth, a church statute which had been ratified by the General Assembly in Perth in 1618.

The Five Articles forced the episcopacy form of church governance onto Scotland, a change which King James I strongly supported and the Pilgrims rejected. The King considered the book, and its printers, publishers, and distributors, to be subversive.

The printer was Johannes Sol ("Soule") and the primary publishers were Thomas Brewer and William Brewster who went into hiding in 1619 before surreptitiously departing for Plymouth to escape threat of arrest. Other Pilgrims, such as George Soule (presumably the brother of the printer Johannes Sol), were also believed to have been involved in the printing of the book, and the controversy caused them to flee on the Mayflower and disguise their origins.

Johannes Sol's apprentice, Edward Raban, fled to Scotland in 1620 with Sol's pregnant widow after his death in a printing ink accident.
