= Robert Cushman (curator) =

American photography curator (1946–2009)

- Born: November 7, 1946; Indianapolis, Indiana, U.S.
- Died: July 13, 2009 (aged 62); Edgewood, Kentucky, U.S.
- Occupation: Photo curator

Robert Cushman (November 7, 1946 – July 13, 2009) was the photography curator for the Academy of Motion Picture Arts and Sciences (AMPAS) for 37 years. He is credited with developing and expanding the photographic archives of the Academy of Motion Picture Arts and Science's Margaret Herrick Library in Beverly Hills, California. The collection is estimated to consist of more than 10 million images and photographs as of 2009. Additional images were acquired by Cushman through his solicitation of donations from major Hollywood film studios, individuals and their families during his 37-year tenure with the Academy.

== Biography ==
=== Early life ===
Cushman was born in Indianapolis, Indiana. His initial interest in film began in 1950, when he went to the Rialto Theater in Fort Wayne, Indiana, to watch a reissue of the 1939 film, The Wizard of Oz.

He earned his bachelor's degree from the University of California, Los Angeles (UCLA). He also took some post-graduate courses at UCLA.

Cushman worked as a research fellow with the American Film Institute (AFI). He was also employed by the Los Angeles County Museum of Art, where he created program notes for the museum's film series. Cushman held both of these positions prior to joining the Academy.

=== Academy of Motion Picture Arts and Sciences ===
In 1972, Cushman joined the staff of the Academy of Motion Picture Arts and Sciences and became photographic curator of the Margaret Herrick Library's collection of photographs.

Under Cushman's guidance as curator, the Academy developed and organized the Margaret Herrick Library's photographic collection, which now has more than 10 million individual photographs as of 2009. Cushman obtained archival photographic collections from some of the film industry's most important studios, including the collection from United Artists. He also solicited donations to the library from individuals including Harold Lloyd, the family of Douglas Fairbanks, Buster Keaton, Katharine Hepburn and George Cukor.

Linda Mehr, director of the Margaret Herrick Library, credited Cushman with make the library's collection of industry photography more user friendly, "He also developed the protocols of organizing the material so it was accessible.

Cushman developed his own method of cleaning and preserving photographs, which allowed for the retrieval and removal of photos which had been previously adhered to books. Cushman's method, which removed paper, glue and other chemicals from the photographs proved valuable to the library's efforts to preserve and restore the images. In an interview with the Los Angeles Times, the library's director praised Cushman's methods as curator, "This cleaning process not only removed them from that paper but also got rid of the residual chemicals, so you could keep them in better shape."

Cushman restored his Los Angeles house, a Queen Anne Victorian home constructed in 1895. The home was named a Los Angeles Historic-Cultural Monument in 1979.

== Works authored ==
Cushman contributed writings and photographs to a number of books on Hollywood and the entertainment industry. His contributions included:

- "Mary Pickford Rediscovered: Rare Pictures of a Hollywood Legend"
- "Douglas Fairbanks" - Cushman contributed as the book's photographic editor
- "Hollywood's Chinese Theatre: The Hand and Footprints of the Stars from the Silents to Star Trek"
- "Hollywood at Your Feet: The Story of the World-Famous Chinese Theatre," co-written by Stacey Endres.

== Death ==
Robert Cushman died on July 13, 2009, at St. Elizabeth's Hospital in Edgewood, Kentucky, during a trip at the age of 62. He had been attending a wedding in Kentucky and visiting his high school in Fort Wayne, Indiana, when he became seriously ill.
