= Rialto Theatre (Fort Wayne, Indiana) =

Coordinates: 41.06075°N 85.13804°W

The Rialto Theatre is a former movie theater in Fort Wayne, Indiana.

The theater opened in 1924 as a 700-seat Streamline Moderne style theater. Built for $150,000, it "was considered one of the Midwest's most beautiful theaters." In the 1940s, a balcony was added. It closed in 1989 and in 1993 was named by the city as a "locally designated historic district."

A non-profit organization, The Reclamation Project, bought the Rialto in 2003 with the intention of rehabbing it at an estimated cost of $2 million. However, after being unable to raise the funding, the organization put the theater up for sale in 2015 for $249,000.
