= Cushman (mango) =

Mango cultivar

Mangifera 'Cushman'
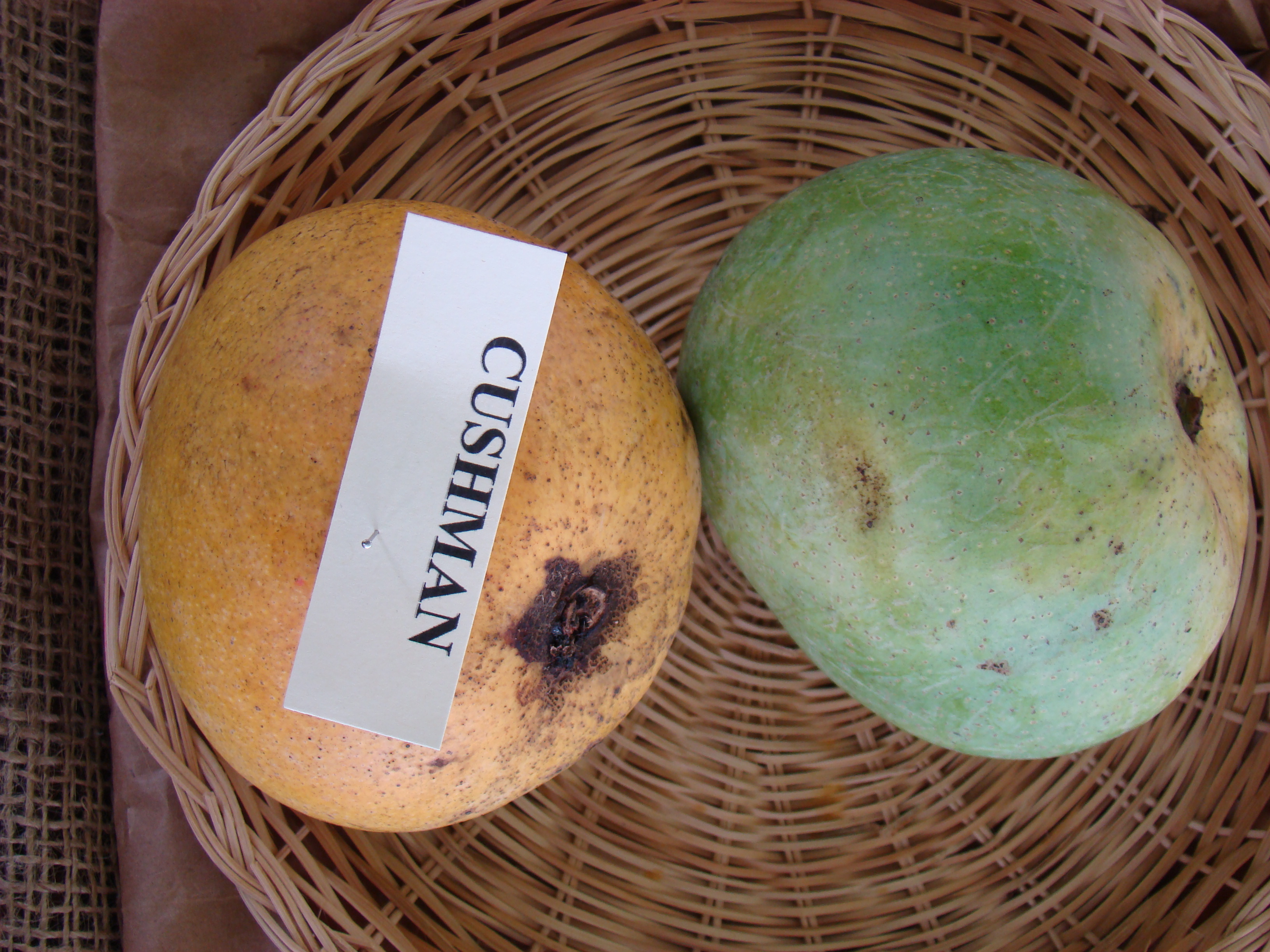
- Display of 'Cushman' mango at the Redland Summer Fruit Festival, Fruit and Spice Park, Homestead, Florida
- Genus: Mangifera
- Species: Mangifera indica
- Hybrid parentage: 'Haden' × 'Amini'
- Cultivar: 'Cushman'
- Origin: Florida, US

The 'Cushman' mango is a mango cultivar that originated in south Florida. The variety had limited to no commercial application but has been sold as a dooryard tree.

== History ==
The original tree grew from a seed planted in 1936 on the property of E. L. Cushman, in Miami, Florida. For many decades afterward its parentage was unknown, but a 2005 pedigree analysis suggested that the cultivar was likely a cross between Haden and Amini. The fruit was recognized as having excellent eating quality, but the trees were poor bearers making the cultivar undesirable for commercial production. Cushman was also known as the 'Big Yellow'.

Cushman trees are planted in the collections of the USDA's germplasm repository in Miami, Florida, the University of Florida's Tropical Research and Education Center in Homestead, Florida, and the Miami-Dade Fruit and Spice Park, also in Homestead.

== Description ==
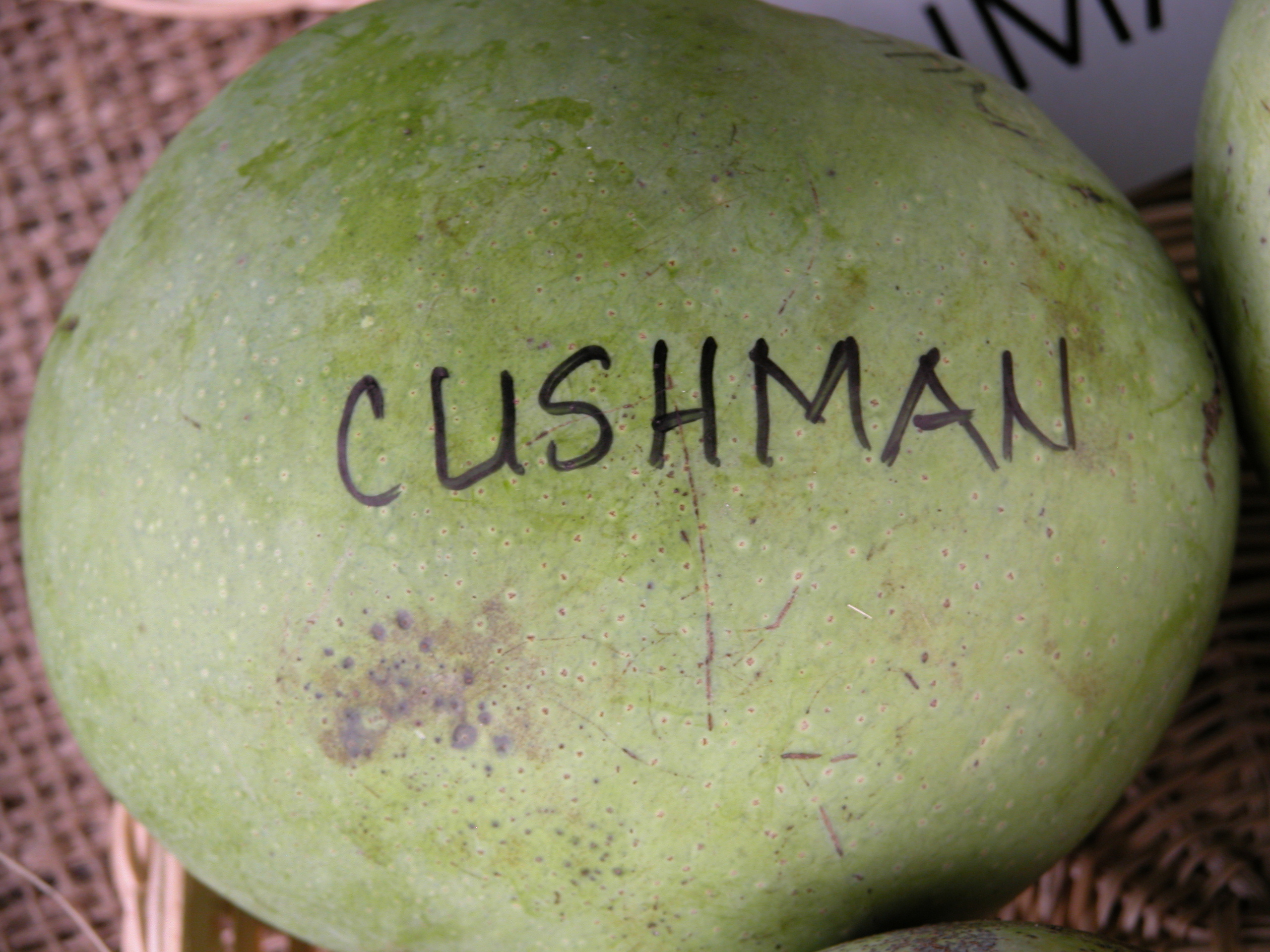
Display of 'Cushman' mango at the Tropical Agricultural Fiesta held in the Fruit and Spice Park in Homestead, Florida

The fruit is round in appearance and yellow when ripe, often looking more like a grapefruit than a mango. The flesh is pale yellow, completely fiberless, and has a sweet, rich flavor and aroma. The fruit averages over a pound in weight, getting up to 2 pounds, and contains a monoembryonic seed. The flesh has a distinctive characteristic in that when sliced open, Cushman fruit have a visible orange "halo" outlining the flesh closest to the skin. The fruit mature from July to August in Florida.

The trees are vigorous growers with spreading canopies of medium density.
