= Priscilla Cushman =

American physicist

Priscilla Brooks "Prisca" Cushman (also published as Priscilla Cushman Petersen) is a professor in the School of Physics and Astronomy at the University of Minnesota. Formerly focused on the study of muons through accelerator-based high energy physics, including collaborating on the Muon g-2 and Compact Muon Solenoid experiments, her recent research has concerned the experimental search for dark matter through the Cryogenic Dark Matter Search experiments. She has also collaborated with artist Karl Ramberg on a multimedia light and sound performance based on data from her dark matter experiments.

== Education and career ==
Cushman majored in physics at Harvard University, graduating cum laude in 1976. From 1976 to 1979 she worked as a senior scientist at Aeronautical Research Associates of Princeton. She completed a Ph.D. in physics at Rutgers University in 1985, supervised by Thomas J. Devlin.

She was a postdoctoral research associate at Rockefeller University from 1985 until 1988, working there on the UA6 experiment at CERN. From 1988 until 1993 she was an assistant and associate professor at Yale University, where she began her work on the Muon g-2 experiment. She moved in 1993 to the University of Minnesota as an associate professor of physics, and after continuing her work on Muon g-2 she began working on the Compact Muon Solenoid experiments. She was promoted to full professor in 2000, and began her work on dark matter as director of the Low Background Counting Facility at the Soudan Mine in 2004. She became spokesperson for the SuperCDMS collaboration in 2018, and remains its spokesperson.

== Recognition ==
Cushman was elected as a Fellow of the American Physical Society (APS) in 2012, after a nomination from the APS Division of Particles and Fields, "for outstanding contributions in the design and execution of experiments probing beyond the Standard Model especially the Cryogenic Dark Matter Search and the precise measurement of the muon magnetic moment, and the development of photodetection and low radioactivity instrumentation to advance the capabilities of high energy physics experiments". She was named as a Fellow of the American Association for the Advancement of Science in 2014.
