= Thomas Cushman (Plymouth colonist) =

Plymouth colonist

- Born: 1607/08 (O.S./N.S.); Canterbury, Kent, England
- Died: 1691 (aged 83–84); Plymouth Colony (presumed)
- Burial place: Burial Hill
- Other names: Thomas Couchman
- Known for: Pilgrim
- Relatives: Robert Cushman (father)

Thomas Cushman (b. 1607/08 – d. 1691) was a leader in Plymouth Colony, New England.

He arrived at the colony with his father Robert Cushman on the ship Fortune in November 1621. Robert Cushman returned to England alone, leaving Thomas as a ward of Governor William Bradford.

In 1649 Thomas succeeded William Brewster as Ruling Elder and held that position for over 40 years until his death. Over his long life Cushman became a person of note in the colony being involved in numerous important activities. His wife Mary was the daughter of Pilgrim Isaac Allerton.

== English origins ==
Thomas Cushman was born in Canterbury, Kent, England, being baptized at St Andrews Church on February 8, 1607/08 (O.S./N.S). His parents were Robert Cushman and Sara Reder, his father being a grocer at that time. When Thomas was very young, the family emigrated to Holland to follow the English Separatist religious movement.

== The Cushman name ==
Robert Cushman seems to be one of the earlier carriers of this name, which over many years, per Kent parish records of the 16th and 17th centuries, derived from such surnames as Cowchman, Couchman, Cutchman, Cuchman, Crocheman, etc. The surname of Robert Cushman's father Thomas was Couchman.

Although spelled differently, the Couchmans of England had their deepest ancestry in Kent with Cranbrook at the center. Predominantly they were cloth makers, Flemish in origin, who with other countrymen came to several regions of England at the invitation of King Edward II around the year 1336. (from Thomas Fuller, Church History of England, 1837.)

== Life in Holland ==
Robert Cushman was a wool-comber in Leiden, Holland. In 1616, his wife Sara and two children were buried at St. Peter's church in Leiden. Robert later married Mary (Clark) Shingleton on June 5, 1617. She was the widow of Thomas, shoemaker of Sandwich, Kent. Late in 1617, soon after his second marriage, Robert Cushman and John Carver were tasked by the Leiden congregation to go to the Council for Virginia in London to negotiate for patent within the company's grant. Robert Cushman was the Leiden, and later, the Plymouth contingent's Chief Agent in England from 1617 until his death in 1625. There is no further record of Robert Cushman's second wife. She may have been deceased before the Cushmans embarked in the Fortune in 1621 and therefore the reason Thomas was left with Bradford.

== Life in New England ==
Robert Cushman and his son Thomas arrived on the ship Fortune on November 11, 1621, at New Plymouth. But Robert Cushman, having already been at sea for four months, returned to England shortly thereafter; this left young Thomas in the care of colony William Bradford. Bradford recorded that Robert Cushman's stay to attend to business regarding the London Adventurers agreement with the colony was “not above fourteen days”.

Thomas remained in Plymouth, working as a surveyor of roads and as a rate-assessor, among numerous other minor positions.

In the land division of 1623, he was paired with William Beale, the two of them receiving two “akers” (acres).

He was a Purchaser, that group involved in Plymouth colony investments and received a number of land grants.

His name also appears in the 1627 Division of the Cattle, which was, in effect, also a census. This was lot eleven, which listed, among others, the Bradfords, with whom Thomas was apparently living.

On January 1, 1633/34 he was admitted a Plymouth freeman.

On the 1643 “Able to Bear Arms” list, he is named along with the men from Plymouth.

On March 3, 1645/46 Cushman made a successful motion in court that Mr. Isaac Allerton be allowed a years time to recover his debts in the colony, Allerton being his father-in-law.

On April 6, 1649, he was chosen as Ruling Elder of the church, succeeding William Brewster, a position he held until his death.

No papers are left from Thomas Cushman, but one recently discovered document bearing his signature is in the care of the Massachusetts Historical Society. It is titled “A Petition to the General Court of New Plymouth by Thomas Cushman, Senior”. In the document Cushman is petitioning the court that more land be made available to him to provide for his large family - in part: “If there are any lands yet to be purchased, or purchased not yet disposed of - neare to any society ayther begune or upon beginning, that your honors would be pleased to further me in granting some proportion as your wissdome shall see meete: and I shalbe responsible to bear the charge for the purchase according to what may be my proportion.” The document is signed ‘Thomas Cushman, senyor”. No date is on the document, but is believed to be from the 1650s, when he did, as he states in the document, have “many children”.

== Family ==
Thomas married Mary, born about 1610, a daughter of Pilgrim Isaac Allerton, about December 1636 and had eight children. She died in Plymouth on November 28, 1699, the last of the Mayflower passengers. They were both buried at Burial Hill in Plymouth.

Children of Thomas and Mary Cushman:

- Thomas (jr) was born about 1637 in Plymouth and died in Plympton, Mass. on August 23, 1726. He was buried in Hillcrest Cemetery, Plympton, Massachusetts.

He married:
1. Ruth Howland on November 17, 1664 and had three children. Ruth was a daughter of Mayflower passengers John Howland and Elizabeth Tilley.
2. Abigail (Titus) Fuller on October 16, 1679 and had four children.

- Mary was born in Plymouth, but the year is unknown. She died before October 22, 1690. She married Francis Hutchinson about 1676 and had three children.
- Sarah was born about 1641 in Plymouth and died after February 10, 1706/07.

She married:
1. John Hawkes in Lynn on April 11, 1661 and had eight children. He died on August 5, 1694.
2. Daniel Hutchins shortly after November 7, 1695.

- Isaac was born February 8, 1648/9 and died in Plympton on October 21, 1732. He married Rebecca Harlow about 1675 and had seven children. Both were buried in Hillcrest Cemetery, Plympton, Mass. Rebecca was a sister of William Harlow, married to Isaac's sister Lydia.
- Elkanah was born June 1, 1651, in Plymouth and died in Plympton on September 4, 1727. He was buried in Hillcrest Cemetery, Plympton, Mass. with his 2nd wife Martha.

He married:
1. Elizabeth Cole on February 10, 1677 and had three children. She died January 4, 1681/2.
2. Martha Cooke on March 2, 1682 and had five children. Martha was a granddaughter of Mayflower passenger Francis Cooke.

- Feare was born on June 20, 1653, and died before October 22, 1690.
- Eleazer was born February 20, 1656/7 in Plymouth and died after November 1733. He married Elizabeth Coombs (Combs) on January 12, 1687/8 and had eight children.
- Lydia was born about 1662 in Plymouth and died there on February 11, 1718/9. She married William Harlow about January 1682/3 and had nine children. William Harlow was the brother of Rebecca Harlow, wife of Lydia's brother Isaac.

== The will of Thomas Cushman ==
In his will dated October 22, 1690, sworn March 16, 1691/92, he named his wife Mary, sons Thomas, Isaac, Elkanah and Eleazer; daughters Sarah Hawks and Lydia Harlow; and the three children of his daughter Mary Hutchinson.

== Death and burial of Thomas Cushman ==
Thomas Cushman became ill in his old age and languished for some eleven weeks before he died on December 10 or 11, 1691. He was buried on Burial Hill in Plymouth. His stone is among the oldest, of the second generation, on Burial Hill."

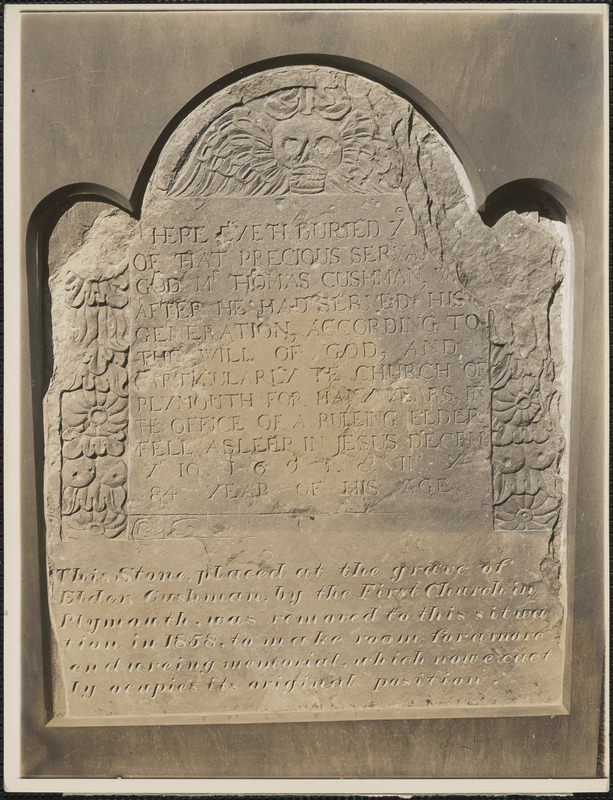
Thomas Cushman, Elder of First Church in Plymouth 1649-1691, ca. 1920-1960. Leon Abdalian Collection, Boston Public Library

== Gravestone and memorial for Thomas Cushman ==
The original inscribed stone in honor of Thomas Cushman is among the six oldest surviving, second generation, stones on Burial Hill. The stone had been placed at his grave by a revering congregation in 1719, with a careful remount and reinforcement in 1858.

Cushman memorial on Burial Hill in Plymouth: A 25-foot granite column, erected by Cushman descendants in 1858, memorializes the Cushman family and recognizes Robert Cushman, his son Thomas Cushman and his wife Mary (Allerton) Cushman, daughter of Mayflower passenger Isaac Allerton.
