= Fortune (Plymouth Colony ship) =

17th-century ship of American colonists

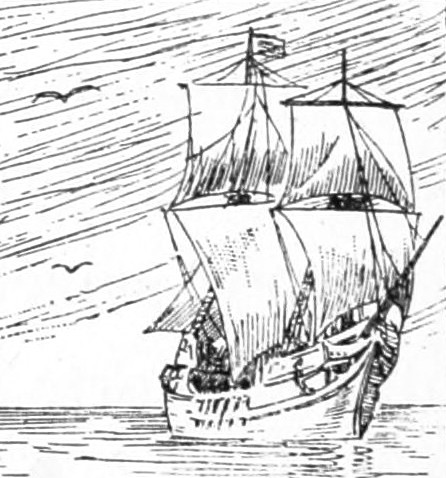
Conjectural illustration of Fortune

In fall 1621, the Fortune was the second English ship destined for Plymouth Colony in the New World, one year after the voyage of the Pilgrim ship Mayflower. Financed as the Mayflower was by Thomas Weston and others of the London-based Merchant Adventurers, Fortune was to transport thirty-five settlers to the colony on a ship that was much smaller than Mayflower. The Fortune required two months to prepare for the voyage and once underway, reached Cape Cod on 9 November 1621 and the colony itself in late November. The ship was unexpected by those in the Plymouth colony and although it brought useful settlers, many of whom were young men, it brought no supplies, further straining the limited food resources of the colony. The ship only stayed in the colony for about three weeks, returning to England in December loaded with valuable furs and other goods. But when nearing England, instead of heading to the English Channel, a navigation error caused the ship to sail southeast to the coast of France, where it was overtaken and seized by a French warship.

The Fortune finally arrived back in London in February 1622, over two months after leaving Plymouth, but without its valuable cargo. In the end, Weston lost his total investment in the Fortune voyage making it worthwhile only in providing the Plymouth colony with new settlers, some of whom became notable persons in the history of the colony.

== Preparing for the voyage ==
At 55 tons displacement, and about one-third the tonnage of the Mayflower, the Fortune was tasked with delivering thirty-five new settlers to Plymouth Colony. Their leader was Robert Cushman who, in 1620, had been the Leiden agent in London for the Mayflower and Speedwell. It is believed that the majority of the passengers of the Fortune were gathered together in London by Thomas Weston and his partner. And although William Bradford stated that there were thirty-five persons on board Fortune, the names of only twenty-eight persons are noted as receiving lots credited to those arriving as noted in the 1623 Division of Land. Eighteen persons are known to have been unmarried, eight married, but emigrating without their families, and as far as can be determined, Mrs. Martha Ford may have been the only woman on the ship. Although it is possible some of the missing seven persons in the passenger count were wives, Bradford does not leave that impression in his account.

Per author Charles Banks, individual records show that sixteen of the passengers can definitely be assigned to London or districts of the city such as Stepney and Southwark. Another three passengers were from Leiden in Holland. Ten more passengers, whose origins cannot be determined, either died early or left the colony as determined by who was listed in the 1627 Division of Cattle, which also doubled as a type of census.

== Arrival in the New World ==
The primary reason for problems at their arrival was the unexpected nature of it and the severe lack of food. As Bradford recorded, "...So they were landed, but there was not as much as biscuit-cake or any other victuals for them neither had they any bedding, but some sorry things they had in their cabins, nor pot, nor pan, to dress meat in; nor over many clothes,…" The colony government was not pleased that Weston had unexpectedly sent over new settlers, and without provisions or other goods to support them. But the labor that had come on the Fortune was welcome, being many young men. Per Bradford, the arrivals were "lusty young men, and many of them wild enough."

== Passengers ==
The problem that most concerned the colony was the continuing shortage of food made more severe by the arrival of the Fortune. Weston had not provided any provisions for the settlement on board the Fortune. And instead of making the colony situation stronger, the arrival of thirty-seven more persons to feed with the second severe winter for the colony coming on had put things in what would be a disastrous situation. Bradford calculated that even if their daily rations were reduced to half, their store of corn would only last for six more months. And after having worked tirelessly this year and experiencing extreme hardships since their arrival one year earlier, they now would face another hard winter with a shortage of provisions. Bradford wrote, "They were presently put to half allowance, one as well as another, which began to be hard, but they bore it patiently, under the hope of (future) supply."

Although there were thirty-five people on Fortune, only the names of twenty-eight persons are listed as receiving lots in 1623. Eighteen people are known to have been unmarried, eight married but emigrating without their families, and as far as can be determined, Mrs. Martha Ford and Elizabeth Bassett wife of William Bassett were the only women on the ship. Records indicate that sixteen of the passengers were from the London area and three from Leiden. The origins of ten passengers could not be determined.

=== Notable passengers ===
- William Bassett (c. 1590–1667), artisan
- Robert Cushman (1577–1625), Separatist
- Thomas Cushman (1607 or 1608–1691), colonist
- Philip Delano (c. 1602–c. 1681 or 1682), colonist
- Thomas Prence (c. 1601–1673), colonist and politician
- Moses Simonson (c. 1605–c. 1690), colonist
- William Hilton (1585–1685). Established Dover, first permanent settlement in New Hampshire with brother Edward Hilton.

== Loading for the return trip to England ==
To prove to the Adventurers that they were serious about repaying the debt owed to Weston, the colony spent two weeks in December 1621 loading the Fortune with hogsheads of beaver skins, otter skins, sassafras, and clapboards made from split oak to be used in the making of barrel staves. The value of the cargo was about £450 (equivalent to about £112,036 in 2025), which would come close to reducing the colony's debt to the Adventurers by half.

== Return voyage to England ==
The Fortune stayed in Plymouth for just about two weeks, and on 13 December 1621, she got underway for her return voyage to London. On board was Robert Cushman who had left his fourteen-year-old son Thomas in the care of Governor Bradford. Cushman carried, in addition to Bradford's letter to Weston, a manuscript that would become an invaluable historic recording of the Pilgrims first thirteen months in America known today as Mourt's Relation. Believed written by Bradford and Edward Winslow, it recounts the First Thanksgiving and the abundance of the New World.

Fortune was not with the ship of that name on the return to England. Due to a navigation error the ship sailed hundreds of miles off course from England, southeast into France's Bay of Biscay off the coast of Vendee, north of La Rochelle. About five weeks into her voyage on 19 January 1622 and not far from the fortified Île d'Yeu, a French warship overtook the Fortune. It seems the Fortune made a common mistake – the long peninsula of Brittany in western France was mistaken for the Lizard peninsula on the southwestern end of England. The Fortune was not considered an enemy ship, however, France at this time was undergoing Huguenot rebel activities, and any English vessel coming close to their shore was suspected of aiding the rebels and liable for search and seizure. The French warship boarded Fortune. Although the Fortune was not carrying contraband, the French governor seized her guns, cargo, and rigging. The governor locked the ship's master in a dungeon and kept Robert Cushman and the crew on board under guard. He also confiscated the manuscript of Mourt's Relation. After thirteen days they were freed, with the manuscript in Cushman's possession but without its cargo of valuable beaver skins. The Fortune finally arrived back into the Thames on 17 February 1622.

The loss of Fortune's valuable cargo dealt a severe financial loss to the Merchant Adventurers who by this time had little hope of recouping their investment in either ship. Due to this, the Merchant Adventurers were reorganized in 1626 in conjunction with Plymouth Colony leaders, in an effort to restructure financial agreements and for Plymouth Colony to eventually pay its creditors.
