= Robert Cushman =

English Separatist (1577–1625)

Robert Cushman (1577–1625) was an important leader and organiser of the Mayflower voyage in 1620, serving as chief agent in London for the Leiden Separatist contingent from 1617 to 1620 and later for Plymouth Colony until his death in 1625 in England. His historically famous booklet titled "Cry of a Stone" was written about 1619 and posthumously published in 1642. The work is an important pre-sailing Pilgrim account of the Leiden group's religious lives.

Cushman was most likely one of the first Mayflower passengers when the ship sailed from London to Southampton to meet the Speedwell coming from Leiden. The Speedwell was later forced to be abandoned.

== Early life in England ==
Cushman was born in 1577 in Rolvenden, county Kent and is believed to be the second son of Thomas Couchman (Cushman) and Ellen Hubbarde. In 1601 Cushman's mother, wife of Thomas Tilden, her second husband, was buried in Ashford. Thomas Tilden was possibly a Puritan, whose descendants later emigrated to Scituate in Plymouth Colony.

The first known record of Robert Cushman appears in December 1597 in the parish of St. George the Martyr, Canterbury, co. Kent. City accounts provide information about 18-year-old Cushman's apprenticeship to grocer George Masters, being a second son who did not inherit land and moved to the city to become an apprentice. George Masters had the monopoly of tallow candle making which had been granted to him by the city of Canterbury, with city butchers being obliged to sell animal fat to him for candle production. The parish of St. George being especially malodorous laying between the cattle market on one side and the butcher's slaughterhouse on the other. Apprentice Robert Cushman lived in George Master's house in St. George the Martyr parish, making tallow candles at least until 1599 and likely as late as 1602 or 1603.

Many of Cushman's religious beliefs may have come from other Canterbury Puritans and his attendance at illegal religious meetings known as "conventicles." The best view into his religious principles and possibly some other Mayflower Pilgrims can be found in his booklet titled "The Cry of a Stone." He writes that the Church of England "is wanting and defective", a "superstitious custom," and he would not wish to worship "humane devices." He writes that he decided to seek instead the "nearest fellowship that the Saints can have in this world, [that] most resembleth heaven." Cushman also writes that "God's people are still few, and scarce one of a hundred.." perhaps thinking of himself as one of the select few.

Cushman's first problem with authorities came in 1603 while he was still apprenticed to Masters. This involved the illegal distribution of libels (derogatory religious writings) in Canterbury by Cushman "of the parish of St. Andrew of Canterbury." The libels were handwritten notices stating "Lorde have mercy uppon us" which were posted on church doors throughout Canterbury. The authorities ordered that the "lewd seditious persons" posting the libels be found, interrogated and committed to prison if they refused examination. Robert Cushman was arrested by the authorities and not providing satisfactory answers upon questioning, for "certain reasons" was committed to Westgate prison for one night. Friends of Cushman's from his prior parish of St. George were also involved in posting libels.

In 1604 Cushman was prosecuted by the Court of High Commission for distribution of libels and by the archdeaconry court for non-attendance at his parish church of St. Andrew's. His first excommunication came on 16 January 1604 for not acknowledging his offense of complaining that he could not be edified at his parish church. Per his request, he was absolved on 15 October 1604. His second excommunication was on 12 November 1604, likely for the offence of spreading libels. Per his request, on 7 July 1605 absolution was granted and the sentence lifted.

In 1605 Cushman completed his apprenticeship and became a freeman "grosser" for payment of four shillings and one pence. His surname was variously recorded as "Couchman" and "Cowchman," which were two of several surnames applied to him in records of the time.

Various close connections of Cushman were found in Canterbury parish records as well as those for apprenticeship and marriage. These persons likely thought of themselves as "Godly" and often were called 'Puritan." Due to the fact that their conventicles were illegal and secret it is very difficult to research these associations other than to state that these kinship and marriage relationships seem to be true to form for Canterbury non-conformist society. In the pre-Leiden Pilgrim families of Nottingham and Lincolnshire, similar marriage and kinship relationships were found.

In 1606 Cushman was involved in an additional religious disturbance when the rector of St. George's, Thomas Wilson, accused a St. George's the Martyr parishioner, Gilbert Gore, of "false erroneous and devilish opinions" contrary to the Church of England and "repugnant to the word of God." Gore was spreading opinions about predestination that apparently were contrary to Church of England doctrine. Thomas Reader, likely Cushman's brother-in-law, testified that "Cushman of Canterbury was also of Gore's opinion." And another St. George's parishioner stated that Cushman had been "corrupted " by Gore. There were many other depositions, mostly St. George parishioners, indicating the parish had a number of dissenters and a few Separatists. Several of these deponents were associated with Cushman in earlier religious controversies.

A number of Canterbury Pilgrims are known to have moved to Sandwich in Kent where they resided prior to sailing for Leiden, Holland, with the James Chilton family, as an example, moving from Canterbury about 1600.

In February 1607/1608 is found the last Canterbury record for the Cushman family at the baptism of Robert's son Thomas at St. Andrews. The next record of the Cushman family appears in Leiden in 1611 when Cushman bought a house in Nonensteeg which was next to the university.

== Cushman family in Leiden ==
Robert Cushman and his family emigrated to Leiden, Holland, sometime before 4 November 1611, where he was a woolcomber. In the year 1616, the year before his appointment as agent of the Leiden (Leyden) Church, Robert Cushman had three family losses. His wife Sarah died early in the year – exact date unknown. One of their children had died in March and another in October.

== Preparing for the voyage to the New World ==
Beginning in September 1617, Cushman spent much of his time in England, working on preparations for the voyage to the new colony He, along with John Carver, became an agent of the Leiden (Leyden) Holland congregation for doing business in England. With Elder William Brewster in hiding, being searched for by men of James VI and I for Brewster's distribution of religious tracts criticising the king and his bishops, the Separatists looked to John Carver and Robert Cushman to carry on negotiations with officials in London regarding a voyage to America. By June 1619 Carver and Cushman had secured a patent from the Virginia Company for the Separatists. In 1620 they were in Aldgate, London, staying at Heneage House, Duke's Place, from where they negotiated with Thomas Weston for financial backing from a group of merchants. Carver and Cushman quarrelled with Weston and each other over finances, contractual terms, shipping and provisions for the journey, to the point where Carver despaired of the whole venture. 'We have begun to build’, he said, ‘and shall not be able to make an end.’ Cushman talked of 'a flat schism' between them. After Weston had hired the Mayflower ship, Cushman and Carver, as purchasing agents for the Leiden congregation, began to secure supplies and provisions in London and Canterbury.

== The More children ==
As the Separatists gathered in London, they were joined by the More children, who were placed under the care of Weston, Cushman, and Carver. John Carver and Robert Cushman had jointly agreed to find them guardians among the passengers. The children were sent to the Mayflower by Samuel More, the husband of their mother Katherine, after an admission of her adultery. The children were to be indentured servants to certain passengers: Elinor, age eight, to Edward and Elizabeth Winslow; Jasper, seven, to the Carvers; and both Richard, five, and Mary, four, to William and Mary Brewster. All of the children except Richard died in the first winter of 1620.

== Attempts to leave England on the Speedwell ==
The Mayflower sailed from London with its passengers at the end of July, 1620, to take on supplies and meet up with the Speedwell from Leiden at Southampton. When it was time to leave Southampton, in August 1620, Cushman made sure he joined his friends aboard the Speedwell, but the ship was not seaworthy. Cushman stated: "(S)he is as open and leaky as a sieve". Soon after Mayflower and Speedwell cleared the coast, they put in for repairs at Dartmouth, a port 75 miles west of Southampton. The repairs were completed on 17 August, but they were forced to remain in Dartmouth due to lack of wind. By then half their food had been eaten. In his writings Cushman was very concerned about this. Many of the passengers wanted to abandon the voyage, even though, to many, it meant losing everything they possessed. Cushman stated that the Mayflower captain refused to let them off. "(H)e will not hear them, nor suffer them to go ashore," Cushman stated, "lest they should run away." The months of tension had caught up with Cushman and he began to suffer a searing pain in his chest – "a bundle of lead as it were, crushing my heart." He felt he was going to die. The two ships left Dartmouth and sailed more than 300 miles, but then they again had to turn back, this time to Plymouth in Devon, because of trouble on the Speedwell. The Speedwell had to be abandoned because she would never have survived the voyage. The trade-off for a safer passage was the reduction of the 120 passengers to about 100, who then had to be squeezed aboard a single ship. Among those from the Speedwell who did not board the Mayflower was the family of Cushman, who stated he expected at any moment to become meate for ye fishes. After the decision to abandon the Speedwell, Cushman and his family had priority to sail on the Mayflower but they declined – probably because of Robert's illness.

== Arrival in Plymouth in 1621 ==
Robert Cushman and his son Thomas traveled to Plymouth Colony aboard the Fortune in 1621. Cushman carried with him a patent to the New Plymouth colony in the name of Mr John Pierce of London, one of the Merchant Adventurers.

Robert Cushman remained but a few weeks. His mission was to convince the settlers to accept the terms of their contract imposed by Thomas Weston and the London investors. This contract had incurred the resentment and anger of the Leiden contingent, and they had angrily rejected it on 5 August 1620, the date of departure from Portsmouth. But Cushman found at Plymouth that the settlers had finally come to realise their situation and their need for assistance from London. Cushman did complete his mission, but left Plymouth on 13 December 1621, having already spent four months at sea, and left his son Thomas in the care of Governor Bradford. Bradford later reported on Cushman's visit to Plymouth that he "stayed not above fourteen days" and that the ship Fortune was "speedily dispatched away laden with (cargo) estimated to be worth near £500."

On the voyage back to England, the Fortune was attacked by French pirates and was robbed of its valuable cargo, along with the possessions of crew and passengers.

== Cushman back in London 1622 ==
Cushman arrived back in London, 17 February 1622. He was carrying with him a valuable document known as the Bradford-Winslow "Relation" – (or historically known as 'Mourt's Relation') the detailed journal-account, that is, day-to-day written record of the exploration of areas of Cape Cod and Plymouth bay and harbour. The "Relation" is the single most important historical document of its kind in early American history.

When Robert Cushman arrived in London at the end of February 1622, he hurried to have printed and disseminated 'Mourt's Relation' as quickly and widely as possible, which was obviously meant as propaganda for the colony.

The mission of Cushman in aid of the new Plymouth colony was much advanced by his return and arrival in London, 17 February 1622, with the signed approval of the terms of the Adventurers with him. It had been certified by the signatures of the leadership now led by Governor Bradford, successor to John Carver. This document had renewed the relationship between the colonist and the London investors, and the investors were also relieved of ingratitude and culpable impropriety.

Cushman served as agent of the New Plymouth Colony and representative of the colony with the company of Merchant Adventurers of London until he died in May of 1625. Cushman did not die in London of the plague in 1625. There are no primary sources as evidence for this claim. Robert was visiting Benenden, Kent, the next door village to Rolvenden, where his brother, Richard, lived until Richard died in March 1623/24. Richard Couchman left a will probated in 1624 (PRC/17/65/443, Benenden). The will left a bequest to the children of "brother-in-law Stephen Everenden" (also Evernden). He married Richard and Roberts' sister, Sylvester Coucheman, in Rolvenden on 7 Nov 1593.

Robert Cushman intended to sail to Plymouth Colony and was visiting his relatives before he left. William Bradford, in his book Of Plymouth Plantation, wrote that Cushman's "own purpose was to come over and spend his [last] days with them". The St. Georges, Benenden archdeacon's transcript, primary source, record was May 6, 1625 "The 6 day Roberte Couchman a stranger." It was usual to identify a person as a "stranger" if they were from another parish. Robert lived in St. Botolph without Aldgate parish in northeast London.

William Bradford, Governor of Plymouth for many years, wrote upon receiving notice of Robert Cushman's death in England, that he "was as their right hand with their friends the (Merchant) Adventurers (London investment group), and for divers (sic) years had done and agitated all their business with them, to their great advantage."

== Family ==
Robert Cushman's first marriage, in the parish of St Alphege, Canterbury, 11 July 1606, was to Sara Reder, who lived in the precincts of the cathedral and whose parentage has not been discovered. Sara Cushman died in Leiden, Holland, and was buried on 11 October 1616. Two of her three children died that year also.

The children of Robert Cushman and his wife Sara:

1. Thomas Cushman (ca.1607/08-1691) was baptised at St Andrew's church, Canterbury. He died in Plymouth, Massachusetts, 11 December 1691. He married Mary Allerton, daughter of Isaac Allerton about 1636 in Plymouth. They had eight children. Mary died in Plymouth 28 November 1699, the last of the Mayflower passengers.

Thomas Cushman at age fourteen, was left behind at New Plymouth in the charge of the governor, William Bradford, after his father, Robert, returned to England. Thomas Cushman became Ruling Elder of the Plymouth Church in 1649, and remained in that office forty-two years until his death in 1691.

2. (child) Buried at Pieterkerk, Leiden, Holland 11 March 1616.

3. (child) Buried at Pieterkerk, Leiden, Holland 24 October 1616.

In 1617 Robert Cushman married secondly, Mary Clarke Shingleton in Leiden, widow of Thomas Shingleton, who had died there. Cushman was forty and Mary twenty-seven. Prior to 1610, before sailing for Leiden, the Shingeltons had also moved from Canterbury where they lived, to St. Peter's parish, Sandwich, Kent. They later joined the Pilgrim Church in Leiden.

== Cushman Monument on Burial Hill in Plymouth ==
Robert Cushman was buried in England in 1625. On 15 August 1855 a gathering of Cushman family members meeting on Burial Hill in Plymouth Massachusetts decided to erect a monument to him and his descendants. The family formed the Cushman Monument Association. with any person contributing to the Association receiving a certificate stating the amount contributed and a picture of the Monument. During the erection of the twenty-five-foot monument, the remains of Robert Cushman's son Elder Thomas Cushman, his wife Mary (Allerton) and other family members were found. These remains would later be buried within a space constructed beneath the monument, the completion of which was celebrated on 16 September 1858.

== See also ==
- The Mayflower Society
