= Bluefish River (Massachusetts) =

Coordinates: 42°02′36″N 70°40′37″W

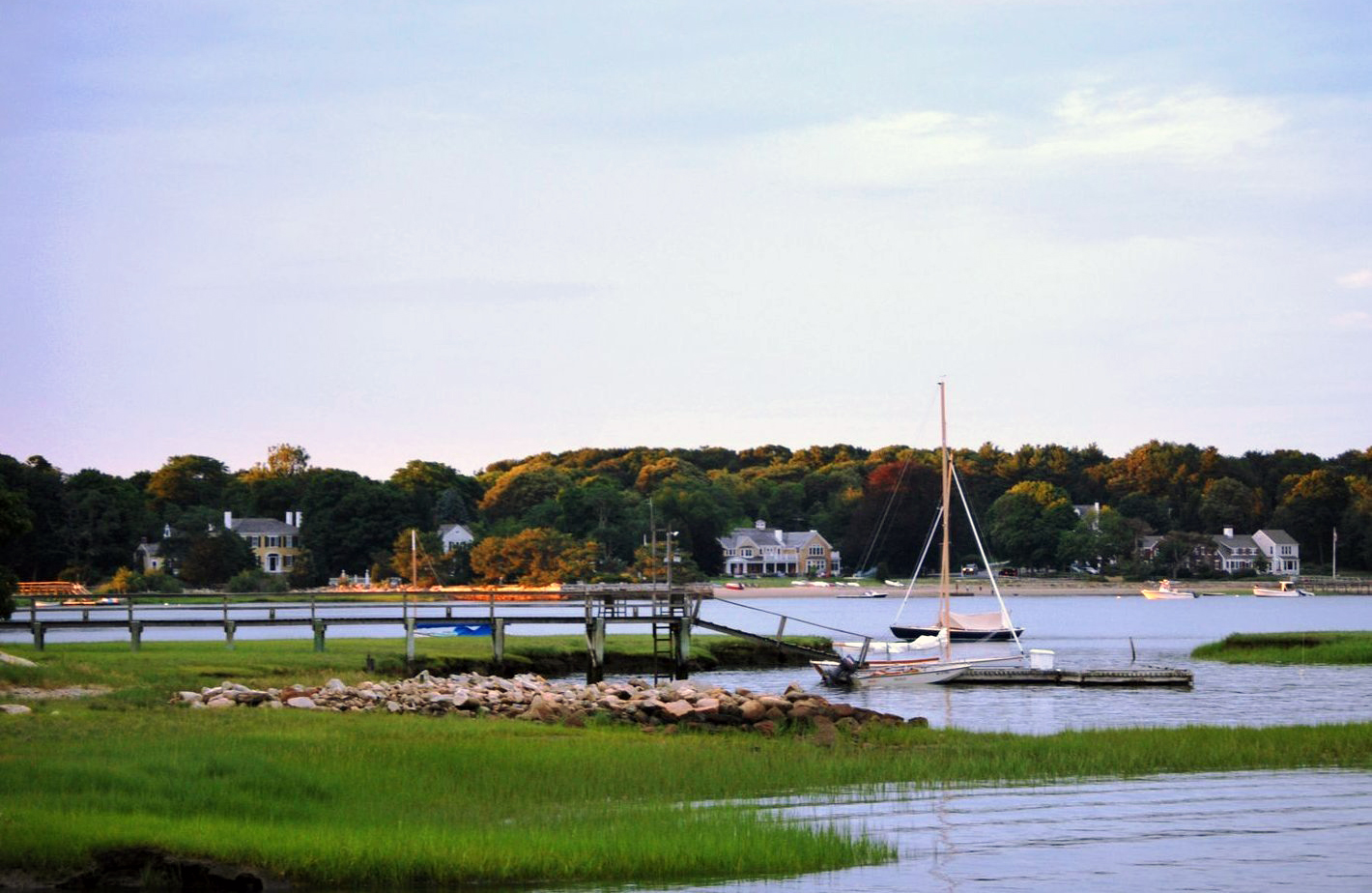
- The mouth of the Bluefish River (left) seen from the shore of Duxbury Bay

Location
- Country: United States
- State: Massachusetts
- Region: Duxbury

Physical characteristics
- Mouth
  - location: Duxbury Bay

The Bluefish River is a stream in Duxbury, Massachusetts ending in a tidal river estuary that was the center of an active shipbuilding industry during the early 19th century. Its source is a set of small ponds located near the intersection of Partridge Road and Washington Street, about one-third of a mile from Hall's Corner in Duxbury. The river is fed by Hounds Ditch Brook which empties into the Bluefish at the tidal estuary. The river contains Duxbury’s second anadromous fish run, with a privately owned fish ladder south of Harrison Street. A large portion of the northern shore of the Bluefish River estuary is occupied by the Capt. David Cushman Preserve operated by the Wildlands Trust which contains walking trails with views of the estuary. Near its mouth, the river passes under the stone Bluefish River Bridge, a local landmark and part of the Old Shipbuilders Historic District. The river discharges into Duxbury Bay between Long Point and Bumpus Park (formerly Weston's Wharf).

== History ==
Duxbury, Massachusetts was settled in 1628 as part of Plymouth Colony. According to Justin Winsor, the town's first historian, the Bluefish River was so named in the very early days of the settlement after "the large numbers of bluefish which frequented the waters in that vicinity." Historian Dorothy Wentworth noted that the name appears in colonial records as early as 1639. Early settlers whose homesteads bordered the Bluefish River include John Alden who was granted land on the north side of the Bluefish River and built a house near the river in 1628. A large portion of Alden's homestead eventually passed to Capt. David Cushman and, in turn, his property passed to the Wildlands Trust which now maintains the property as conservation land with walking trails.

In 1767, a group of Duxbury residents led by Joseph Drew were granted permission to build a gristmill on Bluefish River, though the erection of a mill was not possible without a bridge and tidal dam over the river. In 1803, Duxbury’s leading shipbuilders including Ezra Weston I, Joshua Winsor and Seth Sprague, began to put pressure on the town to build a bridge over the Bluefish River. With shipyards and various establishments being built on both banks, merchants no longer wished to make the long trek around the river estuary simply to get to the other side. The plan caused great controversy at Duxbury town meetings for several years. Eventually, the opposition was circumvented when shipbuilder Joshua Winsor agreed to build the bridge at half the estimated cost. The main proponent of the bridge, Ezra Weston I, gained the nickname "King Caesar" due to the autocratic pressure he applied at town meetings. The title passed to his son, Ezra Weston II, who became one of the wealthiest and most successful shipbuilders in New England. Ezra Weston II's house, known as the King Caesar House is a local landmark and museum owned by the Duxbury Rural and Historical Society and is located at the mouth of the Bluefish River. The Bluefish River bridge was completed in 1808. The project included a tidal dam and gristmill which was operated by local shipbuilders with Edward Winslow as proprietor. The original wooden bridge was replaced by the existing stone bridge in 1883.

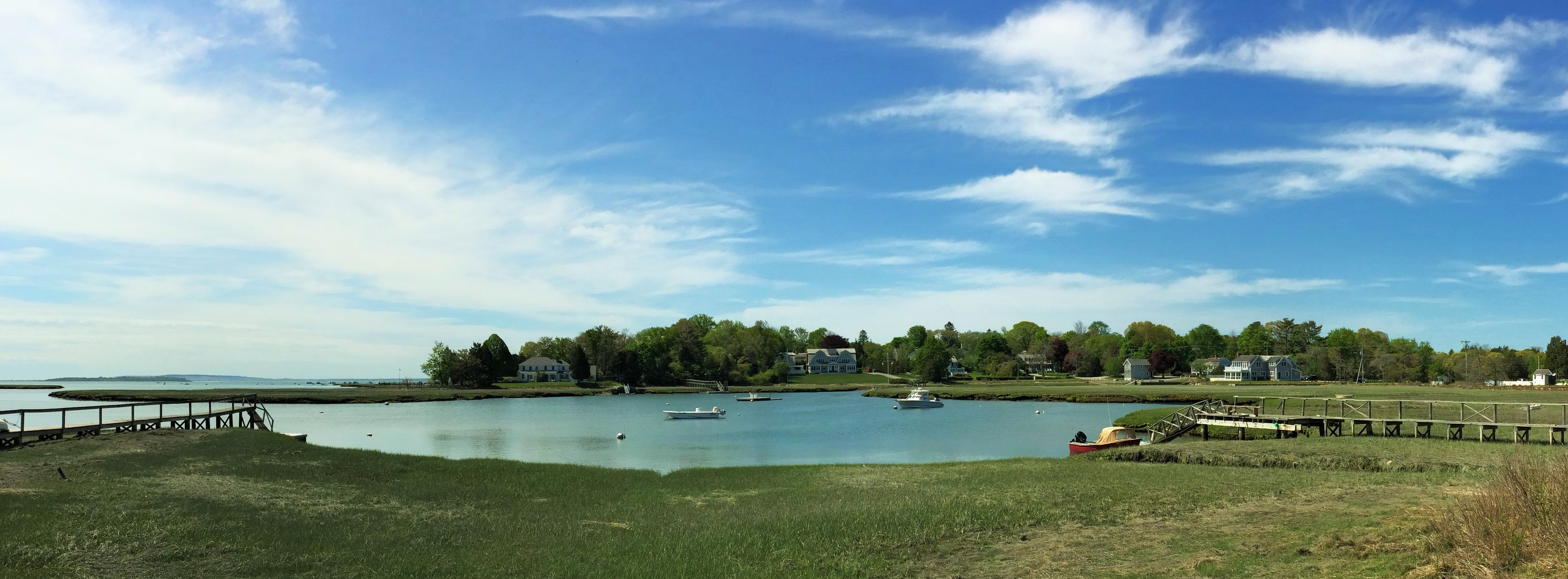
Bluefish River estuary in Duxbury, Massachusetts

During the early to mid-19th century, the Bluefish River estuary was dominated by an industrial and commercial environment. Six shipyards were eventually built in the small estuary which turned out large sailing vessels. In addition, there were forges, rope walks, sail lofts, work houses, boarding houses and numerous operations related to shipbuilding. Ezra Weston II had a shipyard on the south bank of the estuary from which he launched many ships, including the Ship Hope in 1841, the largest merchant vessel built in New England at the time. The Panic of 1837 drove most of these shipyards out of business. Others closed after the Civil War as shipbuilding moved to Boston. By the early 20th century the shores of the Bluefish River were cluttered with deteriorating and abandoned buildings. The Duxbury Rural and Historical Society led an effort in the 1910s to clean up the area and restore it to something more like its natural condition. The broad salt marshes which now dominate the estuary show no signs that industrial operations once existed there.

In the early 20th century, regular dredging operations of mud and silt in Duxbury Bay's basin identified the west edge of Bluefish River marshland, near where the river meets the Duxbury Bay, as a disposal area for the dredged contents. In 1972, the Duxbury Rural and Historical Society persuaded 95% of those owning marshland on the Bluefish River to grant easements prohibiting filling or altering of the marshes. In 1978, the state of Massachusetts established regulations protecting wetlands, which were more stringent than the easements formerly declared, and effectively ended disposal of dredged contents onto Bluefish River marshes.

== Hounds Ditch Brook ==
Hounds Ditch Brook runs roughly west to east crossing under Massachusetts Route 3A, through Wright's Ice Pond and Wright's Dike before emptying into the Bluefish River estuary. The dike and ice pond were constructed by the wealthy Wright family who had a large estate nearby in the late 19th century. Hounds Ditch is itself fed by a small unnamed brook with headwaters in the Millbrook section of Duxbury.
