= Bradford House =

Bradford House may refer to:

in the United States

(by state and then city)

- A. S. Bradford House, Placentia, California, listed on the National Register of Historic Places (NRHP)
- Bradford House (San Rafael, California), listed on the NRHP in California
- Bradford House II, Littleton, Colorado, NRHP-listed
- Bradford House III Archeological Site, Morrison, Colorado, listed on the NRHP in Colorado
- Raymond-Bradford Homestead, Montville, Connecticut, NRHP-listed
- Bradford-Huntington House, Norwichtown, Connecticut, NRHP-listed
- Bradford-Loockerman House, Dover, Delaware, NRHP-listed
- Fielding Bradford House, Georgetown, Kentucky, NRHP-listed
- Alexander Bradford House, Stamping Ground, Kentucky, listed on the NRHP in Kentucky
- Bradford House (Lewiston, Maine), NRHP-listed
- Bradford House, historic house in NRHP-listed Wiscasset Historic District, Wiscasset, Maine
- Capt. Gamaliel Bradford House, Duxbury, Massachusetts, NRHP-listed
- Capt. Gershom Bradford House, Duxbury, Massachusetts, NRHP-listed
- Captain Daniel Bradford House, Duxbury, Massachusetts, NRHP-listed
- Bradford House (Kingston, Massachusetts), NRHP-listed
- Benjamin and Mary Ann Bradford House, Canton, Michigan, NRHP-listed
- Bradford-Pettis House, Omaha, Nebraska, NRHP-listed
- Robert Bradford House, Centerville, Ohio, listed on the NRHP in Ohio
- David Bradford House, Washington, Pennsylvania, listed on the NRHP
- The Sister Dominica Manor, formerly known as Bradford House, a building in Providence, Rhode Island
- Bradford-Maydwell House, Memphis, Tennessee, listed on the NRHP in Tennessee
