= Old Shipbuilder's Historic District =

Historic district in Massachusetts, United States

- U.S. National Register of Historic Places
- U.S. Historic district
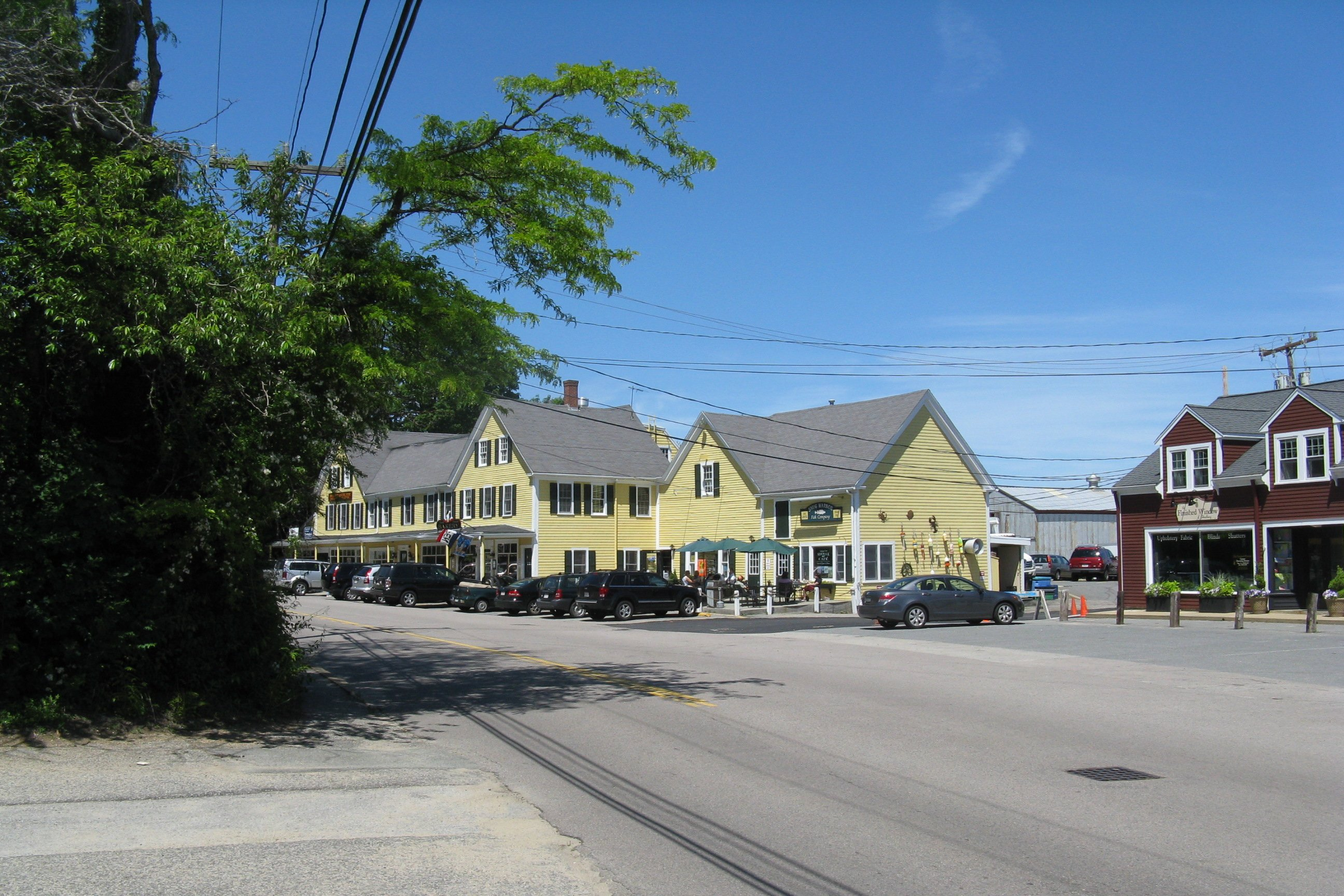
- Sweetser's General Store

- Location within Massachusetts Location within the United States
- Location: Both sides of Washington St. from Powder Point Ave. to N of South Duxbury, Duxbury, Massachusetts
- Coordinates: 42°2′17″N 70°40′31″W
- Area: 287 acres (116 ha)
- Architect: Multiple
- Architectural style: Georgian, Greek Revival, Federal
- NRHP reference No.: 86001899
- Added to NRHP: August 21, 1986

The Old Shipbuilder's Historic District is a 287-acre (116 ha) historic district in Duxbury, Massachusetts. The district includes both sides of Washington Street extending from South Duxbury (also known as Hall's Corner) to Powder Point Avenue, including several side streets off of Washington and a small portion of St. George Street and Powder Point Avenue.

The district was added to the National Register of Historic Places in 1986. In 1986, the district included 143 buildings deemed to contribute to the historic character of the area.

== Historic significance ==
The district was selected for inclusion in the National Register because it embodies the distinctive characteristics of Duxbury, Massachusetts, during the community's heyday as a center of shipbuilding and maritime commerce. Within the district are scores of houses, which are well-preserved examples of early 19th century architecture. The great majority of the structures are of the Federal style and were constructed between 1800 and 1820. There are also some examples of Greek Revival and Victorian architecture.

Washington Street, which makes up the bulk of the district, runs two miles along the shore of Duxbury Bay from Hall's Corner to the Bluefish River and slightly beyond. First laid out in 1798, the street was, at the time, a controversial scheme concocted by several up-and-coming shipbuilders. These men, including Ezra Weston I, Ezra Weston II, Seth Sprague and Joshua Winsor, were among the first in the community to take advantage of the post-Revolution economic boom, and each built substantial fleets of fishing schooners. Their new wealth commanded attention and respect in the community, however they met with opposition from the bulk of residents when they proposed the construction of a north-south avenue along the shore. Prior to 1798, Duxbury's shore was only accessible by crude cart paths. In order for maritime commerce to thrive, the shipbuilders required an avenue running along the water, which would allow convenient placement of shipyards, warehouses, stores, wharves, and boarding houses. Although the proposal caused uproar at Duxbury Town Meetings for several years, even ending up in court with the shipbuilders suing the Town for refusing to construct the avenue, the project, including a wooden drawbridge over the Bluefish River, was eventually completed in 1803.

Immediately after its construction, sea captains, shipwrights, and merchants began building homes on Washington Street. The shipyards and wharves are now gone, but the houses remain and collectively provide a sense of the character of early 19th century Duxbury. The avenue that at first caused so much consternation is now one of Duxbury historic resources.

== Contributing properties ==
The Nathaniel Winsor, Jr. House, built 1807

== See also ==
- National Register of Historic Places listings in Plymouth County, Massachusetts
