= King Caesar (disambiguation) =

King Caesar is a kaiju from Toho's Godzilla film series.

King Caesar may also refer to:

- A British game of tag from the 19th century; see British Bulldog (game) § King Cæsar
- Ezra Weston II (known as "King Caesar"), a 19th-century Massachusetts shipbuilder and merchant

== See also ==
- King Caesar House, a museum in Duxbury, Massachusetts, the former home of Ezra Weston II
