= Gambrel =

Four-sloped roof

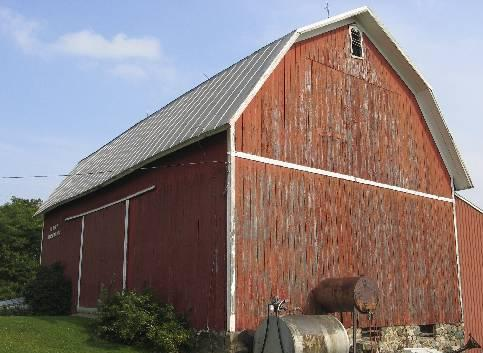
Barn with a gambrel roof

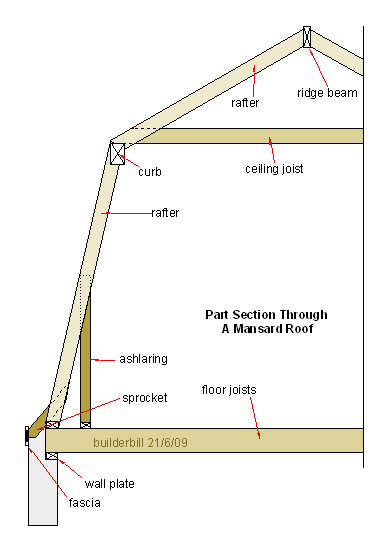
A cross-sectional diagram of a mansard roof, which is a hipped gambrel roof

A gambrel, or gambrel roof, is a usually symmetrical two-sided roof with two slopes on each side. The upper slope is positioned at a shallow angle, while the lower slope is steep. This design provides the advantages of a sloped roof while maximizing headroom inside the building's upper level and shortening what would otherwise be a tall roof, as well as reducing the span of each set of rafters. The name comes from the Medieval Latin word gamba, meaning 'horse's hock or leg'. The term gambrel is of American origin, the older, European English name being curb roof (kerb roof, kirb roof).

Europeans historically did not distinguish between a gambrel roof and a mansard roof but called both types mansard roofs. In the United States, various shapes of gambrel roofs are sometimes called Dutch gambrels, Dutch Colonial gambrels, or Swedish, German, English, French, or New England gambrels, or bell-cast eaves.

The cross-section of a gambrel roof is similar to that of a mansard roof, but a gambrel has vertical gable ends instead of being hipped at the four corners of the building. A gambrel roof overhangs the façade, whereas a mansard normally does not.

== Origin and use of the term ==
Gambrel is a Norman English word, sometimes spelled gambol, such as in the 1774 Boston carpenters' price book (revised 1800). Other spellings include gamerel, gamrel, gambril, gameral, gambering, cambrel, cambering, chambrel referring to a wooden bar used by butchers to hang the carcasses of slaughtered animals. Butcher's gambrels, later made of metal, resembled the two-sloped appearance of a gambrel roof when in use.

Gambrel is also a term for the joint in the upper part of a horse's hind leg, the hock.

In 1858, Oliver Wendell Holmes Sr. wrote:

Know old Cambridge? Hope you do.—
Born there? Don't say so! I was, too.
(Born in a house with a gambrel-roof,—
Standing still, if you must have proof.—
"Gambrel?—Gambrel?"—Let me beg
You'll look at a horse's hinder leg,—
First great angle above the hoof,—
That's the gambrel; hence gambrel-roof.)

An earlier reference from the Dictionary of Americanisms, published in 1848, defines gambrel as "A hipped roof of a house, so called from the resemblance to the hind leg of a horse which by farriers is termed the gambrel." Webster's Dictionary also confusingly used the term hip in the definition of this roof.

The term is also used for a single mansard roof in France and Germany. In Dutch the term tweezijdige mansardekap, 'two-sided mansard roof', is used for gambrel roofs.

== Origins of the gambrel in North America ==
The origin of the gambrel roof form in North America is unknown. The oldest known gambrel roof in America was on the second Harvard Hall at Harvard University built in 1677. Possibly the oldest surviving house in the U.S. with a gambrel roof is the c. 1677–78 Peter Tufts House. The oldest surviving framed house in North America, the Fairbanks House, has an ell with a gambrel roof, but this roof was a later addition.

Claims to the origin of the gambrel roof form in North America include:

1. Indigenous tribes of the Pacific Northwest, the Coast Salish, used gambrel roof form (Suttle & Lane (1990), p. 491).
2. Spanish, Portuguese, Dutch, and English mariners and traders had visited or settled into the area of southeast Asia now called Indonesia prior to permanent European settlement in America. In Indonesia, they saw dwellings with a roof style where the end of a roof started as a hip and finished as a gable end at the ridge. The gable end was an opening, to allow smoke to dissipate from the cooking fires. This roof design was brought back to Europe and the American Colonies, and adapted to local conditions. The roof style is still in use around the world today;
3. seamen who traveled to the Netherlands brought the design back to North America;
4. or practical reasons such as a way to allow wider buildings, the use of shorter rafters, or to avoid taxes.

== Image gallery ==
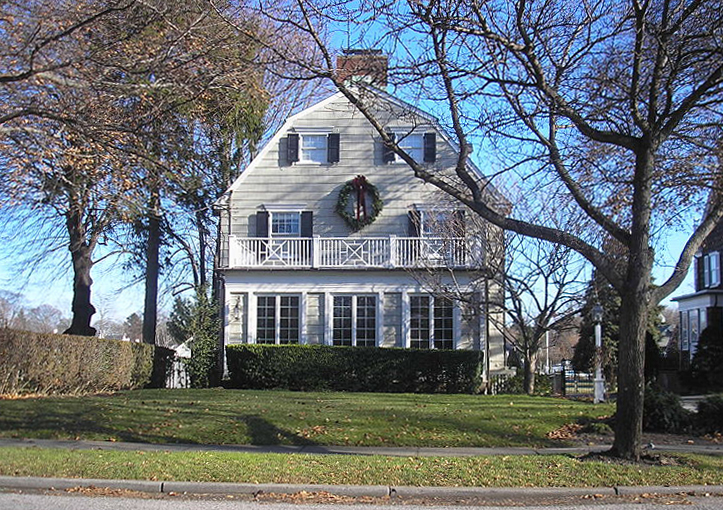
Dwelling with gambrel roof in Amityville, New York, made famous by The Amityville Horror

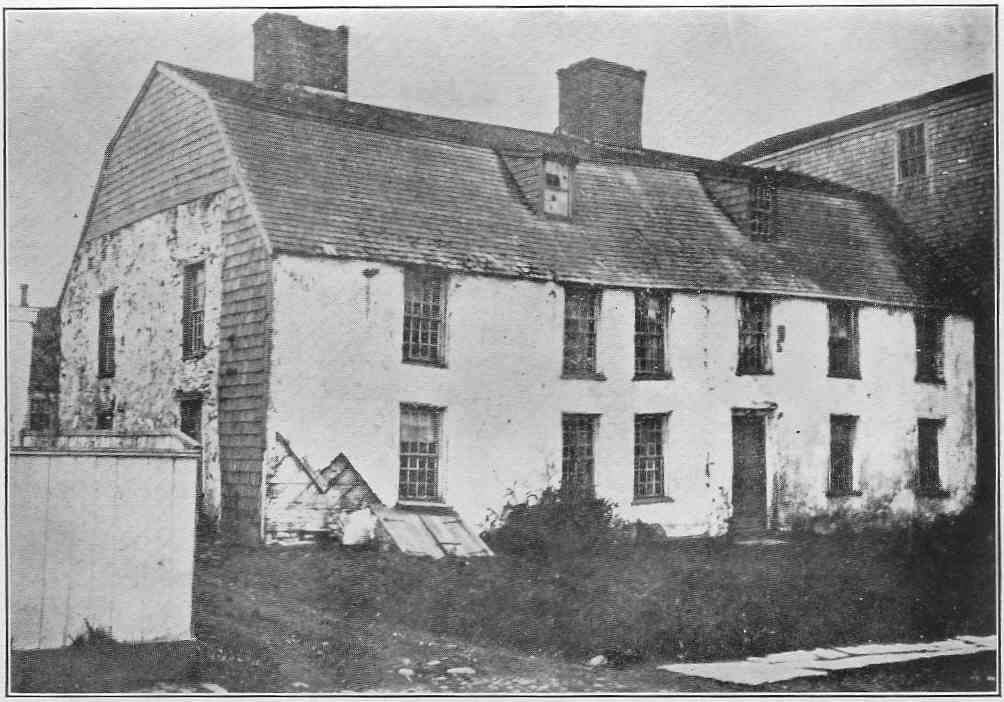
If the date of construction and the roof of the Henry Bull House was original to the circa 1639 date this would be the oldest known example of a gambrel in America.

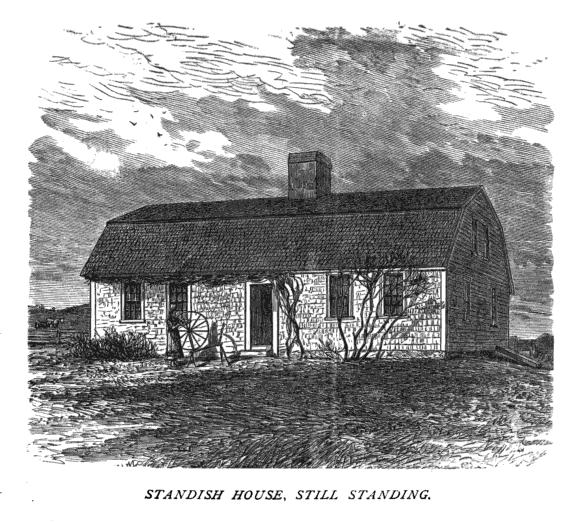
Another candidate for oldest gambrel roof, said to be from 1666, Alexander Standish House

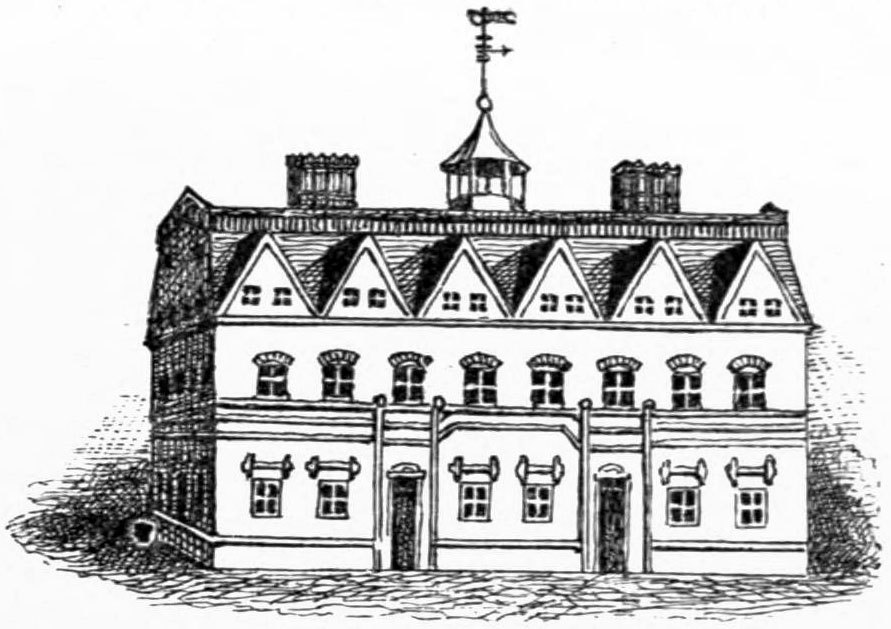
The first Harvard Hall, Harvard University, credited to be the oldest known example of a gambrel roof in North America, built c. 1677, burned 1766

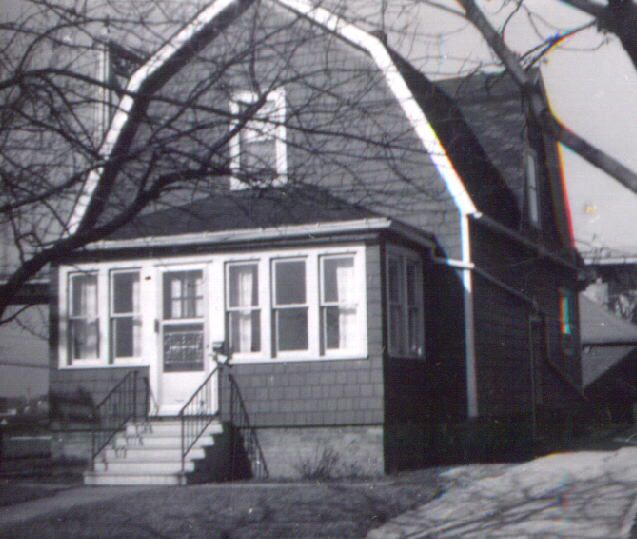
Gambrel roof seen on an East Toledo home in approximately 1937

== See also ==
- List of roof shapes

== Bibliography ==
- Corkhill, Thomas (1982). "Gambrel roof". The Complete Dictionary of Wood. Scarborough Books (1st ed.). New York: Stein and Day. p. 211. ISBN 0-8128-6142-6. OCLC 12610712.
