= Nathaniel Winsor Jr. House =

- U.S. Historic district – Contributing property

- Location within Massachusetts Location within the United States
- Location: Duxbury, Massachusetts
- Coordinates: 42°2′20.73″N 70°40′17.14″W
- Built: 1807
- Architectural style: Federal
- Part of: Old Shipbuilders Historic District (ID86001899)
- Added to NRHP: August 21, 1986

The Nathaniel Winsor Jr. House is a historic house located at 479 Washington Street Duxbury, Massachusetts, United States. It currently serves as the headquarters of the Duxbury Rural and Historical Society.

The house is a contributing property in Duxbury's Old Shipbuilder's Historic District listed on the National Register of Historic Places in 1986.

== History ==
The house was built for shipping merchant Nathaniel Winsor Jr. (September 8, 1775 – June 4, 1859) and his wife Hannah Loring Winsor (May 16, 1780 – June 9, 1850). Nathaniel Jr. was the third generation of a prosperous shipbuilding family. His grandfather, Samuel Winsor, began building small fishing vessels on Clark's Island in Plymouth Bay in the 1740s. Nathaniel's father, Nathaniel Winsor, Sr., was among the first entrepreneurs in Duxbury to commence the construction of fishing schooners on a large scale just after the American Revolution. In his youth, Nathaniel Jr. worked as a carver in his father's shipyard, carving figureheads and decorative nautical moulding. By the early 19th century, Nathaniel Jr. had inherited his father's busy fishing fleet and continued to expand the firm's operations to include international trade. Eventually, the Winsor family mercantile operation was transferred to Boston and Nathaniel Jr.'s son, Nathaniel Winsor III, took over affairs around the 1840s, creating the "Winsor Line," one of Boston's first regular lines of clipperships running between Boston and San Francisco.

In 1835, the house was purchased by Nathaniel's son-in-law, Capt. Erastus Sampson (1808–1885). Sampson had married Elizabeth Winsor (1808–1885), one of Nathaniel's daughters, in 1830. Sampson was best known as the captain of the Ship Coriolanus of Boston, built in Duxbury in 1829. The Sampson family, spending most of their time in Boston and probably summering in Duxbury, owned the house until 1893.

During the early 20th century, the house was operated by a variety of proprietors as a hotel known as the "Colonial Inn." In 1950, it was purchased by Dr. and Mrs. Edwin Leonard and operated as a bed and breakfast. It had a distinguished clientele including Buckminster Fuller, inventor of the geodesic dome, Sir William Hawthorne, Master of Churchill College, Cambridge, and actress Margaret Hamilton, best known as the Wicked Witch of the West in the film The Wizard of Oz.

In 1997, after a community fundraising effort, the house was purchased by the Duxbury Rural and Historical Society for use as their headquarters. The building currently houses the offices of the Rural and Historical Society and serves as a site for public and private functions.

== Architecture ==
The house is recognized for its high Federal style architecture and grand scale. Five bays wide and a full three storeys high, its low roofline is nearly masked by its cornice, so that it presents a rectangle to the road. Full height pilasters mark the corners. The doorway features a half elliptical or demilune fanlight and side lights, expressing the generous width of the central hall behind. Above is a central Serlian window lighting the wide upper hall. In Duxbury, where the Federal period houses are typically more conservative, the Nathaniel Winsor Jr. House is unusual, as there are very few of its advanced style on the South Shore of Massachusetts. Its builders were clearly influenced by the residences designed by Charles Bulfinch and Asher Benjamin. According to tradition, some of the interior carving was done by Nathaniel Winsor Jr. himself.

== The Winsor Family ==
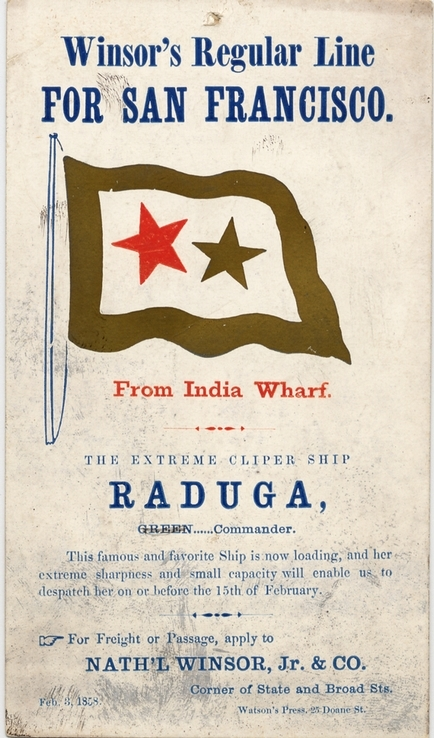
Clipper ship card

Nathaniel and Hannah raised ten children in the house. The eight sons all became involved in maritime occupations. "The Winsor Line" managed by Nathaniel Winsor III continued in operation until 1907. Another son, Capt. Charles Winsor, led a successful career as a clippership captain and eventually became the keeper of East Brother Lighthouse in San Francisco Bay. One of Nathaniel Jr.'s grandchildren, Justin Winsor, became one of the nation's leading historians, head of the Boston Public Library, and a pioneer in the field of library science.
