= Captain Daniel Bradford House =

Historic house in Massachusetts, United States

- U.S. National Register of Historic Places
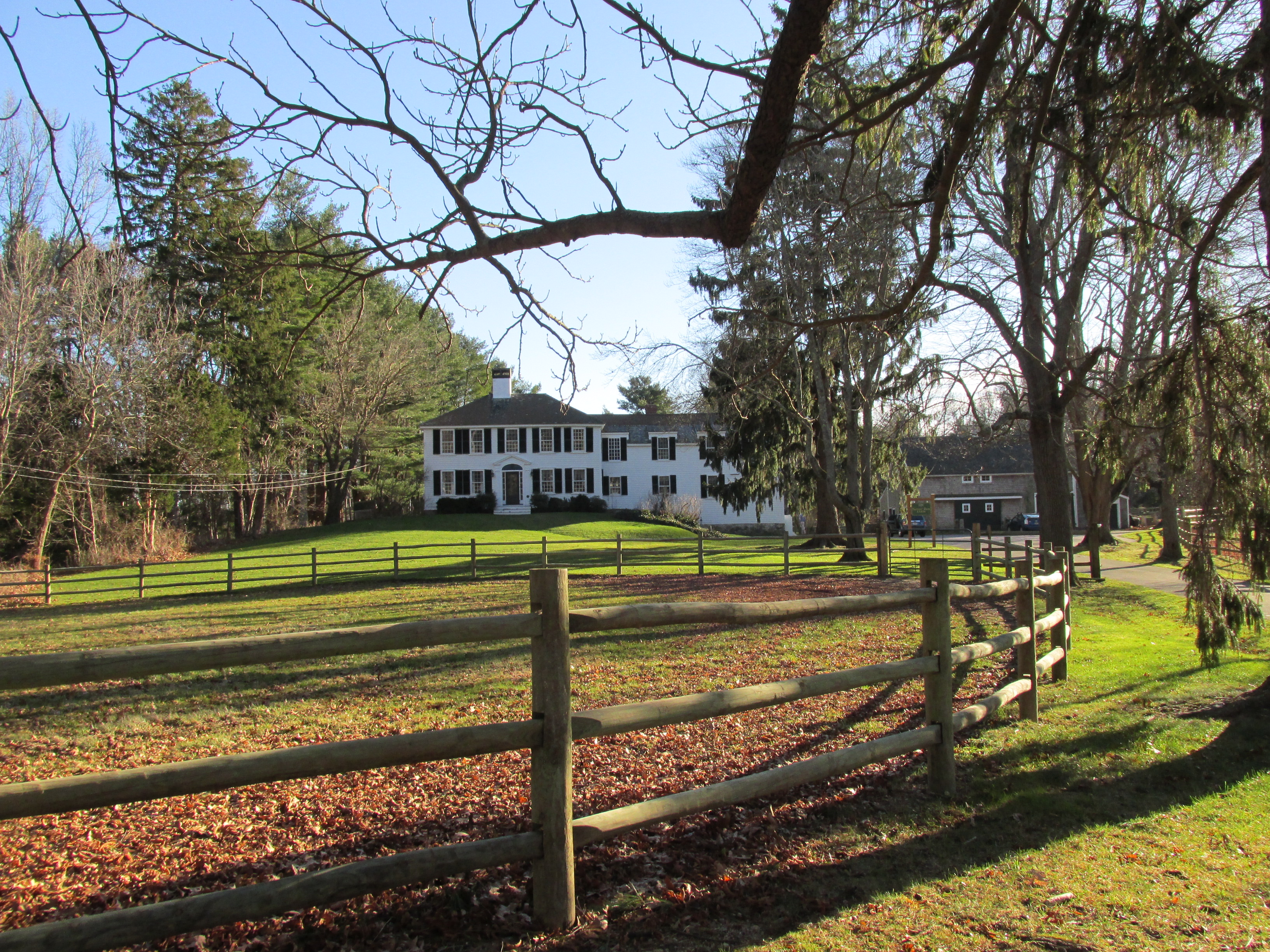

- Location within Massachusetts Location within the United States
- Location: 251 Harrison Street, Duxbury, Massachusetts
- Coordinates: 42°2′21″N 70°41′8″W
- Built: 1808
- Architectural style: Federal
- NRHP reference No.: 86000301
- Added to NRHP: February 20, 1986

The Captain Daniel Bradford House is a historic house in Duxbury, Massachusetts. The 2 1/2-story wood-frame house was built in 1808 by Captaian Daniel Bradford, on land belonging to his father, Colonel Gamaliel Bradford. It is five bays wide and three deep, with a hip roof and large central chimney. The front entry is flanked by sidelight windows and pilasters, above which are a fanlight and a gable. A two-story ell is attached to the right side of the house.

The house was listed on the National Register of Historic Places in 1986.

== See also ==
- Capt. Gamaliel Bradford House
- National Register of Historic Places listings in Plymouth County, Massachusetts
