= Justin Winsor =

American librarian and historian (1831–1897)

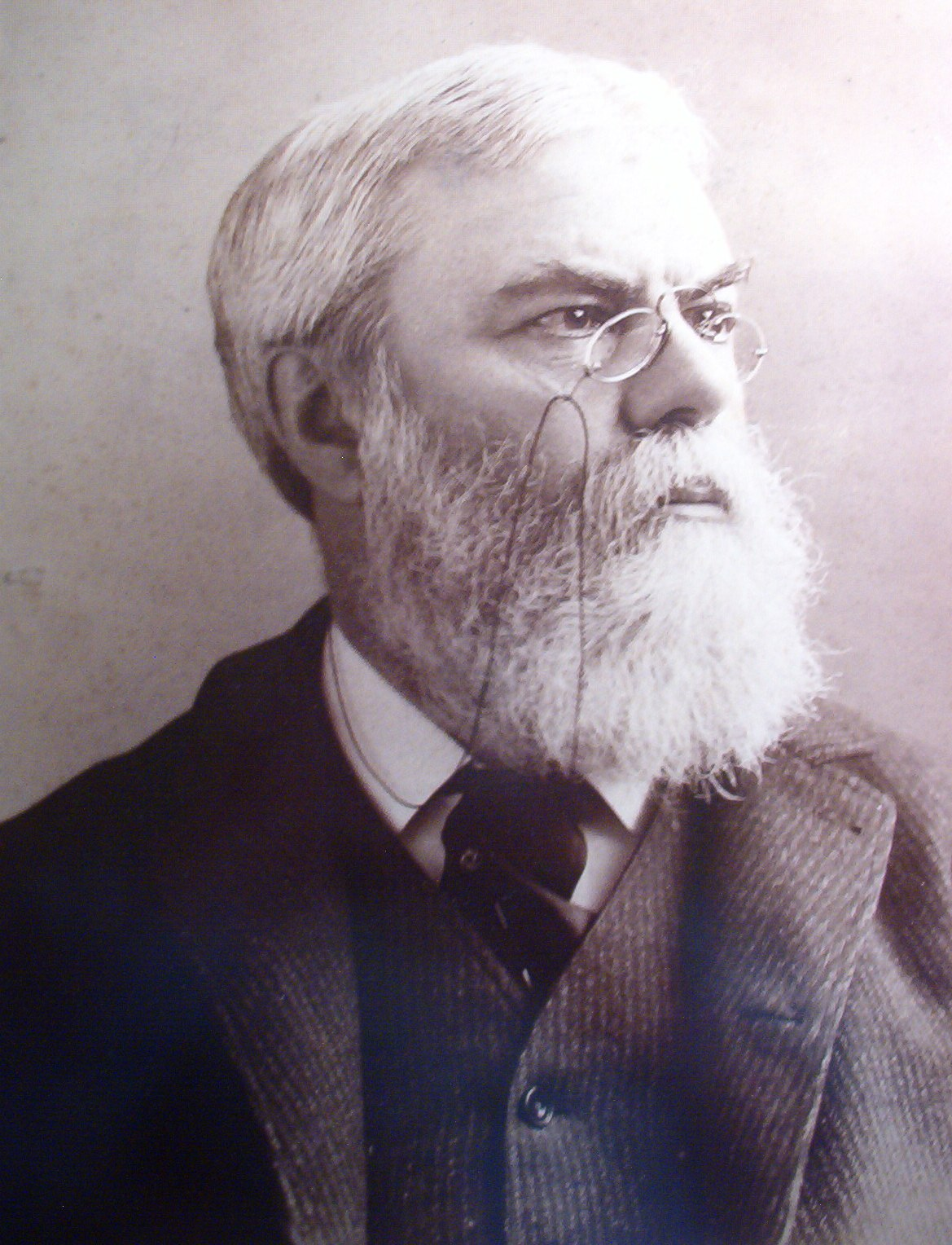
- Justin Winsor c. 1885

President of the American Library Association
- In office July 1897 – October 1897
- Preceded by: William Howard Brett
- Succeeded by: Rutherford P. Hayes
- In office 1876–1885
- Succeeded by: William Frederick Poole

President of the American Historical Association
- In office 1887
- Preceded by: George Bancroft
- Succeeded by: William Frederick Poole

Personal details
- Born: January 2, 1831 Boston, Massachusetts
- Died: October 22, 1897 (aged 66) Cambridge, Massachusetts
- Spouse: Caroline Tufts Barker (m. 1855)
- Parents: Nathaniel Winsor III; Ann Thomas Howland
- Occupation: Librarian; historian; author
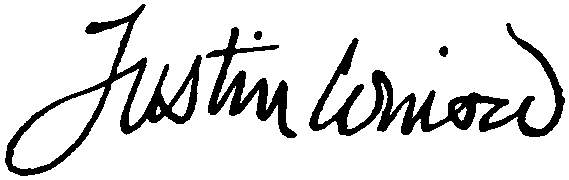
- Signature

Justin Winsor (January 2, 1831 – October 22, 1897) was an American writer, librarian, and historian. His historical work had strong bibliographical and cartographical elements. He was an authority on the early history of North America and was elected the first president of the American Library Association as well as the third president of the American Historical Association.

== Background and education ==
Winsor was born in Boston, Massachusetts, son of Nathaniel Winsor III (1806 – c. 1890) and Ann Thomas Howland Winsor (1809–1893). His father was a shipping merchant who had established the "Winsor Line", one of the first regular lines of clipperships between Boston and San Francisco. Shortly before Winsor’s birth, his parents had moved to Boston from Duxbury, Massachusetts, where the Winsor family had been involved in shipbuilding for generations. His grandfather's home, the Nathaniel Winsor, Jr. House, is now the headquarters of the Duxbury Rural and Historical Society.

Justin Winsor graduated from the Boston Latin School. He entered Harvard, but left in his senior year and never finished his education at the university. Around this time he planned a memoir of Garrick and his Contemporaries, of which the manuscript and notes are preserved in Harvard Library. He then studied in Paris and Heidelberg. Winsor would return to Harvard to complete his studies in 1868. He would go on to complete L.L. D. at the University of Michigan in 1887.

== Family ==
In 1855, Winsor married Caroline Tufts Barker (1830–1911), daughter of Ebenezer and Sally Fuller Barker of Charlestown, Massachusetts. They had two children, Mary (born 1860) who died in infancy, and Constance (c. 1861 – 1895).

== Writer and editor ==
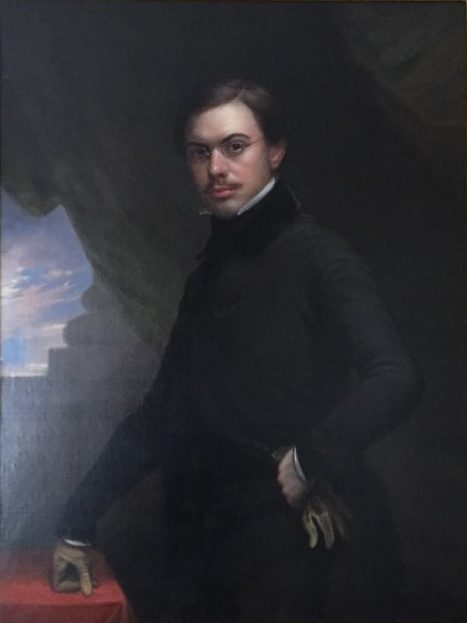
Winsor at age 19, portrait by Thomas Badger

Justin Winsor published his first book, A History of the Town of Duxbury (1849), during his first year at Harvard. He contributed to many periodicals, and, in addition to editing many smaller works, he edited some of the most important historical works of the 19th century, among them: Reader's Handbook of American History (1879), The Memorial History of Boston (4 vols., 1880–1881) and the Narrative and Critical History of America (8 vols., 1884–1889). The latter was a standard history reference for decades.

== Librarian ==
=== Boston Public Library ===
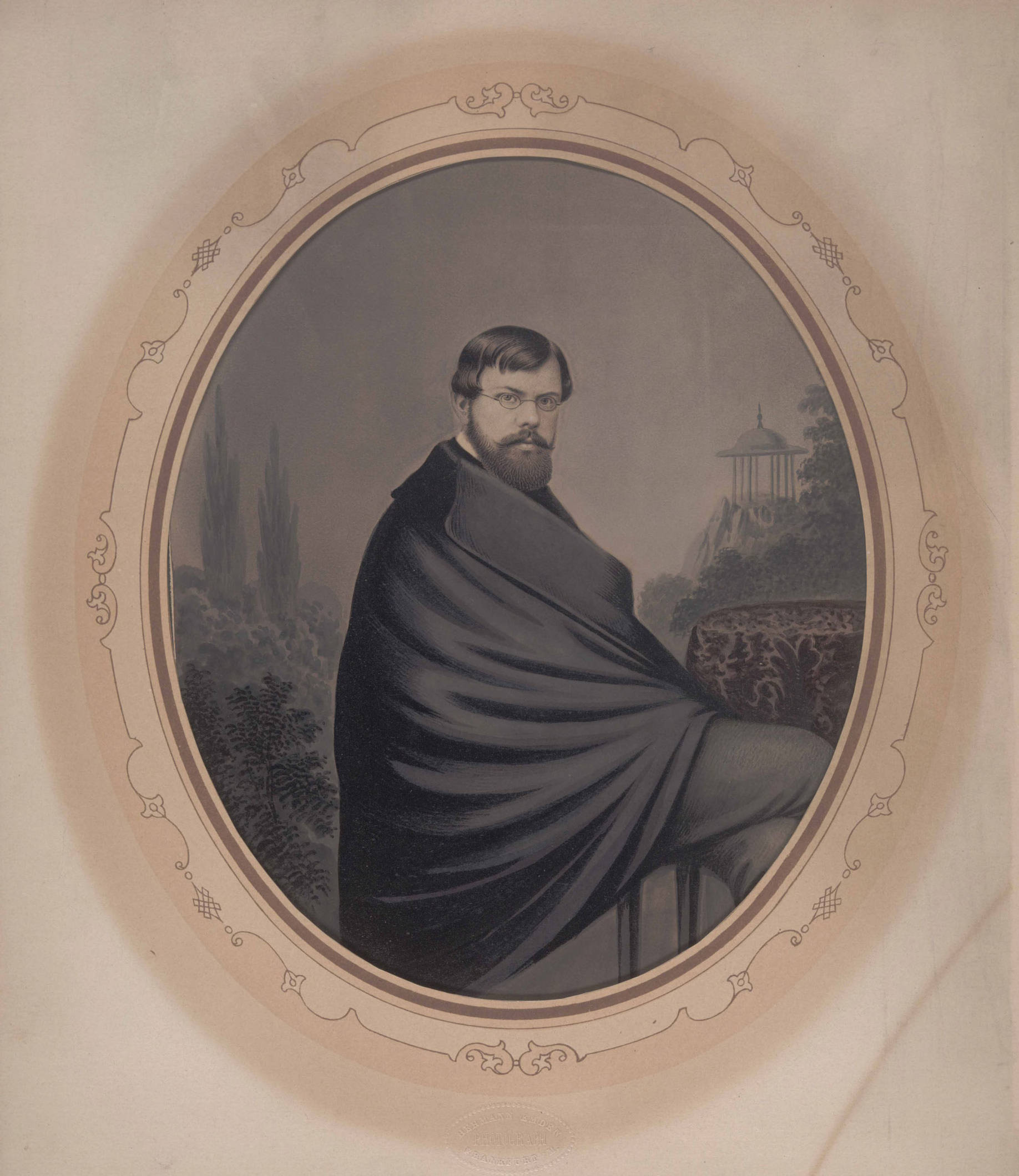
Winsor in 1854, at age 23

Winsor was one of the creators of the librarian profession, a strong proponent of the ability of libraries to uplift, and a leader in the effort to make libraries the center of universities. He started his library career as a trustee (1867–1868), then superintendent (1868–1877) of the Boston Public Library. As a member of the Boston Brahmins, Winsor found an opportunity to engage in social reform while pursuing intellectual interests. He reflected the Brahmins' strong belief in self-help, uplift, and social progress. They espoused the Socratic idea that knowledge creates virtue and Winsor saw the public library as a way to educate common people so that the traditional order of the republic would be maintained.

At Boston Public Library, Winsor undertook many projects used to track and help library use. He employed innovative statistical analysis of the library's use and used the finding to promote the idea that libraries were not just institutions and repositories of books, but were a process. He also dedicated a great deal of attention to the compilation of bibliographies and guides to public reading. Also, Winsor annotated the catalog to give it an educational character. In an effort to increase book use, he worked for the establishment of branch libraries, extended hours, and relaxed restrictions on use.

=== Harvard Librarian ===
In 1877, following a struggle with Alderman Hugh O'Brien over the professionalism of library management, Winsor left Boston Public Library to become librarian of Harvard University, where he served until his death. In his dual career as librarian-historian, he was a prototype of the ideal academic librarian.

Winsor came to Harvard at a time when research was gaining emphasis. Faculty and students assumed ready access to large collections. Winsor wanted to make the library the center of the university. In this effort, he pushed for more books and greater accessibility, improved the catalog, informed faculty of new acquisitions, liberalized the library use policy, instituted a reserve system, and wrangled with administration over the installation of electric lights for extended hours. During this time, he also influenced the field through reports when library literature was scarce.

Winsor was also a founder of the American Library Association and the Library Journal, serving as the first president of the ALA from 1876 through 1885. In this position, he emphasized the need for trained professionals and provided a rationale for the need for libraries in combating attacks on American morals and social standards. The Library History Round Table of the ALA awards the "Justin Winsor Prize", established in 1978, for exceptional library history essays.

Winsor is a member of the Library Hall of Fame.

== Historian ==
He was elected a member of the American Academy of Arts and Sciences in 1878 and the American Antiquarian Society in 1880. He also served on the Massachusetts Archives Commission for many years. Winsor was a founding member of the American Historical Association and served as their third president during the 1886–1887 term. In 1893, he was elected to the American Philosophical Society. The Justin Winsor Prize was the first prize established by the AHA and was awarded from 1896 through 1930 and from 1936 through 1938.

== Death ==
Following illness over a period of time, Winsor dealt with a strangulated hernia while staying at his home in Cambridge, Massachusetts. An operation was done on October 17, 1897, which slightly improved his condition. However, on October 22, Winsor died following a fever as a result of the hernia. His death was mourned by the Academic Library community as well as the Harvard University community. Winsor's funeral would be held at the Appleton Church on October 23, 1897, which would later be replaced by the Memorial Church of Harvard University.

== Works by Winsor ==
- Bibliography of the Original Quartos and Folios of Shakespeare, with Particular Reference to Copies in America (1876)
- Reader's Hand-Book of the American Revolution, 1761-'83 (1880); 1895 edition
- Was Shakespeare Shapleigh? A Correspondence in Two Entanglements (1887), a lampoon of Baconian theory of Shakespeare authorship that puts forward fictional character Sir William Shapleigh as author.
- Christopher Columbus (1891), called by The New International Encyclopædia a very iconoclastic book
- From Cartier to Frontenac: A Study of Geographical History in the Interior of North America in Its Historical Relations, 1534–1700 (1894)
- Exploration of the Mississippi Basin (1895)
- A Report on the Maps of the Orinoco-Essequibo Region, prepared at the request of the Venezuela Boundary Commission.

=== Pamphlets ===
- Gov. Bradford's Manuscript History of Plymouth Plantation (Cambridge, 1881)
- Arnold's Expedition against Quebec, 1775–1776 . . . (1886)
- The Manuscript Sources of American History (New York, 1887)
- Notes on the Spurious Letters of Montcalm (Cambridge, 1887)

=== Harvard series ===
He edited the series "Library of Harvard University: Bibliographical Contributions" (begun in 1887). Among his contributions to it were:

- Shakespeare's Poems: Bibliography of the Earlier Editions (1878-'9)
- Pietas et Gratulatio: Inquiry into the Authorship of the Several Pieces (1879)
- Halliwelliana: a Bibliography of the Publications of J. O. Halliwell-Phillips (1881)
- Bibliography of Ptolemy's Geography (1884)
- The Kohl Collection of Early Maps (1886)
- Calendar of the Sparks Manuscripts in Harvard College Library (1888)

=== Editor ===
- Songs of Unity, compiled with Rev. George H. Hepworth (1859)
- Justin Winsor, ed. (1880–1881), The Memorial History of Boston, Boston: James R. Osgood and Company, OCLC 4953409
  - v.1: Early and Colonial Periods
  - v.2: Provincial Period
  - v.3: Revolutionary Period. The Last Hundred Years, Pt.1
  - v.4: Last Hundred Years, Pt.2. Special topics
- Record of the 250th Anniversary of the Founding of Harvard College (1887)

=== Key writings on the library ===
- "Reading in Popular Libraries"
- "Free Libraries and Readers"
- "The President's Address [1877]"
- "First Report (1878) of Justin Winsor, Librarian of Harvard University"
- "College and Other Higher Libraries"
- "The College Library and the Classes"
- "Library Buildings"

Non-profit organization positions
New institution	President of the American Library Association; 1876–1885	Succeeded by William Frederick Poole
Preceded by William Howard Brett	President of the American Library Association; 1897	Succeeded by Rutherford P. Hayes
Preceded by George Bancroft	President of the American Historical Association; 1887	Succeeded by William Frederick Poole
