= Duxbury, Massachusetts =

- Town
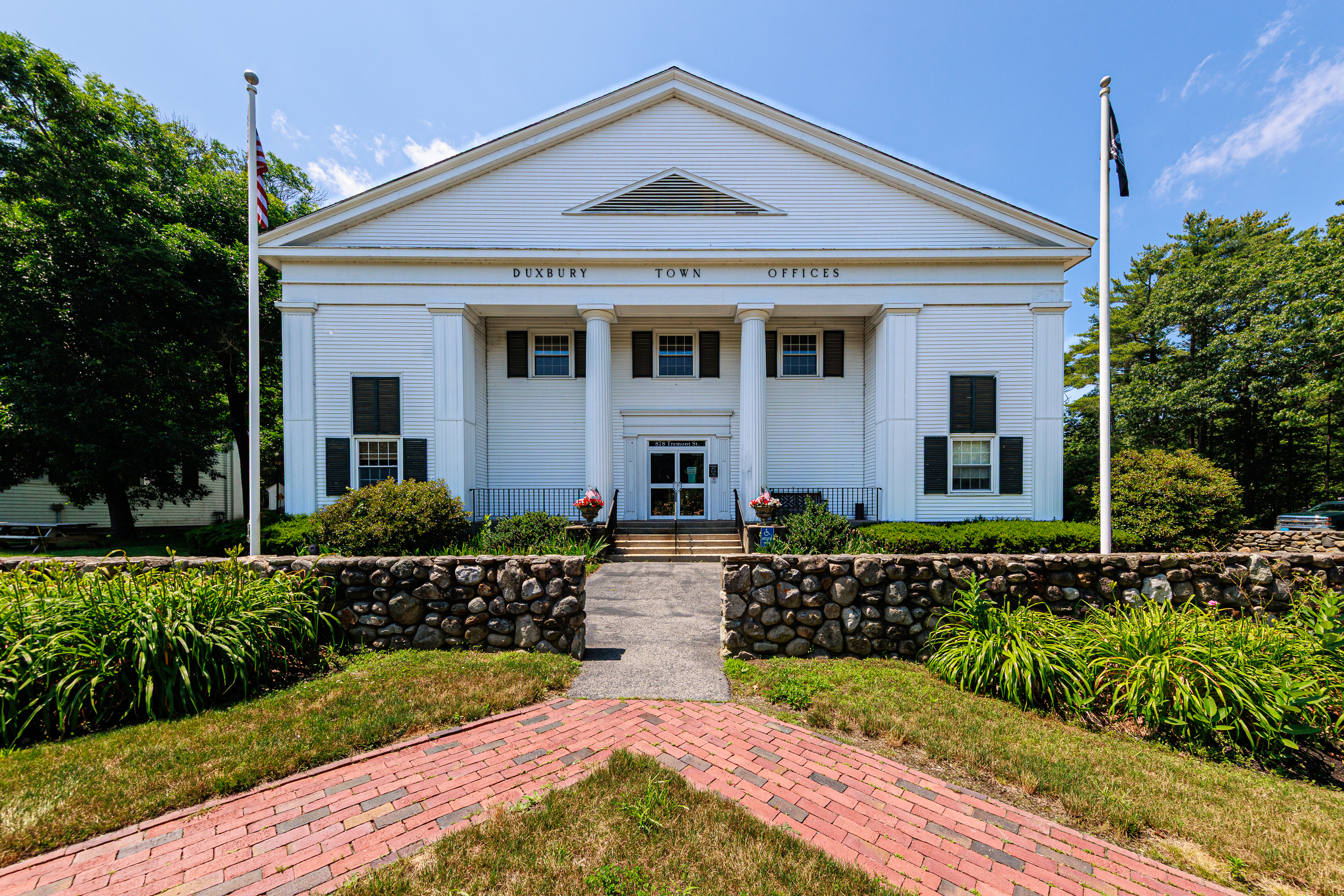
- Duxbury Town Offices

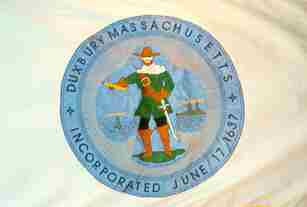
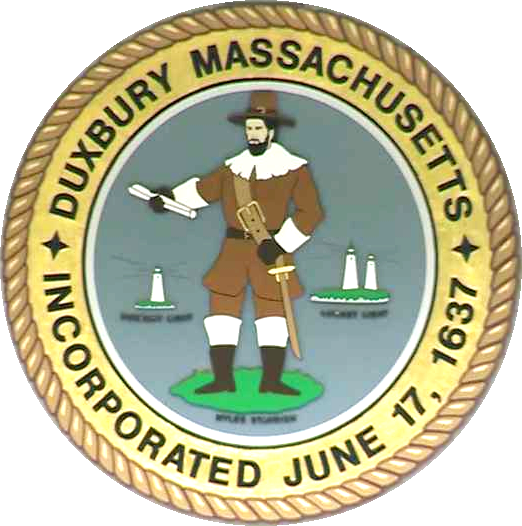
- Flag Seal

- Location of Duxbury in Massachusetts (left) and in Plymouth County (right)
- Coordinates: 42°02′30″N 70°40′22″W
- Country: United States
- State: Massachusetts
- County: Plymouth
- Settled: 1624
- Incorporated: 1637

Government
  - Type: Open town meeting

Area
  - Total: 37.6 sq mi (97.4 km^{2})
  - Land: 23.7 sq mi (61.5 km^{2})
  - Water: 13.9 sq mi (35.9 km^{2})
- Elevation: 36 ft (11 m)

Population (2020)
  - Total: 16,090
  - Density: 678/sq mi (261.6/km^{2})
- Time zone: UTC-5 (Eastern)
  - Summer (DST): UTC-4 (Eastern)
- ZIP Codes: 02331, 02332
- Area code: 339 / 781
- FIPS code: 25-17895
- GNIS feature ID: 0618338
- Website: town.duxbury.ma.us

Duxbury (alternative older spellings: "Duxborough" and "Duxboro") is a town in Plymouth County, Massachusetts, United States. A suburb located on the South Shore approximately 35 miles (56 km) to the southeast of Boston, the population was 16,090 at the 2020 census. The town contains the census-designated places (CDPs) of Duxbury, Green Harbor, and South Duxbury.

== History ==
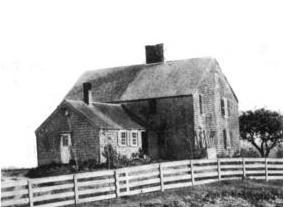
John Alden House, built c. 1700

The area now known as Duxbury was inhabited by people as early as 12,000 to 9,000 BCE. By the time European settlers arrived there, the region was inhabited by the Wampanoags, who called it Mattakeesett, meaning "place of many fish."

=== 17th century ===
In 1620, English settlers known as the Pilgrims established their colony in nearby Plymouth. Per the terms of their contract with financial backers in London, they were required to live together in a tight community for seven years. At the end of that term in 1627, land along the coast was allotted to settlers for farming. Thus, the coastline from Plymouth to Marshfield, including Duxbury, likely named after Myles Standish's ancestral home of Duxbury Hall in Chorley, was parceled out, and many settlers began moving away from Plymouth.

At first, those who settled in Duxbury came to work their new farms just in the warmer months and returned to Plymouth during the winter. It was not long, however, before they began to build homes on their land, and soon requested permission from the colony to be set off as a separate community with their own church. Duxbury, which originally included land that is now Pembroke, was incorporated in 1637.

Some of the most influential men in the colony received grants in Duxbury and became its first leaders. Captain Myles Standish, the military leader of the colony, lived in "the Nook," an area now known as Standish Shore. Elder William Brewster was for many years the religious leader of the colony, in which he led services to the colony until it received its own minister in 1637. John Alden was another important settler. His house, now a museum on Alden Street, was the site of many important meetings of the colony's leaders.

The graves of some of Duxbury's first settlers can be found in the Old Burying Ground on Chestnut Street, next to the site of the original meetinghouse.

Theory has it that the town was named by Myles Standish after the family estate of his childhood in Lancashire. The ancient Standish family in northern England owned much land and large estates, including the two main family headquarters of Standish Hall and Duxbury Manor, in Lancashire, since before the Middle Ages. Myles Standish's will delineates his inheritance rights to very particular lands near and around Standish and mostly Duxbury Manor, stating his descent from both lines of the Standish family; and so it has been suggested that he named the new town in Massachusetts after the estate where he grew up.

Duxbury was primarily a farming community throughout the 17th and 18th centuries.

=== 18th century ===
Its quiet history in the 18th century was interrupted only by the Revolutionary War. In the years leading up to the Revolutionary War, opposition to the British was quite fierce in Duxbury, with crowds meeting regularly at Captain's Hill to burn effigies of British officials in protest of the Stamp Act.

In 1775, General Thomas Gage dispatched a company of regulars to the town in response to pleas from the loyalists at Marshfield.

When the Minuteman alarm sounded on April 19, 1775, with news of the Battles of Lexington and Concord, many volunteers mustered to the regiment of Colonel Theophilus Cotton from Plymouth, Kingston, and Duxbury, and headed for Marshfield to engage the British. The colonial officers held a council of war at the home of Lt. Col. Briggs Alden in Duxbury.

Duxbury's shipbuilding era began immediately after the end of the Revolutionary War with the Treaty of Paris. The new nation was granted fishing rights on the Grand Banks, and several families took advantage of the new opportunity and began to build large fishing schooners. The schooners built in the 1790s gave way to larger brigs and eventually three-masted ships. As several merchant families began to amass large fleets, shipyards and other ancillary industries flourished and Duxbury prospered. By the 1840s, Duxbury boasted about 20 shipyards and produced an average of ten large sailing vessels per year.

The largest industry in Duxbury was owned by Ezra Weston, who came to be known as "King Caesar" due to his success and influence. Weston began building small vessels in 1764 and soon became famous for his successful merchant fleet. His son, Ezra Weston II, who inherited his father's kingly sobriquet, would bring the industry to its height.

=== 19th century ===
Lloyd's of London recognized Weston as the owner of the largest fleet in America, and this judgment was confirmed by Daniel Webster in a speech in 1841. His empire, a forerunner of vertical integration, dominated the town. The King Caesar House is now a museum owned by the Duxbury Rural and Historical Society. By 1837, there were nearly 40 shipyards along the west shore of Duxbury Bay between Captains Hill and the mouth of the Bluefish River. These shipyards were supported by a foundry, a sail loft, a ropewalk, and a spar soak where masts were stored in a pool of salt water to prevent warping before they were stepped as ships' masts. Inland farmers provided food for the ships' crews; and a bank handled the shipbuilders' money.

Demand for shallow-draft ships declined by the 1850s. Duxbury Bay was too shallow to build the deep-draft clippers and steamships dominating oceanic trade and railroads were competing for the coastal trade. While other Massachusetts towns grew, Duxbury went into a long economic decline.

There was, however, a silver lining. By the 1870s, Duxbury's rural character and unspoiled bay began to attract summer visitors. Duxbury soon gained a reputation as an idyllic summer resort. With the 1871 completion of the Duxbury & Cohasset Railroad, large numbers of city-folk from Boston could pay $1.50 for a round-trip ticket and enjoy Duxbury's refreshing environment. Boarding houses sprang up everywhere. The Miles Standish Hotel on the Nook soon became enormously popular. The Myles Standish monument, completed in 1898, was a result of this tourist influx.

=== 20th century ===
The Maritime House flag of the Winsor Line, managed by Nathaniel Winsor III, continued in operation until 1907.

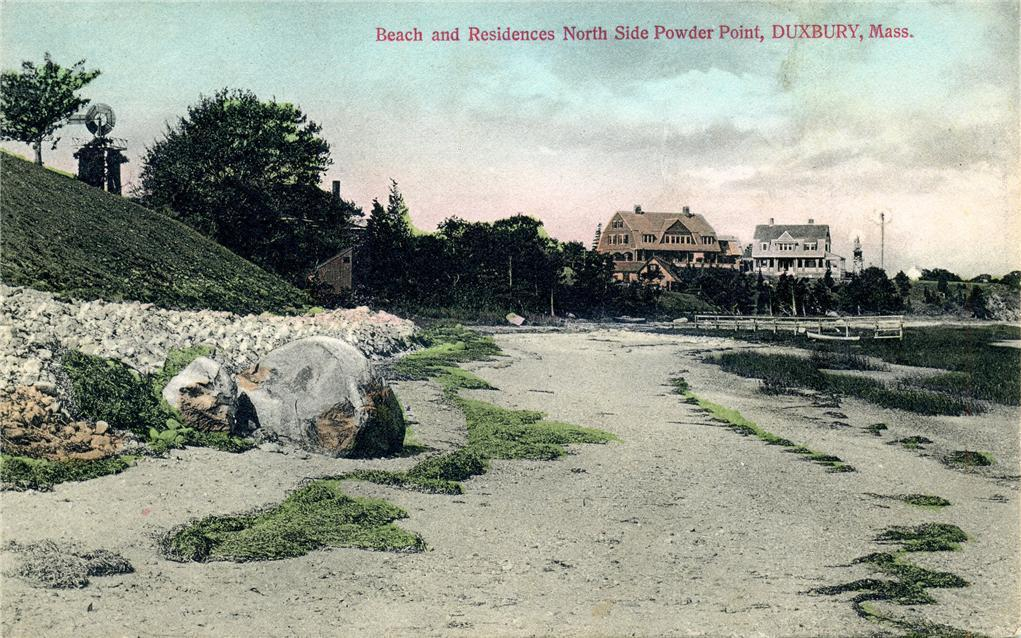
Duxbury's beach and residences, c. 1910

This pattern continued in Duxbury well into the 20th century. It was not until the construction of Route 3 that transportation to Boston became expedient and the town's population rose further with the arrival of thousands of year-round residents.

=== 21st century ===
In July 2026, the town became the subject of the highly publicized trial of Duxbury resident Lindsay Clancy, who strangled her 3 children to death.

== Geography ==
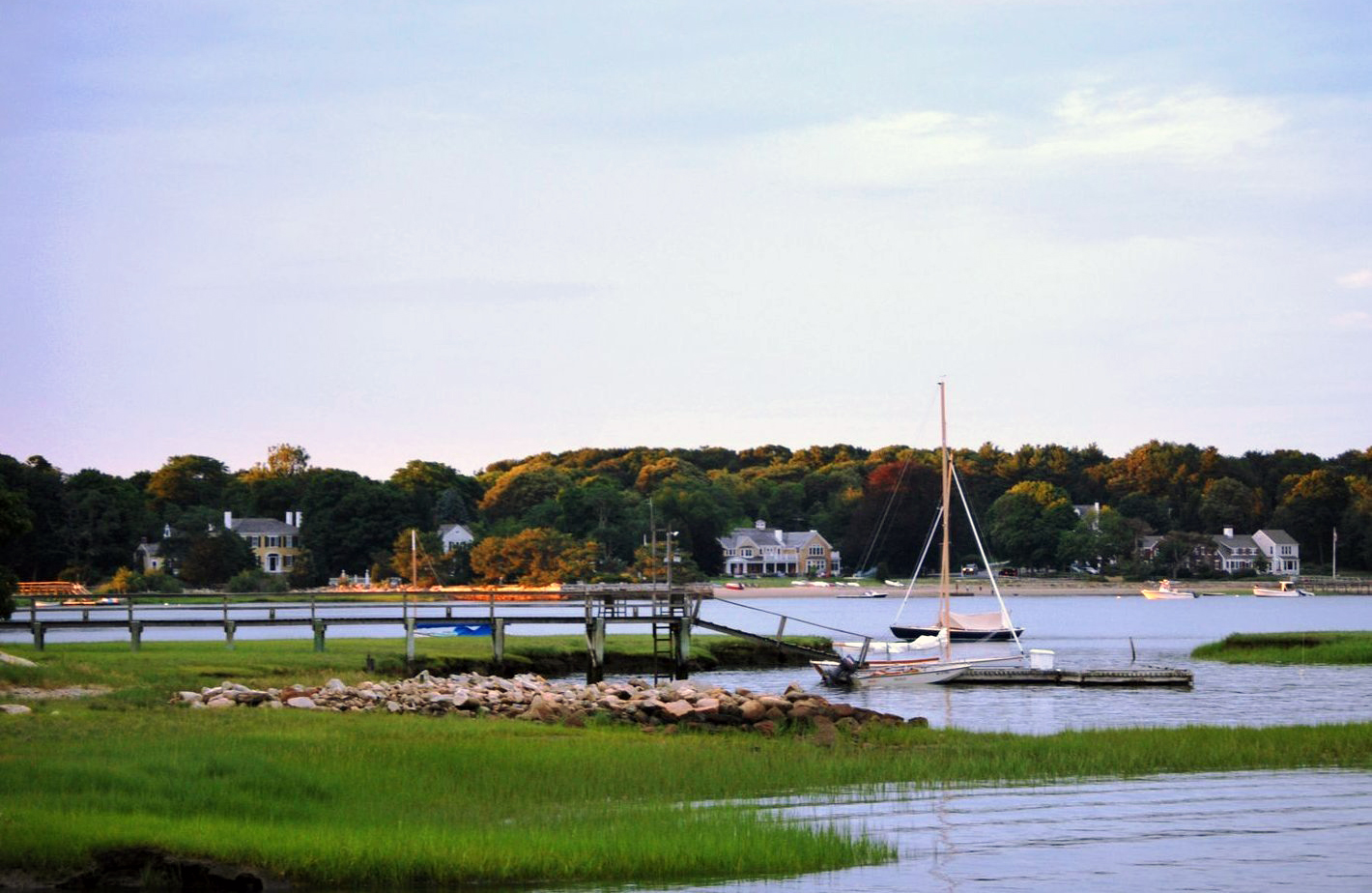
The Bluefish River inlet with King Caesar House in the background

According to the United States Census Bureau, the town has a total area of 37.6 square miles (97 km^{2}), of which 23.8 square miles (62 km^{2}) is land and 13.9 square miles (36 km^{2}) (36.87%) is water. Duxbury is bordered by Cape Cod Bay to the east, Duxbury Bay, Kingston Bay, and Plymouth to the southeast, Kingston to the southwest, Pembroke to the west and northwest, and Marshfield to the north. The town's border with Plymouth is due to the town's having the only land access to Saquish Neck, a thin, hook-shaped strip of land along Duxbury Bay, at the tip of which is Saquish Head in Plymouth.

Duxbury is the sixth largest cranberry producer in Massachusetts and has oyster beds and other shellfish.

The town has many ponds and bogs throughout. The Back River lies along the western edge of Saquish Neck, and has many tributaries from the local rivers, brooks, and marshes. There are several sanctuaries, a conservation area and other forests within the town, especially in the western half.

== Demographics ==
Historical population
Year	Pop.	±%
1790	1,457	—
1850	2,679	+83.9%
1860	2,597	−3.1%
1870	2,341	−9.9%
1880	2,196	−6.2%
1890	1,908	−13.1%
1900	2,075	+8.8%
1910	1,688	−18.7%
1920	1,553	−8.0%
1930	1,696	+9.2%
1940	2,359	+39.1%
1950	3,167	+34.3%
1960	4,727	+49.3%
1970	7,636	+61.5%
1980	11,807	+54.6%
1990	13,895	+17.7%
2000	14,248	+2.5%
2010	15,059	+5.7%
2020	16,090	+6.8%
2024*	16,377	+1.8%
* = population estimate. Source: United States census records and Population Estimates Program data.

As of the census of 2010, there were 15,059 people, 5,344 households, and 4,162 families residing in the town. The population density was 632.7 inhabitants per square mile (244.3/km^{2}). There were 5,875 housing units at an average density of 246.7 per square mile (95.3/km^{2}). The racial makeup of the town was 98.0% White, 0.60% Black or African American, 0.30% Native American, 1.40% Asian, 0.10% Pacific Islander, 0.50% from other races, and 0.80% from two or more races. Hispanic or Latino of any race were 1.20% of the population.

There were 5,344 households, of which 38.7% had children under the age of 18 living with them, 68.1% were married couples living together, 7.4% had a female householder with no husband present, and 22.1% were non-families. 19.5% of all households were made up of individuals, and 11.8% had someone living alone who was 65 years of age or older. The average household size was 2.79 and the average family size was 3.23.

In the town, the population was spread out, with 22.6% under the age of 15; 7.6% from 15 to 19; 5.3% from 20 to 29; 7.0% from 30 to 39; 17.5% from 40 to 49; 23.7% from 50 to 64 and 16.3% who were 65 years of age or older. The median age was 44.8 years. For every 100 females, there were 92.6 males. For every 100 females age 18 and over, there were 88.5 males.

The median income for a household in the town was $117,124; and the median income for a family was $136,245. Males had a median income of $77,228 versus $41,730 for females. The per capita income for the town was $50,242. About 1.2% of families and 2.3% of the population were below the poverty line, including 3.1% of those under age 18 and 3.1% of those age 65 or over.

== Government ==
On the national level, Duxbury is a part of Massachusetts's 9th congressional district, and is currently represented by Bill Keating. The state's senior (Class II) member of the United States Senate, elected in 2012, is Elizabeth Warren. The junior (Class I) senator is Ed Markey.

On the state level, Duxbury is represented in the Massachusetts House of Representatives as a part of the Sixth Plymouth district; the Sixth includes the Town of Duxbury, and portions of the Towns of Hanson, Halifax, Marshfield, and Pembroke. The town is represented in the Massachusetts Senate as a part of the Plymouth and Norfolk district, which includes the towns of Cohasset, Duxbury, Hingham, Hull, Marshfield, Norwell, Scituate and Weymouth. The town is patrolled by the First (Norwell) Barracks of Troop D of the Massachusetts State Police.

Duxbury is governed by the open town meeting form of government, and is led by a town manager and a board of selectmen. The town operates its own police and fire departments, with the police station and central fire station located in the southeast and additional fire station in the northwest parts of town. There are two post offices in town; one is at Hall's Corner (near Goose Point) and the other is at Snug Harbor, along Duxbury Bay just south of Powder Point.

The Duxbury Free Library is located in the heart of town, next to the John Alden House, and is a member of the Old Colony Library Network. The town also has a highway department, located behind the Town Hall, and a harbormaster, whose office is located next to the Duxbury Yacht Club near Snug Harbor. Duxbury is located within ten miles (16 km) of the Pilgrim Nuclear Power Station, and as such has a well-organized emergency management agency. The nearest hospitals are Jordan Hospital in Plymouth, South Shore Hospital in Weymouth, and Brockton Hospital.

Voter Registration and Party Enrollment as of August 24, 2024
Party	Number of Voters	Percentage
Democratic	2,356	17.98%
Republican	1,951	14.89%
Unaffiliated	8,666	66.15%
Libertarian	34	0.26%
All Others	94	0.72%
Total	13,101	100%

== Education ==
=== Public schools ===
Over $26 million of Duxbury's annual budget is devoted to the town's nationally recognized public school system. According to Newsweek magazine's 2005, 2006, and 2007 rankings of the Nation's Top 1200 Public High Schools (the top 5% of public school systems), Duxbury was ranked at 246, 185, and 142 respectively. By 2013, it had fallen off of the Newsweek national rankings and locally, Boston Magazine's yearly town/school rankings, dropped it out of a top-40 spot.

Duxbury operates its own school system for the town's approximately 3,400 students, serving preschool through 12th grade. Chandler School is located near Tree of Knowledge Corner in the west of town and serves students from pre-kindergarten through second grade. The Alden Elementary School, near the John Alden House, serves grades 3–5.

Duxbury Middle/High School is located on Alden Street and serves grades 6–12. Duxbury High School was rebuilt into a combined building along with Duxbury Middle School, called the 21st Learning experience. Duxbury's athletic teams are known as the Dragons, and their colors are green and white. Their chief rival is Marshfield High School, team mascot the Rams, and they play against them in the Thanksgiving Day Tournament. It is a local event whose rivalry goes back 30 years.

=== Private schools ===
There are two private schools located in Duxbury. Bay Farm Montessori Academy is a private, independent school located in the southern corner of town and serves Toddlers through grade 8. Good Shepherd Christian Academy is a private, Christian school which serves students from kindergarten through eighth grade. The nearest private high school was the now closed Sacred Heart in Kingston. The town has no vocational schools.

== Transportation ==
=== Bus ===
For buses in Duxbury, the local Greater Attleboro Taunton Regional Transit Authority (GATRA) bus passes through the town on the SAIL line (Seaside Area Inter-town Link) and it stops at Halls Corner shopping district (South Duxbury), Island Creek, Millbrook Motors (Cox Corner), and the Duxbury Free Library (Millbrook). Another Bus Line that goes through Duxbury is the P&B Line (Plymouth & Brockton) which stops at Millbrook Motors (Cox Corner). The last bus line that goes through Duxbury is the Greyhound Bus Line which runs national service and into Canada, which stops at Millbrook Motors (Cox Corner).

=== Road ===
Route 3, a two-lane freeway also known as the Pilgrims Highway, passes through the town, with exits 20 and 22 granting access to the town from it. Routes 3A, 14, 53 and 139 also pass through the town. Routes 14 and 139 both end in the town, and Route 53 ends less than 1/2 mile (0.80 km) south of the town line, at its intersection with Route 3A in Kingston.

=== Other ===
Just south of Duxbury, the nearest MBTA Commuter Rail station is Kingston station, not far from the town line. The nearest municipal airport is Marshfield Municipal Airport as well as Logan International Airport in Boston being the nearest national and major airport. There are no bicycle paths or bicycle lanes. A few of the roads in the town have sidewalks.

== Notable people ==
- Ichabod Alden, American Revolutionary War officer
- John Alden, Mayflower immigrant and one of Duxbury's founders
- John Alden Jr., son of John Alden who was convicted of witchcraft in the Salem Witch Trials and survived by breaking out of prison and later writing a book about the trials
- Charlotte Bradford, American Civil War nurse
- Love Brewster, a founder of Duxbury
- Elder William Brewster (c. 1567–1644), the Pilgrim leader, spiritual elder of the Plymouth Colony, passenger on the Mayflower, and a founder of Duxbury
- John Malcolm Brinnin, Canadian-born poet and literary critic
- Peter Chandler, soccer player
- Bill Curley, former professional basketball player, San Antonio Spurs
- Captain Amasa Delano, captain of the 19th century merchant ship Bachelors Delight
- Edmund Freeman, Plymouth Colony's deputy governor under William Bradford and Edward Winslow
- Juliana Hatfield, indie rock singer
- Scott Woodruff, frontman of Reggae band Stick Figure
- George Partridge, Continental Congress delegate and representative to the 1st United States Congress
- Joe Perry, lead guitarist, Aerosmith
- George Soule, a Mayflower Pilgrim, signer of the Mayflower Compact, and one of Duxbury's founders
- Myles Standish, deputy governor, Mayflower settler, and a Duxbury founder
- Ezra Weston II, 19th century shipbuilding merchant
- Henry Samson, Mayflower passenger
- Olga Owens Huckins, friend of Rachel Carson whose letter about birds in her backyard inspired Silent Spring
- Lindsay Clancy, who, allegedly, fatally strangled her three children

== Points of interest ==
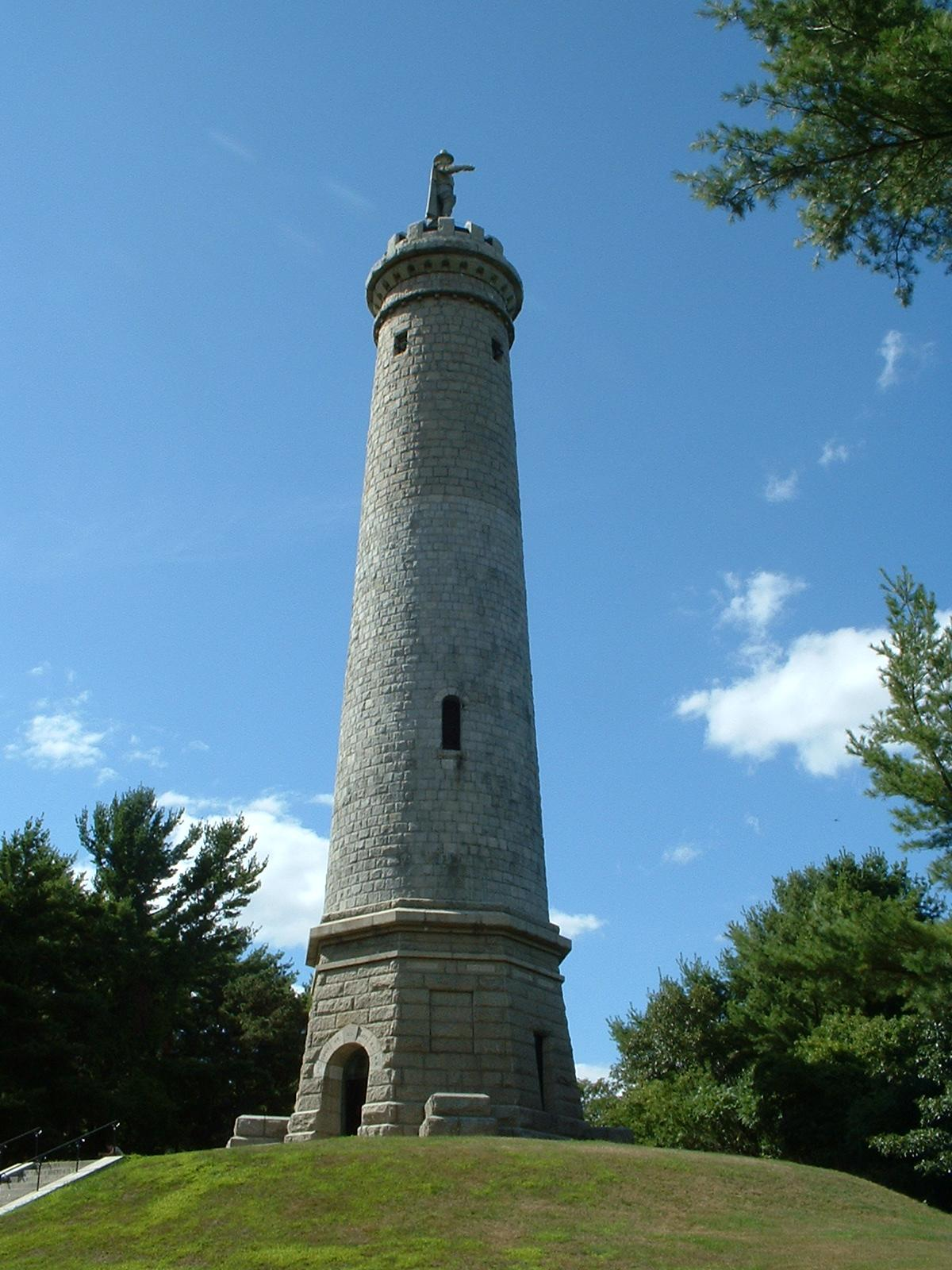
The Myles Standish Monument, not far from the site of his home

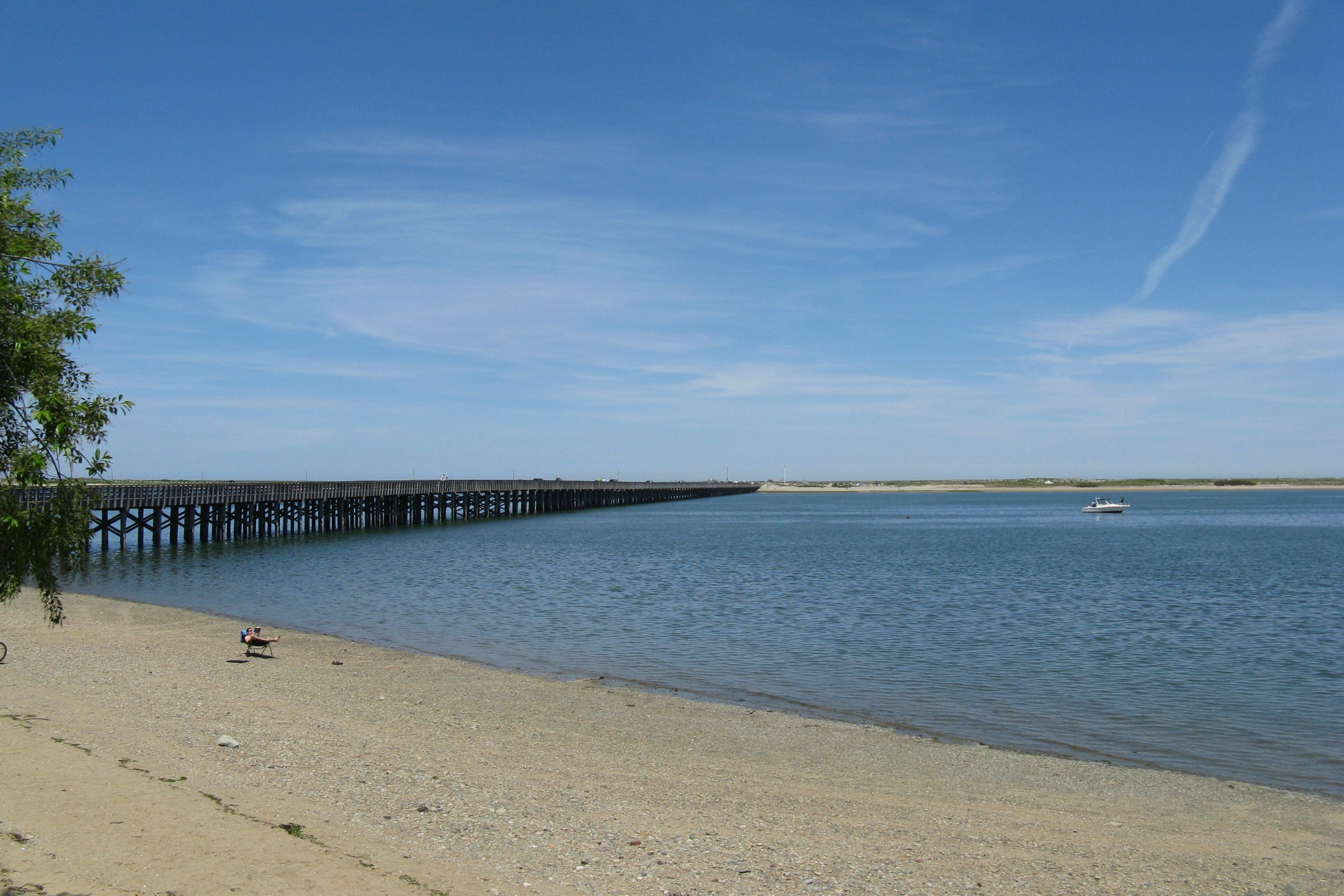
Powder Point Bridge

- Alexander Standish House, built in 1666
- Art Complex Museum: the Carl A. Weyerhaeuser collection
- Captain Daniel Bradford House
- Capt. Gamaliel Bradford House
- Duxbury Beach
- Duxbury Free Library
- Duxbury Yacht Club near Snug Harbor was founded in 1875 and incorporated in 1895. As part of the club's 120th anniversary celebrations, David A. Mittell wrote "The Duxbury Yacht Club Story."
- First Parish Church, Unitarian Universalist: Founded in 1632 by the Pilgrims, it was the second religious body of the Plymouth Colony.
- Capt. Gershom Bradford House: This early 19th-century house remains virtually untouched from when it was built and furnished by the seafaring captain. It remained in the family for four generations until donated to the Duxbury Rural and Historical Society.
- John Alden House, built in 1653, home to Pilgrim John Alden
- King Caesar House
- Myles Standish Burial Ground, cemetery and Pilgrim burial site
- Myles Standish Monument State Reservation
- North Hill Marsh Pond: The Massachusetts Audubon Society's 129-acre (52 ha) sanctuary on Mayflower Street includes a forest, bike trails, and a 90-acre (36 ha) pond.
- Old Shipbuilder's Historic District
- Pillsbury Summer House
- Mill Pond, Island Creek Pond, Island Creek
- Camp Wing: Located in Duxbury's northeast tip, it is a summer camp with many year-round events.
- Wright Memorial Library, home of the Duxbury Student Union and the Drew Archival Library of the Duxbury Rural and Historical Society
- Nathaniel Winsor Jr. House, headquarters of the Duxbury Rural and Historical Society
- Powder Point Bridge: A wooden bridge built from Powder Point to Gurnet in 1892. The bridge was in the Guinness World Records as the longest and oldest wooden bridge in the world until it sustained some damage from a fire in 1985. The fire proved that the bridge as a whole was unstable, and in 1986 it was rebuilt in its original style and is still standing today. The bridge was also shown in the 2013 film The Way, Way Back. The bridge features prominently in the film The Equalizer 2.
- Tree of Knowledge Corner: A tri-point intersection between Elm Street, Summer Street, and South Street, where mail carriers used to drop off their mail inboxes nailed to a tree. The tree is no longer standing as it was hit by lightning but in its place is an engraved stone.

== Media ==
=== Newspapers ===
- The Duxbury Clipper
- The Duxbury Reporter (online only as Wicked Local Duxbury, published by GateHouse Media of Perinton, New York)

=== Television ===
- Duxbury Community Television (Comcast Channel 14; Verizon Channel 38)
- Duxbury Government (Comcast Channel 15; Verizon Channel 39)
- Dragon TV (Comcast Channel 14; Verizon; Channel 38)

=== Radio ===
- WDSU, internet radio

== See also ==
- Dead Boots
- John and Priscilla Alden Family Sites
- Keene Pond
- Lower Chandler Pond
- Pine Lake
- Pine Street Pond
- Round Pond
- South Shore Railroad
- Upper Chandler Pond
