= Duxbury Rural and Historical Society =

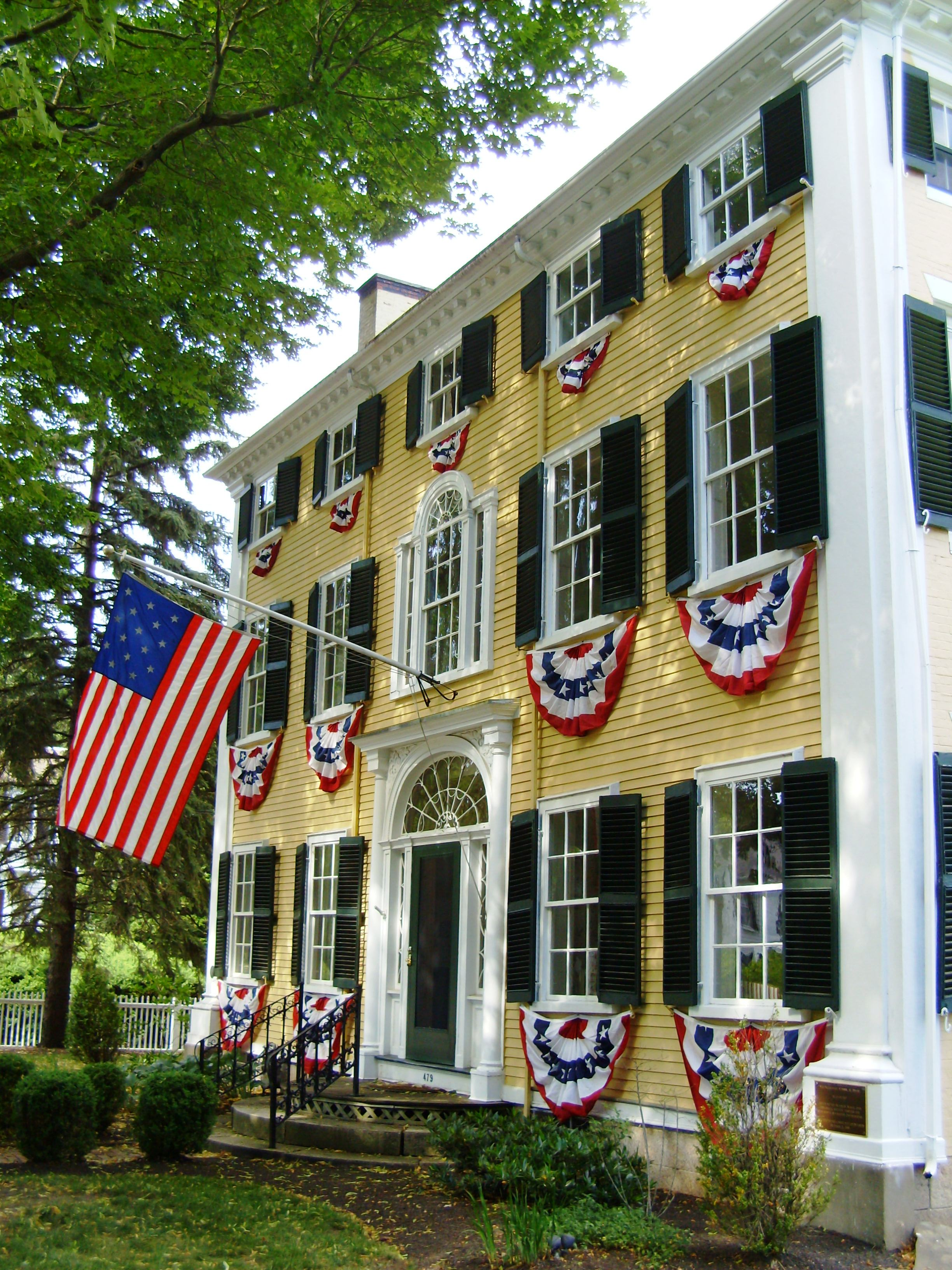
- Nathaniel Winsor Jr. House, the Society's headquarters
- Founded: 1883
- Type: Educational charitable corporation
- Location: Duxbury, Massachusetts
- Website: www.duxburyhistory.org
- Formerly called: Duxbury Rural Society

The Duxbury Rural and Historical Society (DRHS) is a non-profit organization in Duxbury, Massachusetts founded in 1883. Its mission is to "preserve and promote the heritage and rural character of the town of Duxbury and its environs." The DRHS owns several historic buildings, operates a library and archives, and maintains approximately 140 acres of conservation land in Duxbury.

== History ==
The DRHS, originally known as the Duxbury Rural Society, was founded on November 14, 1883 by a group of individuals concerned about the deteriorating condition of their community. During the early 19th century, Duxbury had been a prosperous center of wooden shipbuilding. However, with the advent of rail transport, clipper ships and steamships, Duxbury shipyards soon became obsolete. Most local shipyards closed or relocated during the 1840s and 1850s. This resulted in a decline of population and the economic condition of the town.

The original mission of the organization was to "improve and ornament the town." Early projects included installing street lamps, planting trees, building fences and erecting road signs. The DRHS soon acquired conservation land in an effort to preserve the "rural character" of the town. In the first decades of the 20th century, the group began to collect and exhibit artifacts relating to Duxbury's history. As activities of the organization increasingly came to encompass the preservation of Duxbury’s heritage, its name was changed in 1936 to the Duxbury Rural and Historical Society.

== Facilities ==
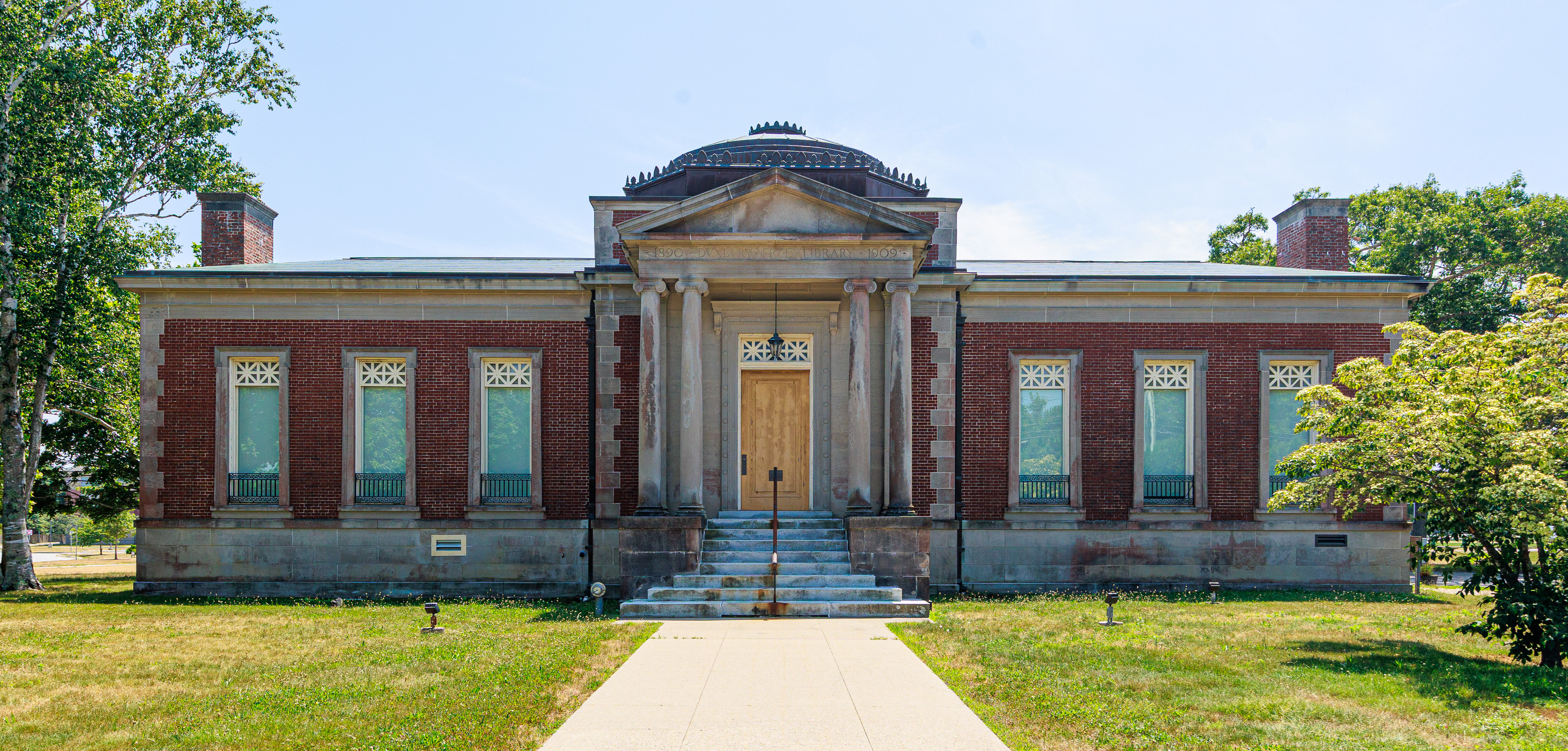
The Drew Archival Library is located in the 1909 Wright Memorial Library

The DRHS currently maintains several facilities in Duxbury. The headquarters and main office, open year-round, is located in the Nathaniel Winsor Jr. House, a historic building built in 1807. The King Caesar House, built in 1809 for merchant Ezra Weston II, is operated as a museum in the summer months and features rotating exhibits. The 1808 Capt. Gershom Bradford House is also operated as a museum in the summer months. The organization's newest facility, the Drew Archival Library, contains the Society's collection of historic documents and photographs, is located in the 1909 Wright Memorial Library and is open to researchers year-round. All four of these buildings are listed on the National Register of Historic Places.

== See also ==
- List of historical societies in Massachusetts

== Sources ==
- Hale, Robert; Pillsbury, Katherine, eds. (1987). The Duxbury Book, 1637–1987. Duxbury, Massachusetts: Duxbury Rural and Historical Society, Inc. ISBN 0-941859-00-2.
- Post, James Otis (1983). A History of the Duxbury Rural & Historical Society 1883-1983. Duxbury, Massachusetts: The Duxbury Rural and Historical Society, Inc. OCLC 45906610.
