= Alexander Standish House =

Historic house in Massachusetts, United States

- U.S. National Register of Historic Places
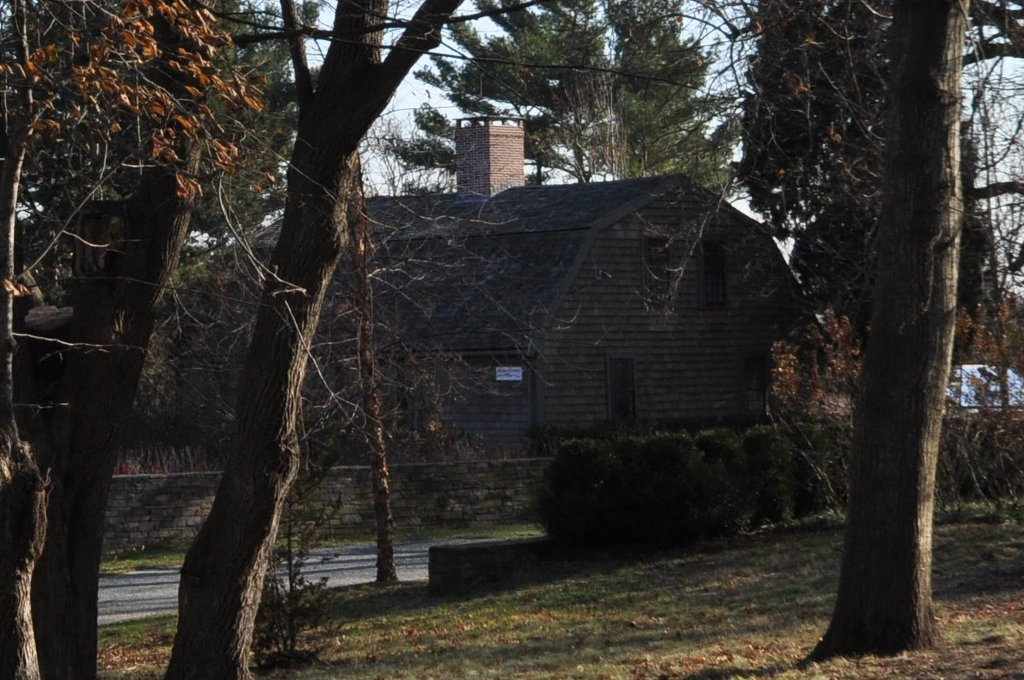

- Location within Massachusetts Location within the United States
- Nearest city: Duxbury, Massachusetts
- Coordinates: 42°0′30″N 70°40′45″W
- Built: 1666 (traditional) c.1750 (NRHP)
- NRHP reference No.: 78001407
- Added to NRHP: July 12, 1978

The Alexander Standish House is a historic house at 341 Standish Street in Duxbury, Massachusetts. It has been claimed that this house was built in 1666 by Alexander Standish (1626–1702), son of Mayflower Pilgrim, Capt. Myles Standish, but architectural analysis of the building suggests a mid-18th century construction date. Documentary evidence is also weak, suggesting that when the property passed to Alexander Standish's grandson in 1739, the house standing on it did not resemble this one. The house is a 1 1/2-story gambrel-roofed wood-frame structure, with five bays on the front facade and a central chimney, on which the date "1666" has been painted. It has been relatively little-altered since c. 1879, when a lithograph was made.

The house was added to the National Register of Historic Places in 1978.

== See also ==
- List of the oldest buildings in Massachusetts
- National Register of Historic Places listings in Plymouth County, Massachusetts
