= Capt. Gershom Bradford House =

Historic house in Massachusetts, United States

- U.S. National Register of Historic Places
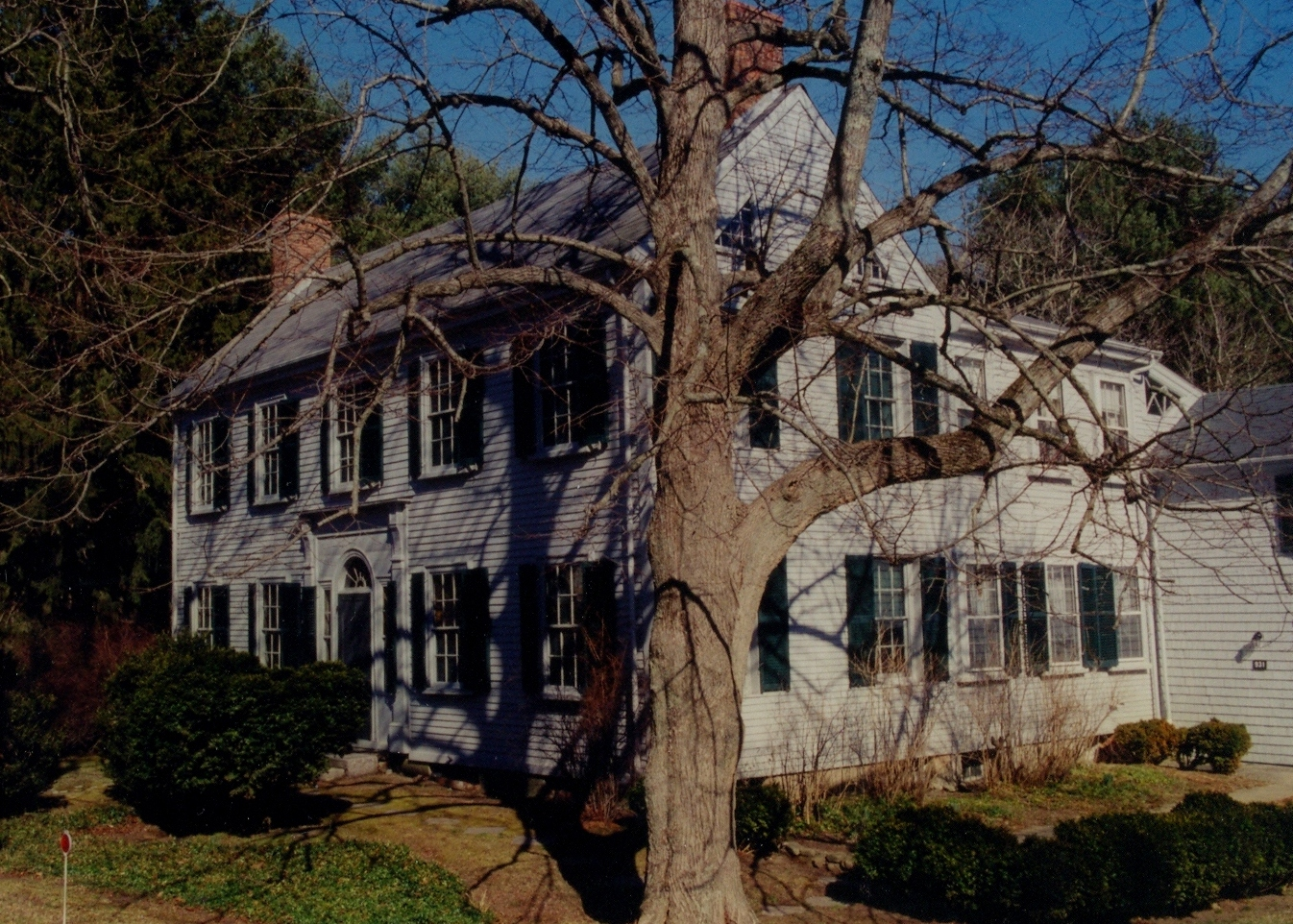

- Location within Massachusetts Location within the United States
- Nearest city: 931 Tremont Street, Duxbury, Massachusetts
- Coordinates: 42°2′16″N 70°41′21″W
- Built: 1807
- Architectural style: Federal
- NRHP reference No.: 78001403
- Added to NRHP: February 8, 1978

The Capt. Gershom Bradford House is an historic house in Duxbury, Massachusetts. The two-story wood-frame house was built in 1807 by Captain Gershom Bradford, who lived there with his family, included his daughter Charlotte Bradford, a nurse in the American Civil War. The main block has a side-gable roof, and is five bays wide and two deep. A two-story ell attached to the right rear connects the house to another addition, a replacement for a barn torn down c. 1900. The house is now owned and operated by the Duxbury Rural and Historical Society as a historic house museum, and has been decorated with original Bradford family furnishings to appear as it did during the 1840s.

The house was listed on the National Register of Historic Places in 1978.

== See also ==
- National Register of Historic Places listings in Plymouth County, Massachusetts
