= King Caesar House =

Historic house in Massachusetts, United States

- U.S. National Register of Historic Places
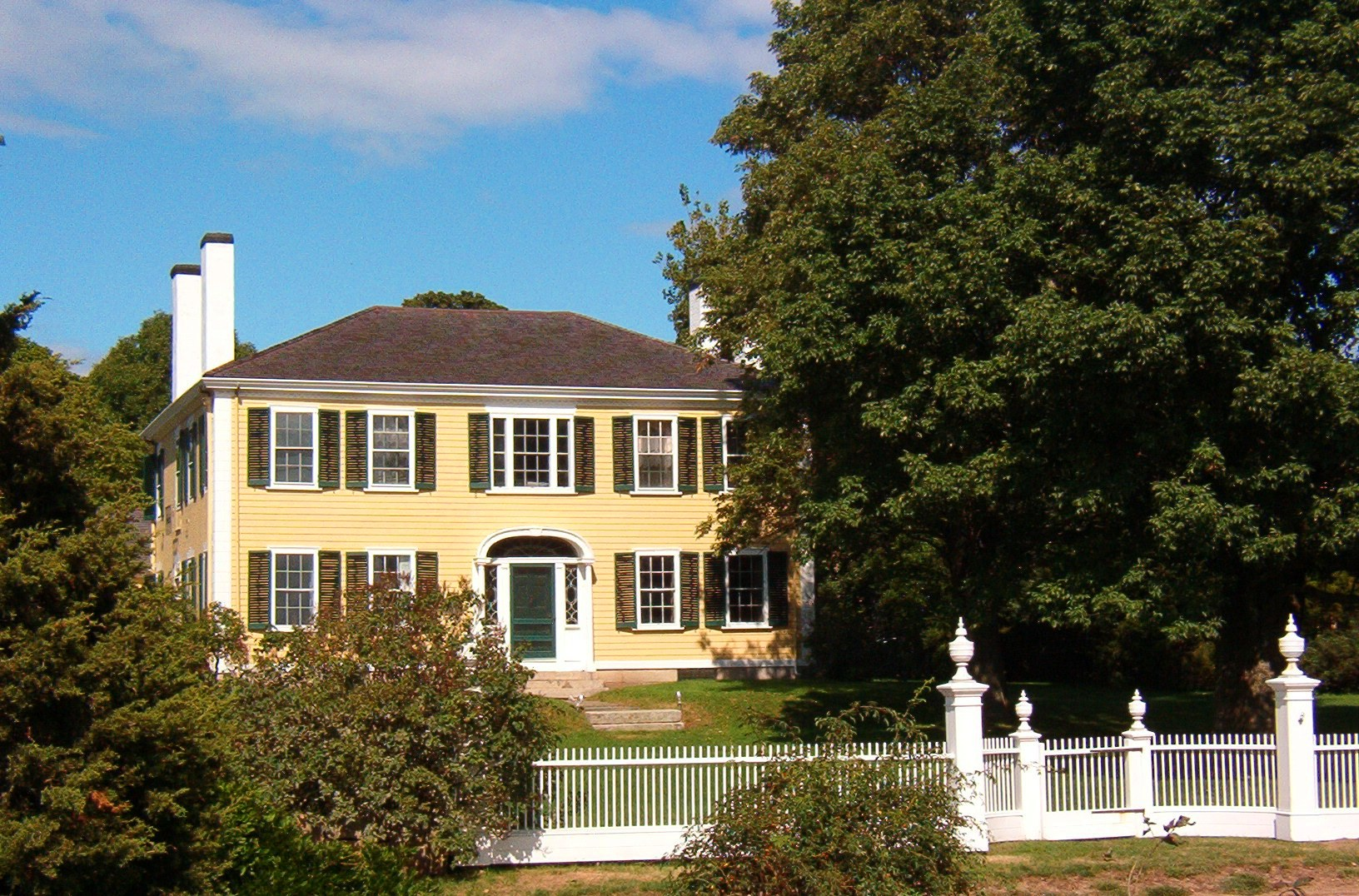

- Location within Massachusetts
- Location: Duxbury, Massachusetts
- Coordinates: 42°2′42.65″N 70°39′52.28″W
- Built: 1809
- Architectural style: Federal
- NRHP reference No.: 78000477
- Added to NRHP: March 29, 1978

The King Caesar House is a historic house located at 120 King Caesar Road, Duxbury, Massachusetts. It is operated as a non-profit museum by the Duxbury Rural and Historical Society.

The Federal style house, completed in 1809, was built for Ezra Weston II (1772–1842) and his wife, Jerusha Bradford Weston (1770–1833). Like his father, Weston was known as "King Caesar" for his success in shipbuilding and shipping. During the 1830s and 1840s, the firm of E. Weston & Sons ran the largest mercantile operation on the South Shore of Massachusetts. In 1841, U.S. Senator Daniel Webster, during a speech in Saratoga Springs, New York, made the claim that Weston was "the largest ship owner, probably, in the United States."

== Historic significance ==
=== Weston family ===
The Weston firm was established by Ezra Weston I (1743–1822) who began building small sloops and schooners on Powder Point in Duxbury in 1764. Ezra I earned the nickname "King Caesar" due to his audacious character and his influence on local politics. After his death, the nickname passed to his son Ezra II who greatly expanded the firms activities, built up a fleet of large sailing vessels, and made the Weston name known across the Atlantic. The firm experienced its heyday in the 1820s and 1830s during which Ezra Weston II presided as sole owner. The vessels built by the Weston firm varied widely in size and configuration, from the 25 ton schooner Sophia, to the ship Hope, launched in 1841 at 880 tons, the largest vessel built in Duxbury and the largest merchant vessel launched in Massachusetts up to that time. Although Ezra Weston II built many schooners for fishing and the coastal trade, the majority of his vessels were large brigs and ships which traded around the world. Over the course of three generations, the Weston firm built or otherwise acquired more than 110 sailing vessels.

From the King Caesar House, Ezra Weston II directed the affairs of his fleet and presided over a ten-acre shipyard, a farm, a ropewalk, a sailcloth mill, and a large work force of sailors, carpenters and laborers. After the death of Ezra Weston II in 1842, his three sons inherited the firm and continued to operate it until 1857. The firm's activities declined sharply after his death, however, and his sons evidently did not possess the same talent for business as "King Caesar."

The King Caesar House passed to the second son, Alden Bradford Weston (1805–1880). After the firm ceased operation, the family fortune was rapidly spent by Alden Weston's two brothers while Alden lived an austere lifestyle in the King Caesar House. Alden Weston married late in life but had no children. He died alone in the King Caesar House in 1880.

The house then fell to King Caesar's grandchildren, Alden Weston's nieces and nephews. Most of them lived in the Boston area and had little desire to keep the Duxbury mansion.

=== Later owners ===
In 1886, Frederick Bradford Knapp (1857–1932) purchased the King Caesar House and the surrounding estate. Knapp, former Superintendent of Buildings at Harvard College, aimed to establish a preparatory school, converting King Caesar's barns into gymnasiums and classrooms. The school was known as the Powder Point School for Boys and quickly earned an excellent reputation. During this period, the King Caesar House served as the Headmaster's House, and Knapp resided there with his family. The Powder Point School for Boys operated successfully for nearly 40 years but eventually merged with Tabor Academy in the 1920s.

Frederick B. Knapp died in 1932. By that time the mansion was in decline. His heirs sold it in 1937 to Dr. Hermon Carey Bumpus, Sr., former director of the American Museum of Natural History in New York, who thoroughly restored the mansion.

In 1945, the King Caesar House was purchased from Dr. Herman Carey Bumpus, Jr. by Miss Alice Moran, a lawyer from New York City who had lived there for years with an Austrian couple, Emil Weber and Elizabeth Weber-Fulop. After the three moved into the house, the servants' quarter in the rear was converted into an artist's studio for Weber-Fulop, who was a painter of high repute. Emil Weber and his wife, Elizabeth, both died in the mid-1960s, leaving Miss Moran alone. In 1966. she offered to sell the house to the Duxbury Rural and Historical Society. After a community fundraising effort, the Duxbury Rural and Historical Society procured the necessary funds to purchase and repair the house. On June 25, 1967, the King Caesar House was dedicated as a museum, "commemorative of the busy shipbuilding days of Duxbury."

== See also ==
- National Register of Historic Places listings in Plymouth County, Massachusetts
