= Capt. Gamaliel Bradford House =

Historic house in Massachusetts, United States

- U.S. National Register of Historic Places
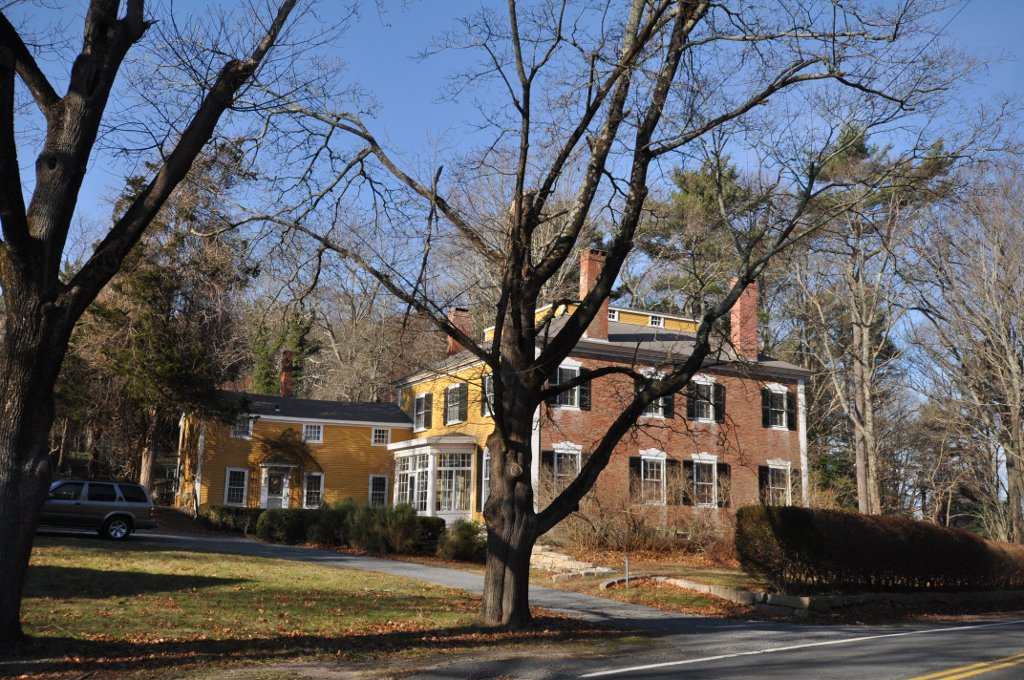

- Location within Massachusetts Location within the United States
- Location: 942 Tremont St., Duxbury, Massachusetts
- Coordinates: 42°2′18″N 70°41′22″W
- Built: 1807
- Architectural style: Federal
- NRHP reference No.: 78001402
- Added to NRHP: February 17, 1978

The Capt. Gamaliel Bradford House is a historic house in Duxbury, Massachusetts. Built in 1807, the house is locally distinctive for its brick side walls and monitor section above the hip roof. It was listed on the National Register of Historic Places in 1978.

== Description and history ==
The Captain Gamaliel Bradford House stands in the central eastern part of Duxbury, on the west side of Tremont Street (Massachusetts Route 3A), south of Harrison Street and north of Duxbury Town Hall. It is a 2 1/2-story frame structure, roughly square in plan, with a hip roof topped by a square monitor section. It is finished in clapboards, except for the sidewalls, which are brick, and is set with a side facing the street. The main facade, facing north, is three bays wide, with a center entrance sheltered by a Doric porch. A similar but simpler entry is located on the south-facing rear facade. The interior of the house follows a typical central hall plan, and retains original period wood paneling. A two-story addition projects west of the main block, behind the rear entry. The property also includes a 19th-century barn and a small cottage, built about 1840 out of materials salvaged from a nearby church.

The house was built in 1807 for Gamaliel Bradford, member of a prominent local family. A ship's captain, he served in the Continental Army during the American Revolutionary War, and later served as a trustee of the Massachusetts Historical Society. The United States Navy destroyer USS Bradford is named in his honor.

== See also ==
- National Register of Historic Places listings in Plymouth County, Massachusetts
