= South Duxbury, Massachusetts =

- Census-designated place
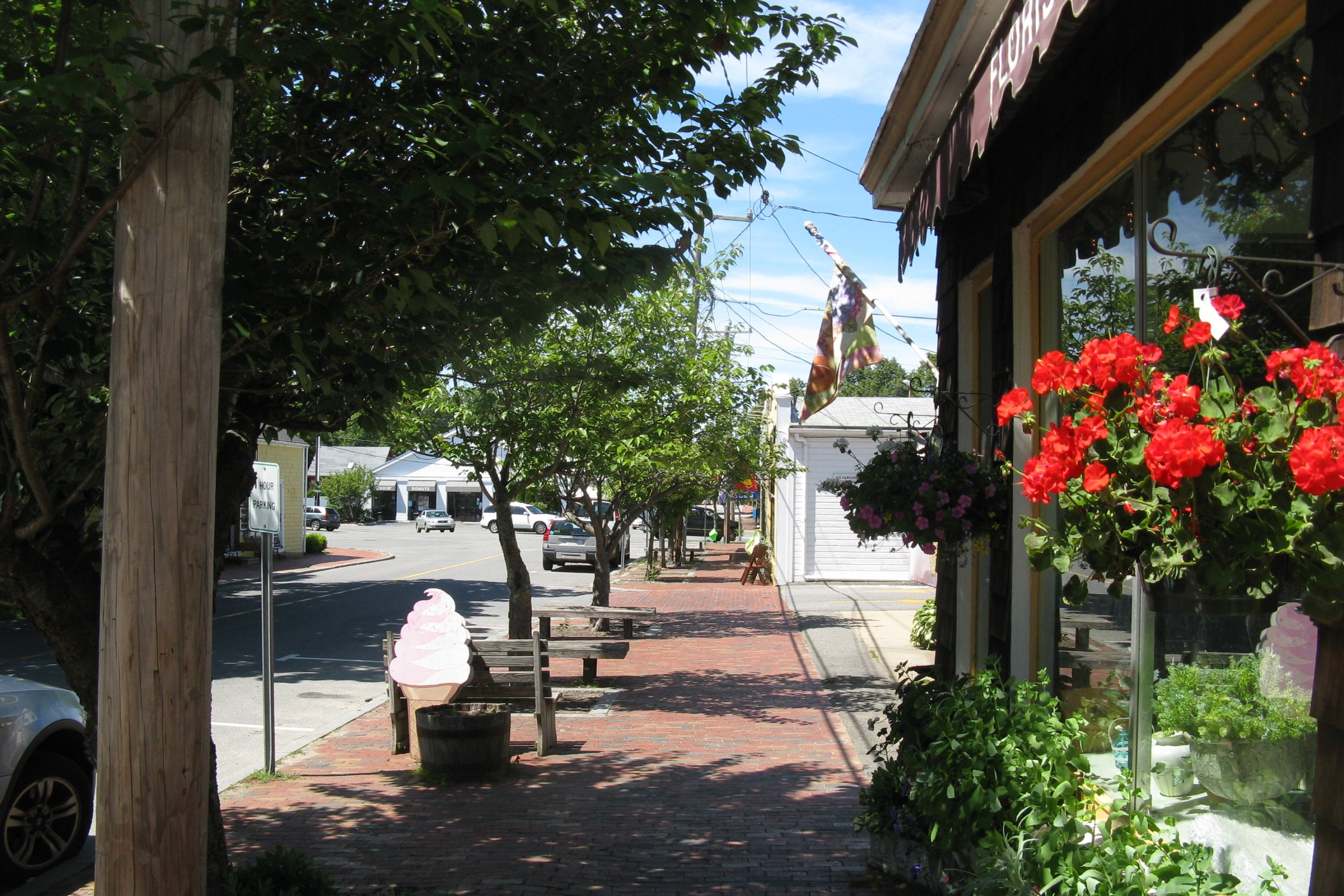
- Looking north on Standish Street

- Location in Plymouth County in Massachusetts
- Coordinates: 42°1′13″N 70°41′43″W
- Country: United States
- State: Massachusetts
- County: Plymouth

Area
  - Total: 4.41 sq mi (11.42 km^{2})
  - Land: 2.93 sq mi (7.60 km^{2})
  - Water: 1.47 sq mi (3.82 km^{2})
- Elevation: 52 ft (16 m)

Population (2020)
  - Total: 3,463
  - Density: 1,179.8/sq mi (455.51/km^{2})
- Time zone: UTC-5 (Eastern (EST))
  - Summer (DST): UTC-4 (EDT)
- ZIP Code: 02332 (Duxbury)
- FIPS code: 25-63690
- GNIS feature ID: 0615382

South Duxbury is a census-designated place (CDP) in the town of Duxbury in Plymouth County, Massachusetts, United States. As of the 2020 census, South Duxbury had a population of 3,463.

== Geography ==
South Duxbury is located at 42°1′13″N 70°41′43″W (42.020223, -70.695338).

According to the United States Census Bureau, the CDP has a total area of 11.5 km^{2} (4.4 mi^{2}), of which 7.7 km^{2} (3.0 mi^{2}) is land and 3.8 km^{2} (1.5 mi^{2}) (32.88%) is water.

== Demographics ==
Historical population
Census	Pop.	Note	%±
2020	3,463		—
U.S. Decennial Census

=== 2020 census ===
As of the 2020 census, South Duxbury had a population of 3,463. The median age was 47.4 years. 23.6% of residents were under the age of 18 and 21.4% of residents were 65 years of age or older. For every 100 females there were 94.8 males, and for every 100 females age 18 and over there were 91.4 males age 18 and over.

100.0% of residents lived in urban areas, while 0.0% lived in rural areas.

There were 1,235 households in South Duxbury, of which 34.1% had children under the age of 18 living in them. Of all households, 66.8% were married-couple households, 9.7% were households with a male householder and no spouse or partner present, and 19.9% were households with a female householder and no spouse or partner present. About 18.2% of all households were made up of individuals and 13.2% had someone living alone who was 65 years of age or older.

There were 1,359 housing units, of which 9.1% were vacant. The homeowner vacancy rate was 0.1% and the rental vacancy rate was 3.2%.

Racial composition as of the 2020 census
Race	Number	Percent
White	3,211	92.7%
Black or African American	12	0.3%
American Indian and Alaska Native	0	0.0%
Asian	36	1.0%
Native Hawaiian and Other Pacific Islander	0	0.0%
Some other race	24	0.7%
Two or more races	180	5.2%
Hispanic or Latino (of any race)	90	2.6%

=== 2000 census ===
As of the census of 2000, there were 3,062 people, 1,099 households, and 864 families residing in the CDP. The population density was 396.7/km^{2} (1,027.0/mi^{2}). There were 1,226 housing units at an average density of 158.8/km^{2} (411.2/mi^{2}). The racial makeup of the CDP was 97.98% White, 0.26% African American, 0.23% Native American, 0.65% Asian, 0.07% from other races, and 0.82% from two or more races. Hispanic or Latino of any race were 0.78% of the population.

There were 1,099 households, out of which 41.9% had children under the age of 18 living with them, 69.9% were married couples living together, 6.4% had a female householder with no husband present, and 21.3% were non-families. 18.6% of all households were made up of individuals, and 10.7% had someone living alone who was 65 years of age or older. The average household size was 2.79 and the average family size was 3.20.

In the CDP, the population was spread out, with 30.4% under the age of 18, 3.6% from 18 to 24, 24.4% from 25 to 44, 28.8% from 45 to 64, and 12.8% who were 65 years of age or older. The median age was 40 years. For every 100 females, there were 95.5 males. For every 100 females age 18 and over, there were 89.0 males.

The median income for a household in the CDP was $96,929, and the median income for a family was $107,094. Males had a median income of $93,137 versus $45,109 for females. The per capita income for the CDP was $42,108.

== Halls Corner ==
South Duxbury is an area in the town of Duxbury, which includes Halls Corner, a small shopping district. Halls Corner consists of five streets (Standish Street, Bay Road, Washington Street, Depot Street, and Chestnut Street) coming together into a roundabout. Those streets contain several stores, such as grocery, clothing, gas, pharmacy, banks, eatery, consignment, flower, hair and nail salons, ice cream, wine and spirits, dentist, bakery, the South Duxbury Post Office, and many more. In previous years there was a train line from the Old Colony Railroad through South Duxbury, but it closed in the late 1930s. The site is now the Duxbury Clipper, a local newspaper.

The SAIL Line (Seaside Area Inter-town Link) bus, operated by GATRA (Greater Attleboro Taunton Regional Transit Authority), runs through Halls Corner, stopping at the Depot Plaza.
