= Ezra Weston II =

Shipbuilder and merchant

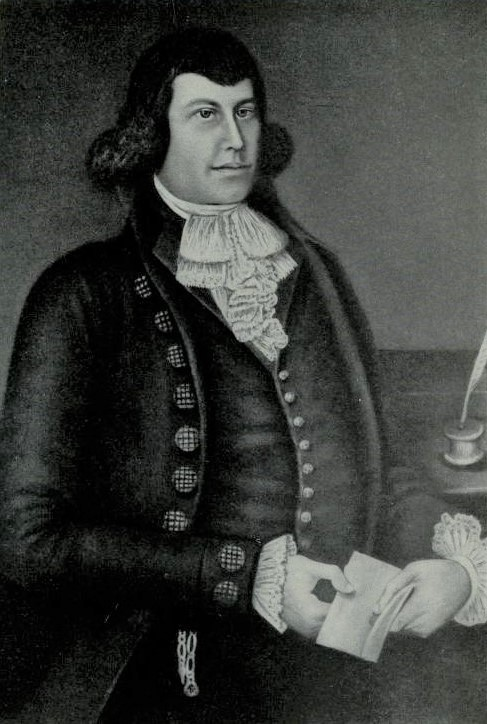
- Born: November 30, 1772; Duxbury, Massachusetts, British America
- Died: August 15, 1842 (aged 69); Duxbury, Massachusetts, U.S.
- Occupations: Shipbuilder and merchant
- Spouse: Jerusha Bradford Weston
- Parent(s): Ezra Weston I Salumith Wadsworth

Ezra Weston II (November 30, 1772 – August 15, 1842), also known as King Caesar, was a shipbuilder and merchant who operated a large maritime industry based in Duxbury and Boston, Massachusetts. His father, Ezra Weston I, began small scale shipbuilding operations in Duxbury in 1763 and eventually came to be known as "King Caesar" for his success in business. Ezra Weston II, his only son, inherited the nickname when Ezra I died in 1822.

Weston initially served as a clerk in his father's firm and was made a partner in 1798. When his father died, Ezra Weston II became sole owner of the firm and continued to increase its scope of shipbuilding and international trade. In 1841, Weston launched his largest vessel, the Ship Hope, at the time the largest merchant vessel in New England. U.S. Senator Daniel Webster, during a speech in Saratoga Springs, New York, made the claim that Weston was "the largest ship owner, probably, in the United States." In the same year, an agent of the insurance firm Lloyd's of London made the same assertion. Although these claims are difficult to support, evidence shows that the Weston firm was the largest mercantile operation on the South Shore of Massachusetts in the early 19th century and one of the largest in New England.

From 1809 to his death in 1842, Weston resided in a Federal mansion known as the King Caesar House, which still stands and is operated as a museum by the Duxbury Rural and Historical Society.

== Early life ==
Weston was the son of Ezra Weston I and Salumith Wadworth Weston. His father began building small vessels on the shore of Powder Point in Duxbury in 1764 and the modest firm, "E. Weston," soon came to encompass merchant trade. Ezra Weston II began working for his father in the 1790s in a clerical capacity, mostly in the counting rooms on his father's Duxbury wharf but also on voyages as supercargo, maintaining records of trading activities abroad. By that time, "E. Weston" was a rapidly expanding maritime operation focused mainly on the Grand Banks fishery and also operated vessels engaged transatlantic trade. Ezra Weston II became a partner in 1798 and the firm was renamed "E. Weston & Son."

In 1793, Weston married Jerusha Bradford, daughter of Col. Gamaliel Bradford and Sarah Alden Bradford, both of Duxbury. Well educated and a lively socialite, Jerusha was a descendant of Plymouth Colony governor William Bradford and other Pilgrim settlers.

In 1803, Ezra I earned the nickname, "King Caesar", partly due to his ambitious character, but also due to his victory in a local political conflict that year involving the construction of the first Bluefish River Bridge in Duxbury. Ezra I succeeded in pushing the expensive project through town meeting, much to the consternation of his opponents. When Ezra I died in 1822, the nickname passed to Ezra Weston II.

== Shipbuilder and merchant ==
Private signal or "fleet flag" of the Weston firm. Coincidentally identical to the flag of the Netherlands.

"E. Weston & Son" became a diverse operation which included a large ropewalk on Weston's property on Powder Point. The 1,000 foot long structure produced cordage for Weston vessels and became a lucrative component of the enterprise as the Westons supplied rigging to all of Duxbury's major shipbuilders as well as shipyards in Boston. In 1812, the Westons built a sailcloth mill in the Millbrook section of Duxbury. They owned a blacksmith shop and tar kiln and employed a large workforce of carpenters, laborers, stevedores and mariners. Thus the Westons were able to supply virtually all their own raw material needed to build sailing vessels. The Westons built numerous smaller vessels, including schooners for fishing and coastal trade. However, Weston's best known vessels were large brigs and ships which traded primarily in the northern Atlantic and Mediterranean.

When his father died in 1822, Ezra II inherited the firm and it returned to its earlier name of "E. Weston." He also inherited his father's nickname of "King Caesar." Ezra II dramatically increased the scope of the firm's activities after his father's death. As evidenced by a sharp increase in shipbuilding and international trade, Ezra II had more ambitious goals, a broader vision for the firm, and the managerial skills to achieve success. Weston transferred much of the firm's administrative and financial activities to Boston over the course of the early 1820s, representing one of the first major operational changes after his father's death. The firm first occupied counting rooms on Boston's Long Wharf. When Commercial Wharf was completed in 1835, it became home to some of Boston's most successful firms. The Weston firm occupied offices on Commercial Wharf from 1835 until the firm closed in 1857. The firm continued to operate a shipyard, mill, ropewalk, and wharf in Duxbury; however, the fleet increasingly used Boston as their home port, particularly as Weston built larger vessels that were unable to return to Duxbury after their launch.

Weston also expanded the firm's operations by hiring a talented, young master carpenter, Samuel Hall, to superintend his shipyard. Hall built some of the finest vessels in the Weston fleet and helped the Weston firm earn its reputation. He oversaw the Weston shipyard for ten years until, in 1837, he established his own shipyard in East Boston. Hall went on to build famous clipper ships including the Surprise.

In 1834, Weston established a large shipyard on the Bluefish River in Duxbury known as the Ten Acre Yard. The largest vessels of the Weston fleet were built there, and it had the capacity for the simultaneous construction of two vessels. When Samuel Hall left Weston's employment, a local master carpenter named Samuel Cushing took over as superintendent of the Ten Acre Yard and built vessels there until the yard ceased operation in 1843.

By the 1830s, the Weston firm was shipping large cargoes of cotton from ports in the southern United States, including New Orleans and Mobile to the textile mills in Liverpool, England. The largest ships of the Weston fleet, launched in the late 1830s and early 1840s, were specifically designed to ship cotton.

Weston died in 1842 and his three sons, Gershom Bradford Weston, Alden Bradford Weston, and Ezra Weston IV, inherited the firm as equal partners. They renamed it "E. Weston & Sons." The brothers ceased shipbuilding immediately but continued to operate the remaining vessels of the Weston fleet in merchant trade for 15 years. As the vessels aged, they gradually sold them off, typically to owners of whaling fleets. Several Weston vessels served for decades as whalers operating out of New Bedford. The firm ceased operation on December 31, 1857.

== Notable vessels built ==
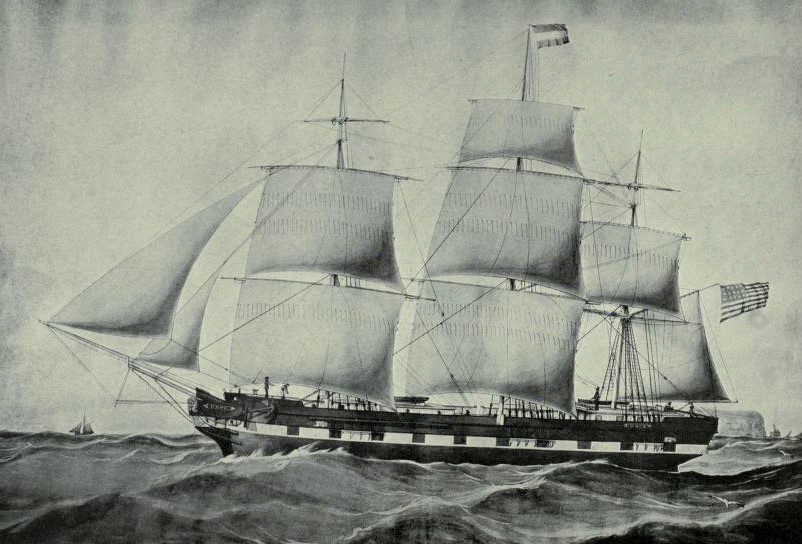
Ship Hope, launched in 1841, was the largest merchant vessel built in New England at that time.

Weston vessels were known for their superior quality and durability. Several earned notoriety while owned by either Weston, or later, under the ownership of other merchants.

While owned by Weston, the brig Smyrna, launched in 1825, was the first United States vessel to enter the Black Sea under a special permit from the Sultan of the Ottoman Empire. The ship Lagoda, launched in 1826 and sold by Weston to a whaling merchant, became one of the most successful in the New Bedford, Massachusetts whaling fleet. A half-scale model of the Lagoda is today featured in the New Bedford Whaling Museum. The brig Messenger, launched in 1834, was also sold to a whaling merchant and, in 1862, became part of the infamous Stone Fleet sunk in Charleston Harbor by the United States Navy in hopes of obstructing the Confederate port during the Civil War. The ship Oneco, Weston's second largest vessel launched in 1839 became the only Weston ship to circumnavigate the globe from 1850 to 1852. The ship Hope, launched in 1841, was at the time the largest merchant vessel built in New England and on her maiden voyage shipped a record-breaking cargo of cotton from New Orleans to Liverpool, England.

During the firm's heyday from the mid-1820s to 1841, Weston typically launched two or three vessels per year. Over the course of three generations, the Weston firm built or purchased approximately 110 sailing vessels.

== King Caesar House ==
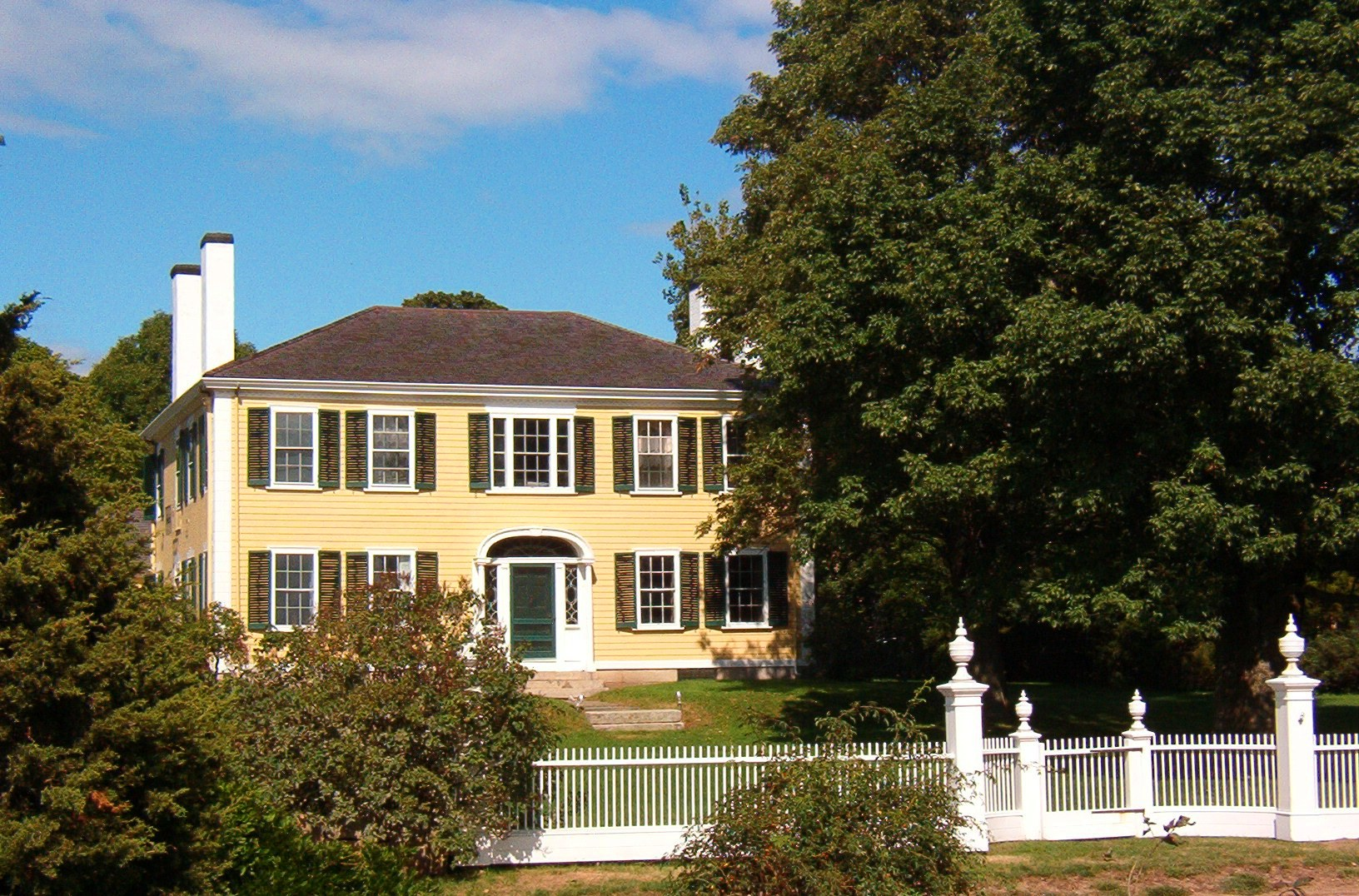
The King Caesar House, built 1809

The Federal style house built for Ezra Weston II and his family was completed in 1809. Several Duxbury shipbuilders built large new homes in the wake of the Embargo Act of 1807 which severely impacted maritime industries in New England and caused widespread unemployment. According to tradition, with shipyards inactive, many ship carpenters sought alternative work and merchants such as Ezra Weston gave them employment in building elegant new houses.

When Weston died, the King Caesar House passed to his son, Alden B. Weston (1805–1880). The Weston family fortune was spent rapidly by Alden's two brothers and he consequently lived frugally. Alden Weston married at age 55 but did not have any children. His wife predeceased him and Alden Weston died alone in the King Caesar House in 1880.

King Caesar's grandchildren, the sons and daughters of Gershom B. Weston, then inherited the house which by that time was in disrepair. They soon sold it to Frederick Bradford Knapp, former Superintendent of Buildings at Harvard College, in 1886. Knapp established the Powder Point School for Boys, a preparatory school, and converted Ezra Weston's farm into athletic fields and the outbuildings into classrooms and gymnasiums. The King Caesar House was designated as the headmaster's house. The Powder Point School for Boys ceased operation in 1926 and the Knapp family sold the property in 1937.

The King Caesar House passed to Dr. Hermon Carey Bumpus, former director of the American Museum of Natural History in New York. Bumpus extensively restored the house which had fallen into some disrepair after the Knapps died. In 1945, Elizabeth Weber-Fulop, an accomplished Austrian painter, purchased the house. Finally, in 1965, the Duxbury Rural and Historical Society purchased the King Caesar House and converted it into a museum dedicated to Duxbury's maritime era. The King Caesar House museum is located at 120 King Caesar Road in Duxbury, Massachusetts.

== Marriage and family ==
Ezra and Jerusha Bradford Weston had six children, only three of whom survived to adulthood. The children were:

1. Maria Weston (1794–1804)
2. Ezra Weston (1796–1805)
3. Gershom Bradford Weston (1799–1869). One of three sons to inherit the firm. At a young age he sailed on his father's ships. At 28 he was elected to the Massachusetts House of Representatives. He served as an unofficial local recruiter for the Union during the American Civil War.
4. Jerusha Bradford Weston (1802–1804)
5. Alden Bradford Weston (1805–1880). One of three sons to inherit the firm. Of the three, Alden was the most heavily involved in managing the fleet with his father. Beginning in 1825, Alden was made head clerk of the Boston counting rooms and had charge of much of the firm's record-keeping from that time forward. Alden inherited the King Caesar House.
6. Ezra Weston (1809–1852). One of the three sons to inherit the firm. Served as City Marshal of Boston 1837–1839. Interested in horticulture and music.
