= Duxbury (disambiguation) =

Duxbury is a coastal town in Plymouth County, Massachusetts, United States; located near Boston.

Duxbury may also refer to:

== Places ==
- Duxbury, Lancashire, a former parish in England, the location of Duxbury Hall
- Navy Nagar or Duxbury, a cantonment area in the Colaba area of Mumbai, India
- Duxbury (CDP), Massachusetts, a census-designated place in Duxbury, Massachusetts, U.S.
- Duxbury, Minnesota, an unincorporated community in east–central Minnesota, U.S.
- Duxbury, Vermont, a town located in central Vermont, U.S.

== Other uses ==
- Duxbury (surname)
- USS Duxbury Bay (AVP-38), a United States Navy seaplane tender in commission from 1944 to 1966

== See also ==
- Duxbury Bay (Massachusetts), a bay on the coast of Massachusetts
- Duxbury Beach, a beach in Duxbury, Massachusetts
- South Duxbury, Massachusetts, a census-designated place (CDP) in Duxbury, Massachusetts
