= Warren Cove (Massachusetts) =

Coordinates: 41°56′45″N 70°37′34″W

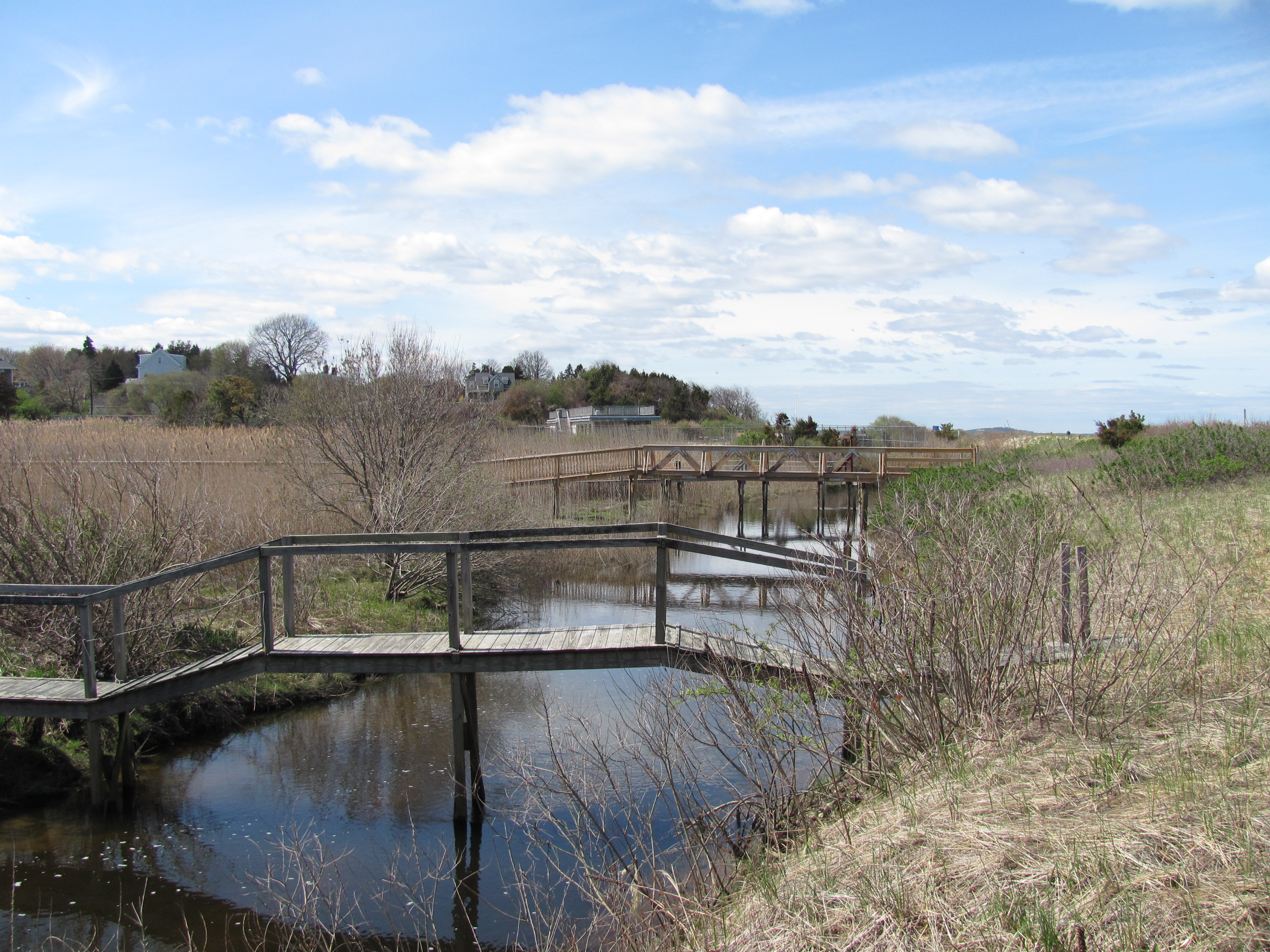
Footbridges over the Eel River in Warren Cove

Warren Cove is an exclusive oceanfront residential area Plymouth Bay in Plymouth, Massachusetts. Plymouth Beach and Rocky Point surround the southern edge of the cove. Stately homes along Warren Avenue and Rocky Hill Road have a commanding view of Plymouth Long Beach, Gurnet Light, Duxbury Bay, "Bug Light", Saquish, and Kingston Shores.

Panoramic view
