= Pine Hills (Massachusetts) =

Pine Hills is a sparsely populated hilly region located in Plymouth, Massachusetts, in the United States. It is a large, mostly undeveloped hilly and forested area lying south of Plymouth Beach and Chiltonville, north of Manomet, and east of Route 3, where the southern portion of the region can be accessed from Exit 3 (which is signed as of 1 October 2007), and the northern portion can be accessed from Exit 4. The area rises from Plymouth Bay at Rocky Point, which is considered to be located in the foothills of the region, and runs southwest. Route 3A winds through the heart of the Pine Hills. The region consists of the Rocky Point neighborhood in the north and The Pinehills, a new residential and commercial development in the extreme southern part of the area.

== Manomet Hill ==
Manomet Hill is the highest peak in the Pine Hills 41°55′38″N 70°35′30″W. At 395 feet (120 m) above sea level, it is the highest point in Plymouth County. Route 3A runs close to the peak. As the peak is on private property, it is closed to the public.

== Cleft Rock ==
Cleft Rock is a rock formation located in the Pine Hills, known for the unique cleft that runs through its center. The rock formation is said to have been used as a lookout spot by the Native Americans, and it offers a panoramic view of Cape Cod Bay on a clear day. It is located in an 8.7-acre (35,000 m^{2}) park on Route 3A.

== See also ==
- Plymouth, Massachusetts
- Neighborhoods in Plymouth, Massachusetts
