= Duxbury Pier Light =

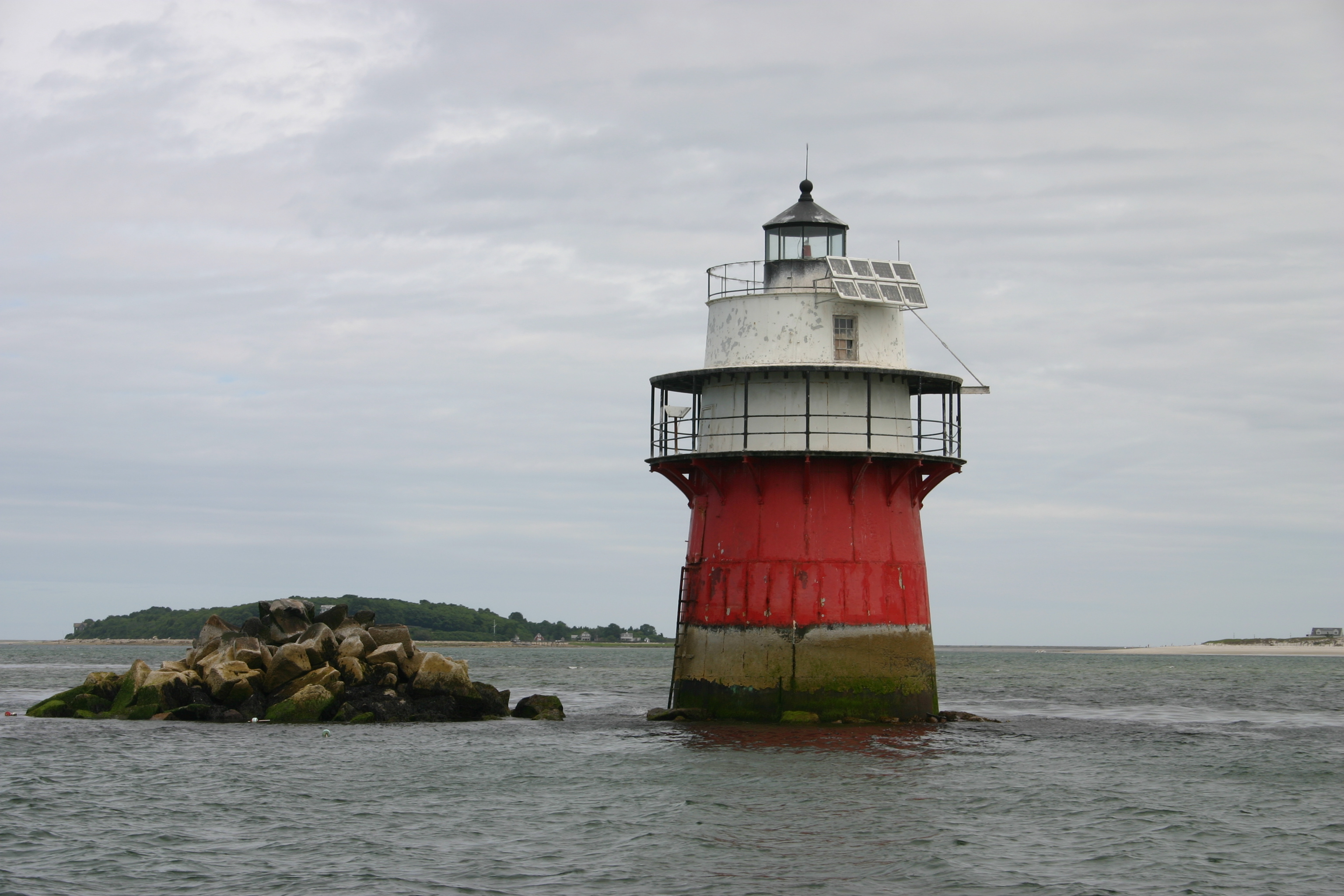
- Duxbury Pier lighthouse in Plymouth Harbor
- Location: Plymouth Harbor, Plymouth, Massachusetts
- Coordinates: 41°59′14.73″N 70°38′54.77″W

Tower
- Foundation: Caisson
- Construction: Cast iron
- Automated: 1964
- Height: 14 m (46 ft)
- Shape: conical "Spark Plug"
- Markings: white with brown base
- Heritage: National Register of Historic Places listed place

Light
- First lit: 1871
- Focal height: 35 feet (11 m)
- Lens: Fourth order Fresnel lens
- Range: 6 nautical miles (11 km; 6.9 mi)
- Characteristic: Flashing red twice every 5s, Higher intensity beam seaward. HORN: 1 blast ev 15s (2s bl).
- Duxbury Pier Light
- U.S. National Register of Historic Places
- MPS: Lighthouses of Massachusetts TR
- NRHP reference No.: 14000287
- Added to NRHP: June 4, 2014

Duxbury Pier lighthouse also called Duxbury Light (nicknamed the "Bug Light") is a lighthouse located in Plymouth Harbor, Massachusetts. Duxbury Pier Light was built in 1871 on the north side of the main channel in Plymouth Harbor to mark the dangerous shoal off Saquish Head. The unusual coffeepot-shaped lighthouse is locally known as "Bug Light" or simply "The Bug." It was the first so-called sparkplug lighthouse in the United States. Application was made to list the lighthouse on the National Register of Historic Places in 2014.

== Description ==
The lighthouse stands 47 feet (14 m) tall, and contains three levels that were used as living quarters and a watch room. The lantern room held a fourth order Fresnel lens, first lighted on September 15, 1871. To protect the structure, 100 tons of stones were placed around the base in 1886. A 700-US-gallon (2,600 L; 580 imp gal) water cistern was added in 1900. The lighthouse was automated in 1964 and the keepers were removed. A modern optic replaced the Fresnel lens. Over the next two decades the light fell victim to much vandalism and seabirds made themselves a home in the interior. It was refurbished in the 1980s and in 2001, and continues to serve as an aid to navigation.

== History ==
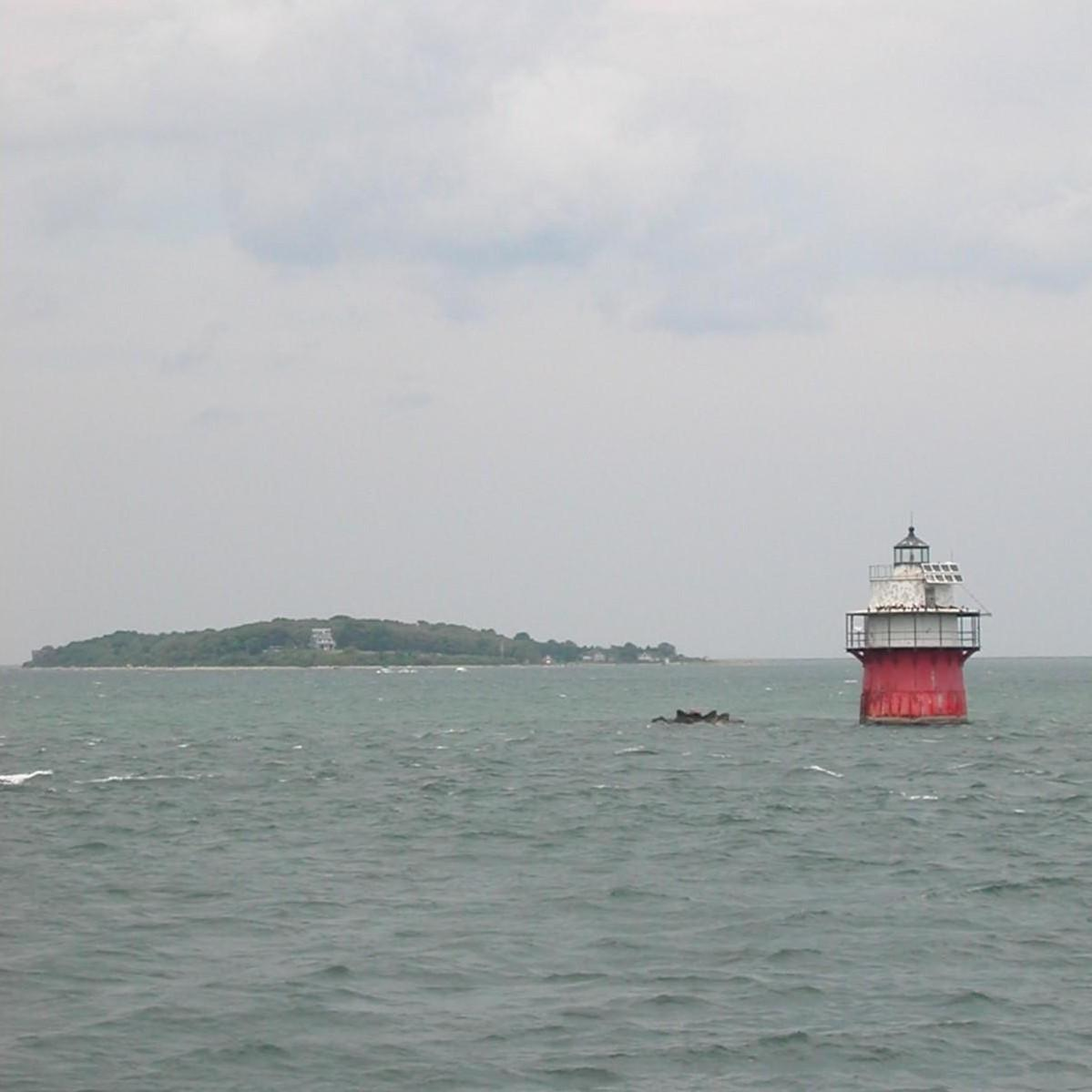
The Duxbury Pier Light with Clark's Island in the distance

Bug Light survived the Hurricane of 1944 when 30-foot (9.1 m) waves battered the isolated station. Heavy seas on the east side destroyed the fog bell mechanism, the lightkeepers’ boat, and its outhouse. In 1983 Duxbury Pier Light was slated by the Coast Guard to be replaced by a fiberglass tower much like the one that had replaced Boston Harbor's old Deer Island Lighthouse. The Coast Guard had estimated that a renovation of the current structure would have cost $250,000. A group of concerned local residents formed Project Bug Light. A five-year lease was granted to the preservation committee. The Coast Guard sandblasted and painted the structure and did some repair work in 1983; the work was completed in 1985. The Coast Guard spent $100,000 to refurbish the lower half of the lighthouse. Project Bug Light raised $20,000 from local businesses, as well as sales of T-shirts and bumper stickers, a fashion show, baseball games, and raffling a painting. They used this money to restore the upper parts and the interior, including the rebuilding of the roof and the catwalk. At the same time solar power replaced the older battery system. The fog signal was also converted to solar power. In the late 1980s, vandals broke into the lantern room, leaving it susceptible to leaks. The weather deteriorated the wood interior so much that all the wood had to be removed, leaving bare iron walls. After a few years Project Bug Light virtually dissolved as an organization, and the five-year lease expired. In 1993, the Coast Guard again talked of replacing the lighthouse with a fiberglass pole, or at least removing the lantern room. This time, Dr. Don Muirhead of Duxbury, an avid sailor, spearheaded a new preservation effort. The Coast Guard again refurbished the lighthouse in 1996. The volunteers of Project Bug Light continue to do maintenance at the light and have raised more than $80,000 toward the continued preservation of "The Bug." To quote volunteer Edwin Heap, "It's an ugly old historical thing, but we're glad it's been saved."

Excerpted from New England Lighthouses: A Virtual Guide by Jeremy D'Entremont

== See also ==
- Lighthouses in the United States
- Plymouth, Massachusetts
- Duxbury (town), Massachusetts
- National Register of Historic Places listings in Plymouth County, Massachusetts
