= Duxbury Bay (Massachusetts) =

Coordinates: 42°00′00″N 70°39′28″W

Duxbury Bay is a bay on the coast of Massachusetts in the United States. The west shore of the bay is the town of Duxbury, Massachusetts; and the bay is formed by a sandbar called The Gurnet extending southeasterly from Marshfield, Massachusetts into Cape Cod Bay. The town of Marshfield was named for the estuarine wetland at the north end of the bay. The bay opens southerly toward Plymouth, Massachusetts between Captains Hill to the west and Saquish Head to the east.

== Navigation ==
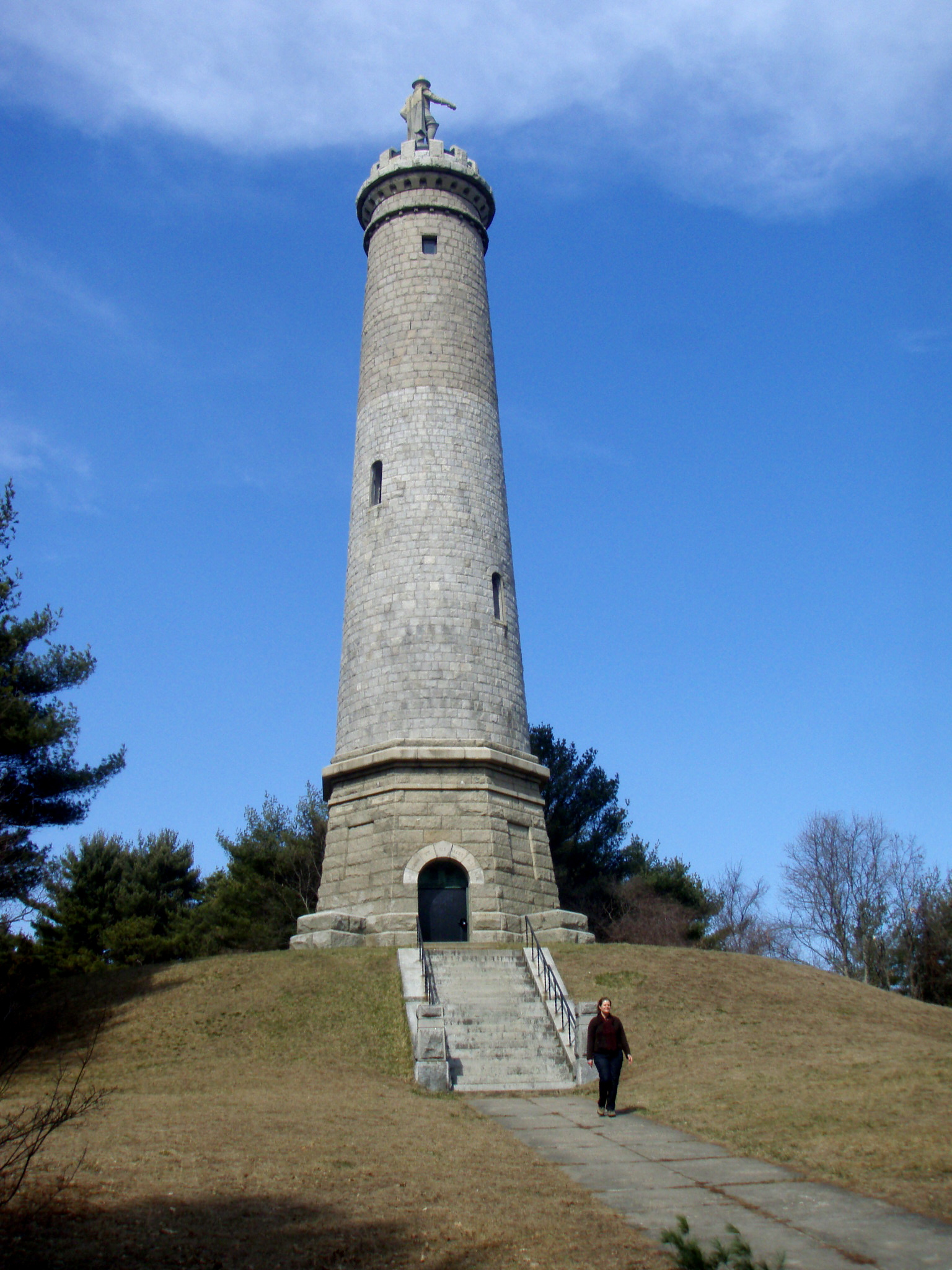
Myles Standish Monument 291 feet (89 m) high atop Captains Hill is a convenient navigation landmark visible from all directions in the southern bay.

The bay is approximately three miles long from north to south with an average width of two miles. The bottom is mostly shallow sand and mud flats exposed at low water with a few winding channels. Several of these channels converge west of Clarks Island to form a small craft anchorage called the Cowyard approximately 200 yards (180 m) wide with a depth of 20–35 feet (6.1–10.7 m). There is 5-foot (1.5 m) clearance under a 25-foot (7.6 m) fixed span in the Powder Point Bridge to access the northern end of the bay.

In 1908 The United States Army Corps of Engineers dredged a 6-foot (1.8 m) channel to the Duxbury wharves. A 21-acre anchorage was dredged to 8 feet (2.4 m) in 1960, and the 1 mile (1.6 km) channel is maintained at that depth and a width of 100 feet (30 m).

== Namesake ==
The United States Navy seaplane tender USS Duxbury Bay, in commission from 1944 to 1966, was named for Duxbury Bay.
