= Myles Standish Monument State Reservation =

Protected area in Massachusetts, US

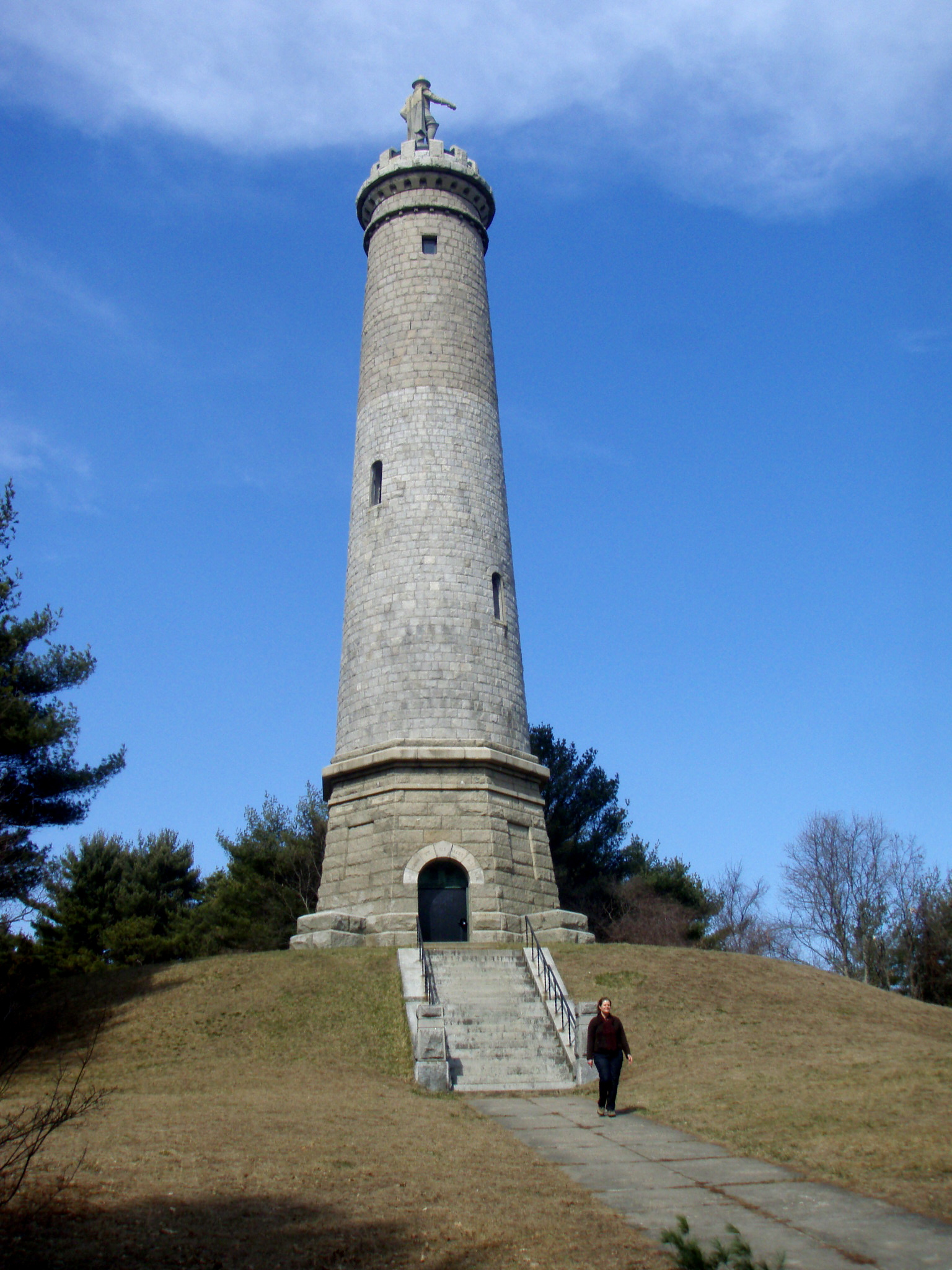
- Myles Standish Monument

- Location within Massachusetts Location within the United States
- Location: Duxbury, Massachusetts, United States
- Coordinates: 42°00′51″N 70°40′58″W
- Area: 30 acres (12 ha)
- Elevation: 174 ft (53 m)
- Established: 1872
- Administrator: Massachusetts Department of Conservation and Recreation
- Website: Official website

Myles Standish Monument State Reservation is a public recreation area and historic preserve in Duxbury, Massachusetts, United States. The focus of the state park is a 116-foot granite shaft topped by a statue of Captain Myles Standish. Standish was military leader of Plymouth Colony. The park is managed by the Massachusetts Department of Conservation and Recreation.

== History ==
A dedication and cornerstone-laying ceremony attended by 10,000 people took place on October 7, 1872. Colonel Newell A. Thompson of the Ancient and Honorable Artillery Company of Massachusetts served as chief marshal of parade from the train station to the monument sight. The corner-stone-laying ceremony included senior leaders of Freemasonry from across Massachusetts. Governor Seth Padelford of Rhode Island attended as special guest. The monument was not completed until 1898. The monument was built on Captain's Hill, the highest point, 200 feet above sea level, on what was once Standish's farm. The monument rises 116 feet from its foundation to a small viewing parapet that offers panoramic views over the original Plymouth Colony. The 14-foot statue that surmounts the tower has Standish gazing eastward across Massachusetts Bay and holding the colony's charter. The Commonwealth of Massachusetts has owned the monument and grounds since 1920. The monument was refurbished in 1988.

== Activities and amenities ==
The tower's 125 steps can be climbed when open, yielding views from the top of 19th-century lighthouses, Duxbury Beach, Plymouth Harbor, and the Blue Hills to the northwest. The park offers walking trails, picnic tables, and seasonal interpretive programs.

Nearby is Myles Standish Burial Ground, the final resting place for the Captain, with a second, smaller monument built over his gravesite.
