= Greenwich Bay =

Greenwich Bay may refer to:

Places

- Greenwich Bay (Rhode Island), a bay on the coast of Rhode Island in the United States
- Greenwich Bay, a bay at the mouth of the Yarra River in Newport, Victoria

Ships

- USS Greenwich Bay (AVP-41), a United States Navy seaplane tender in commission from 1945 to 1966
