= Fort Standish =

Fort Standish can refer to:

- Fort Standish (Boston, Massachusetts), a former fort in Boston
- Fort Standish (Plymouth, Massachusetts), a former fort in Plymouth
