= Duxbury Beach =

Beach in Massachusetts, United States

Coordinates: 42°02′30.37″N 70°38′08.13″W

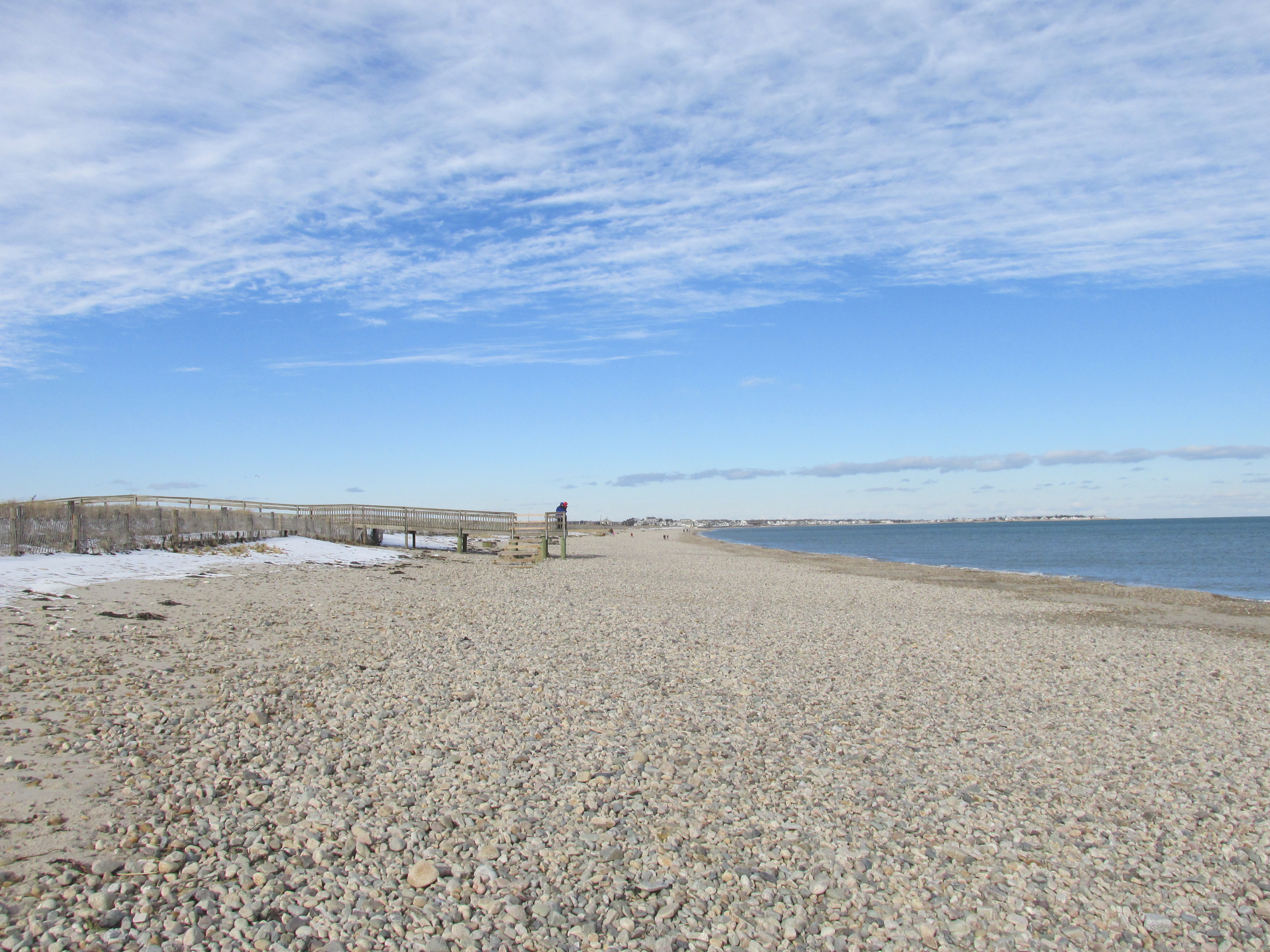
Duxbury Beach

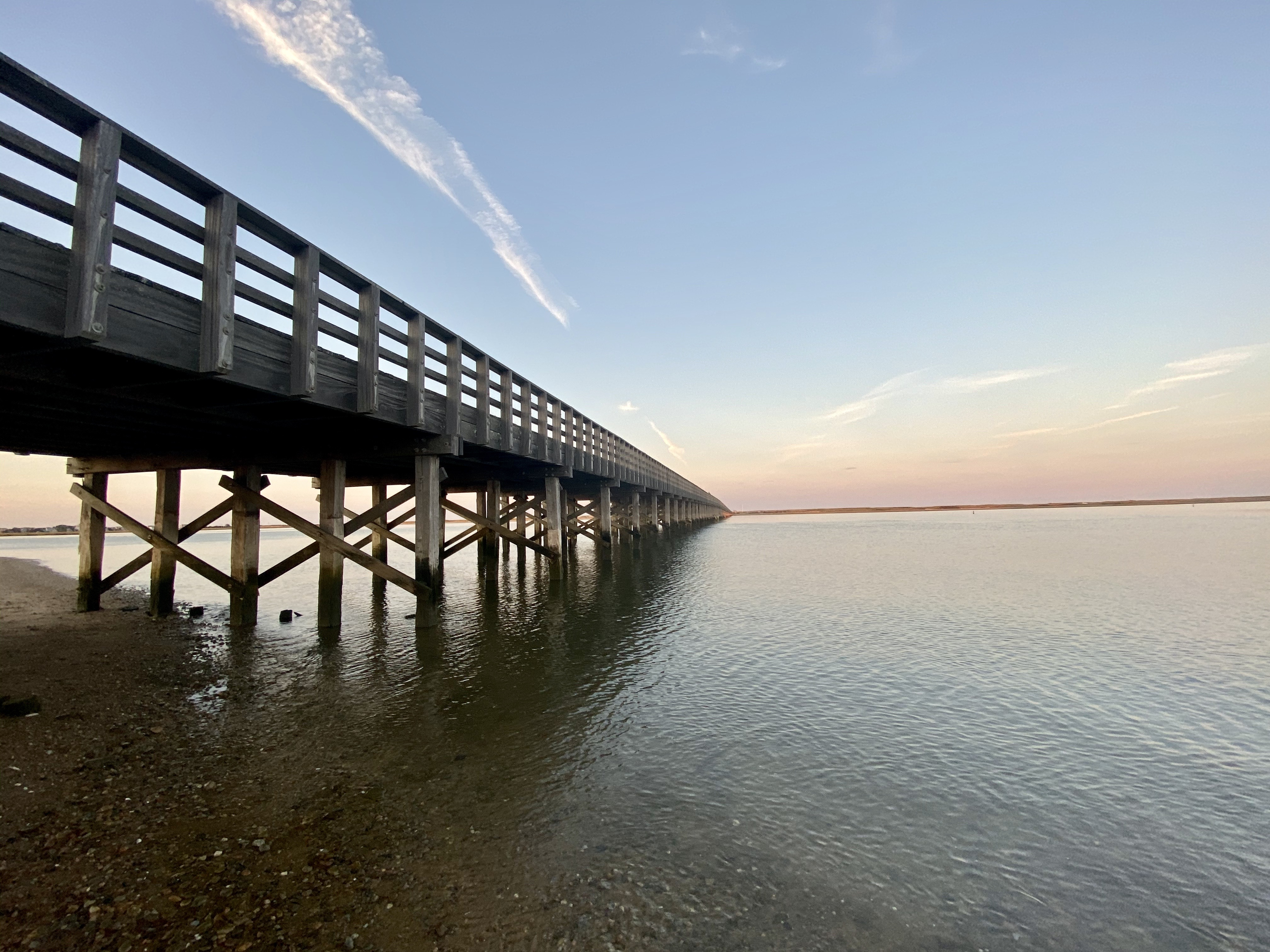
Powder Point Bridge connecting Duxbury Beach with the town of Duxbury. Bridge was in the Guinness Book of World Records for being the oldest and longest wooden bridge in the world, until it was damaged by fire and completely rebuilt in 1986.

Duxbury Beach is a barrier beach in the town of Duxbury, Massachusetts. It is six miles long and is accessed by the Powder Point Bridge from Duxbury, or Gurnet Road from Marshfield. Since 1975, approximately 4.5 miles of the beach is owned by Duxbury Beach Reservation, Inc, which annually leases a substantial portion of the beach—excepting the Duxbury Beach Park area—to the town of Duxbury. Under this arrangement, the town issues beach vehicle permits, provides police protection, and provides conservation officers to patrol the beach in all seasons of the year.

It is 50 yards wide at some points, and is the sole land access to the villages of Saquish and Gurnet Point across the town line in Plymouth, the only land area where the two towns meet. The northern residential end is protected by an Army Corps Of Engineers concrete seawall.

The beach is near Plymouth Light and the remains of the Civil War Fort Andrew and Fort Standish. Fort Andrew was preceded by Gurnet Fort in the Revolutionary War. It is only accessible when the lighthouse has an open house for visitors.

== History ==
An early trans-Atlantic cable came ashore at Rouse's Hummock on July 23, 1869, connecting France with the United States. Among those on the first call were Napoleon III and President James Garfield.

George and Georgianna Wright purchased most of the land of Duxbury Beach in 1885 and constructed cottages on the beach at that time. In 1892, George Wright led the construction of what was known as "Long Bridge" and "Gurnet Bridge," which in its refurbished form remains the only access road from Duxbury to Duxbury Beach. The original bridge was built with oak and pine lumber.

In 1919, George Wright's estate sold their land holdings on Duxbury Beach to the Duxbury Beach Association, a common law trust consisting of Duxbury residents.

Duxbury Beach remained the property of the Duxbury Beach Association from 1919 until 1975. Regular attempts were made during this time period by the Massachusetts State Legislature and the Massachusetts Governor's Office to acquire the beach. Beginning in 1973, the Duxbury Beach Association leased annually the beach to the Town of Duxbury. Ownership of the beach was transferred in 1975 from the Duxbury Beach Association to Duxbury Beach Reservation, Inc., a non-profit organization.

According to Envision Duxbury's Comprehensive Master Plan, released in 2019 and the result of a coordinated planning effort by the Town of Duxbury and the Metropolitan Area Planning Council, 83% of Duxbury residents reported that Duxbury Beach is the town of Duxbury's greatest asset.

== Wildlife and ecosystems ==
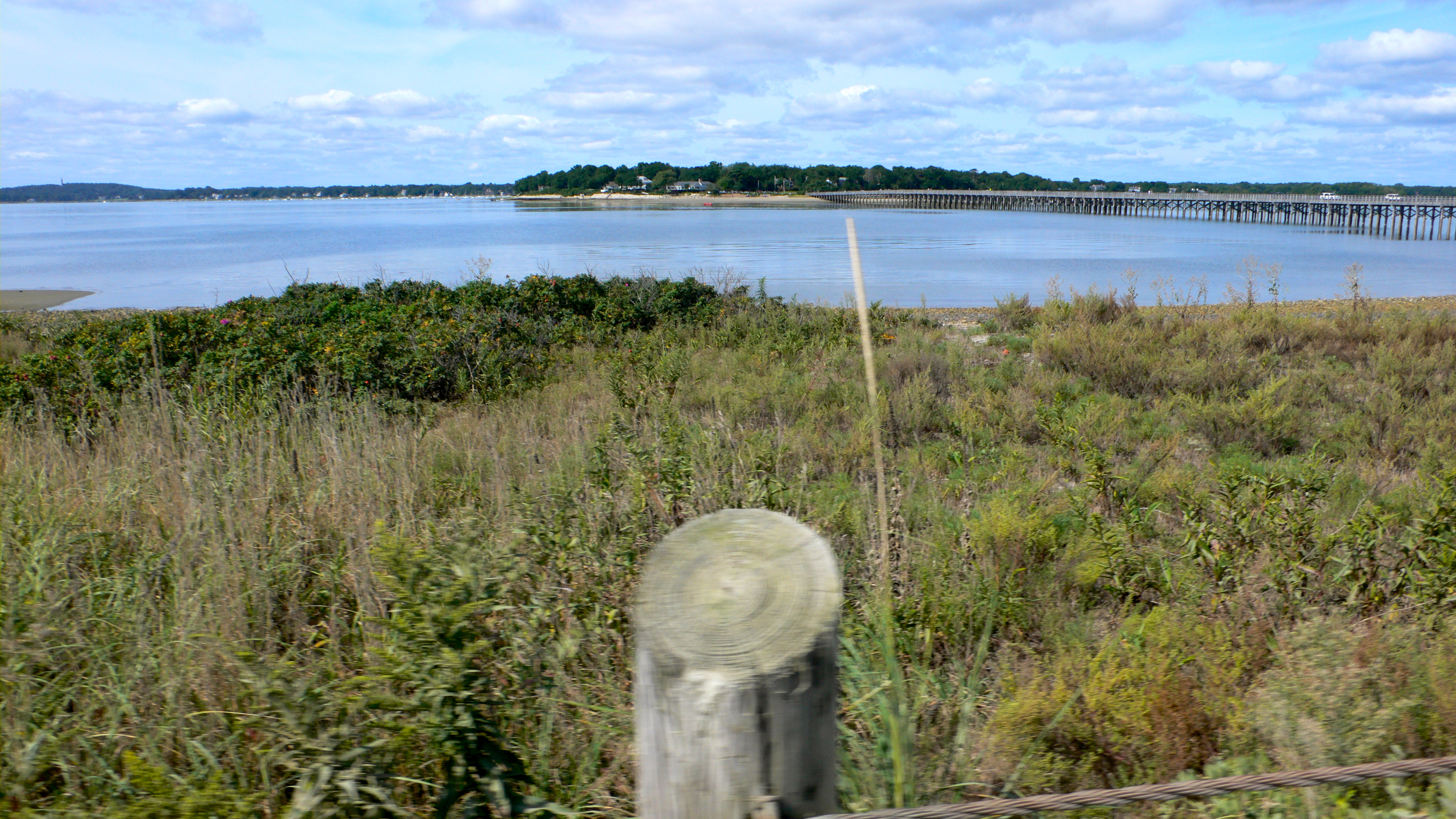
"Protected" side of barrier beach, facing Duxbury Bay

There is a diversity of wildlife that corresponds to the diversity of habitats on the beach, inasmuch as the barrier beach contains a "protected" side facing Duxbury Bay and an "unprotected" side facing the Atlantic Ocean. Duxbury Beach suffers in hurricanes and nor'easters, as in the Blizzard of '78 and the 1991 Perfect Storm.

=== Flora ===
Eelgrass, culms of American beach grass, small woody shrubs, and bayberry fruits are notable on the beach.

Eelgrass appears to be in decline, however. According to a report by the Massachusetts Division of Marine Fisheries, "The embayment has lost as much as 71% of its eelgrass between 1951 and 2014, with many beds shrinking and some disappearing altogether." Likely causes include water quality impairments from runoff and wastewater, and temperature increase due to global heating.

=== Fauna ===
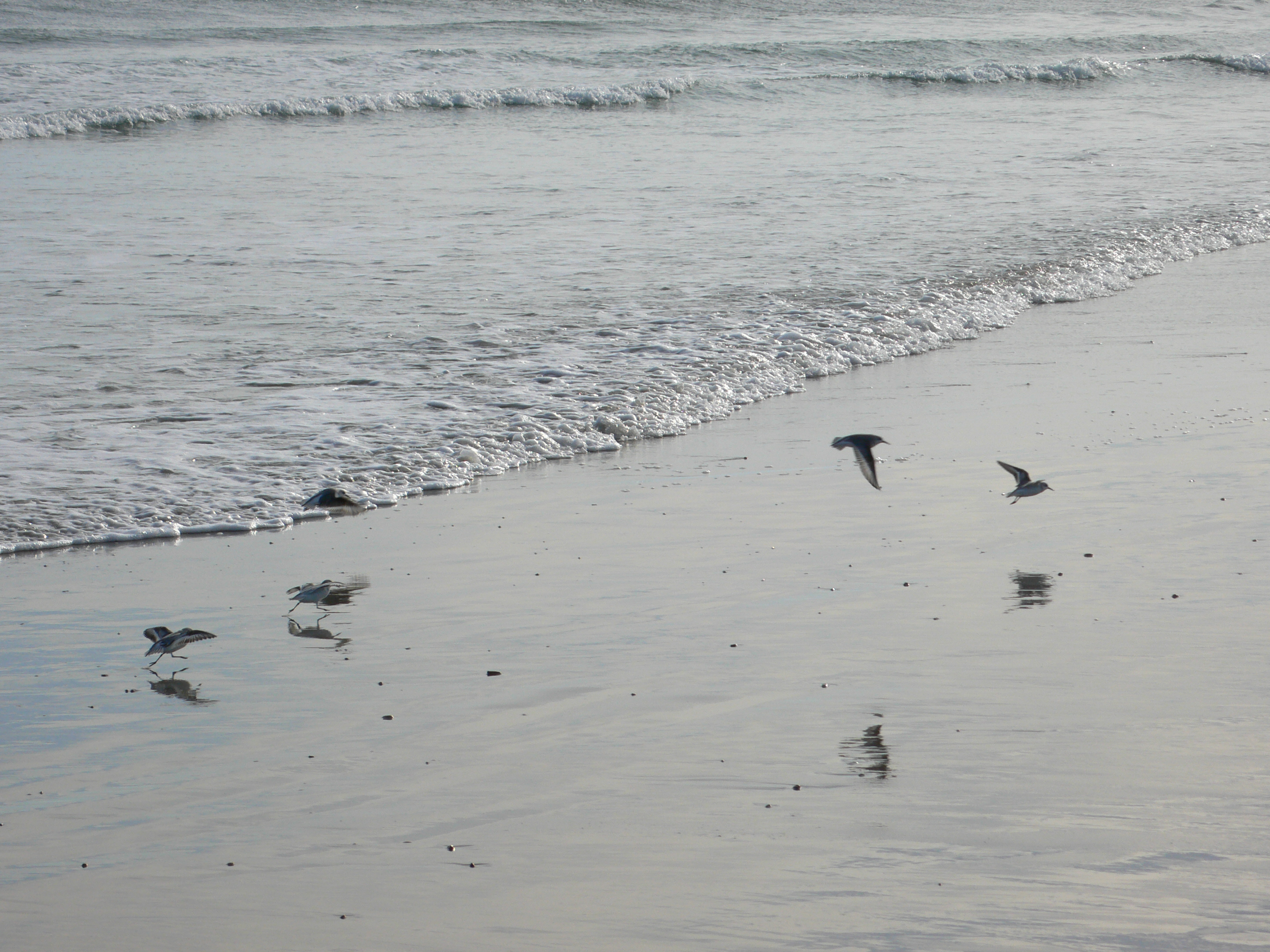
A flock of sanderlings (Calidris alba) take flight

Piping plovers nest on the beach, and their habitats are protected by the Town of Duxbury's conservation officers and Duxbury Beach Reservation, Inc.'s staff. Piping plovers are threatened or endangered depending on the location in North America, but due in part to protected nesting sites like Duxbury Beach, Massachusetts piping plovers have seen a 500% increase in breeding pairs between 1986 and 2023, resulting in 50% of piping plovers on the Atlantic Coast nesting in Massachusetts.

Brant, sanderlings, semipalmated plovers, sandpipers, sea ducks, loons, roseate terns, grebes, cormorants, mergansers, swallows, and various gulls are all present in their proper seasons.

== Powder Point Bridge ==
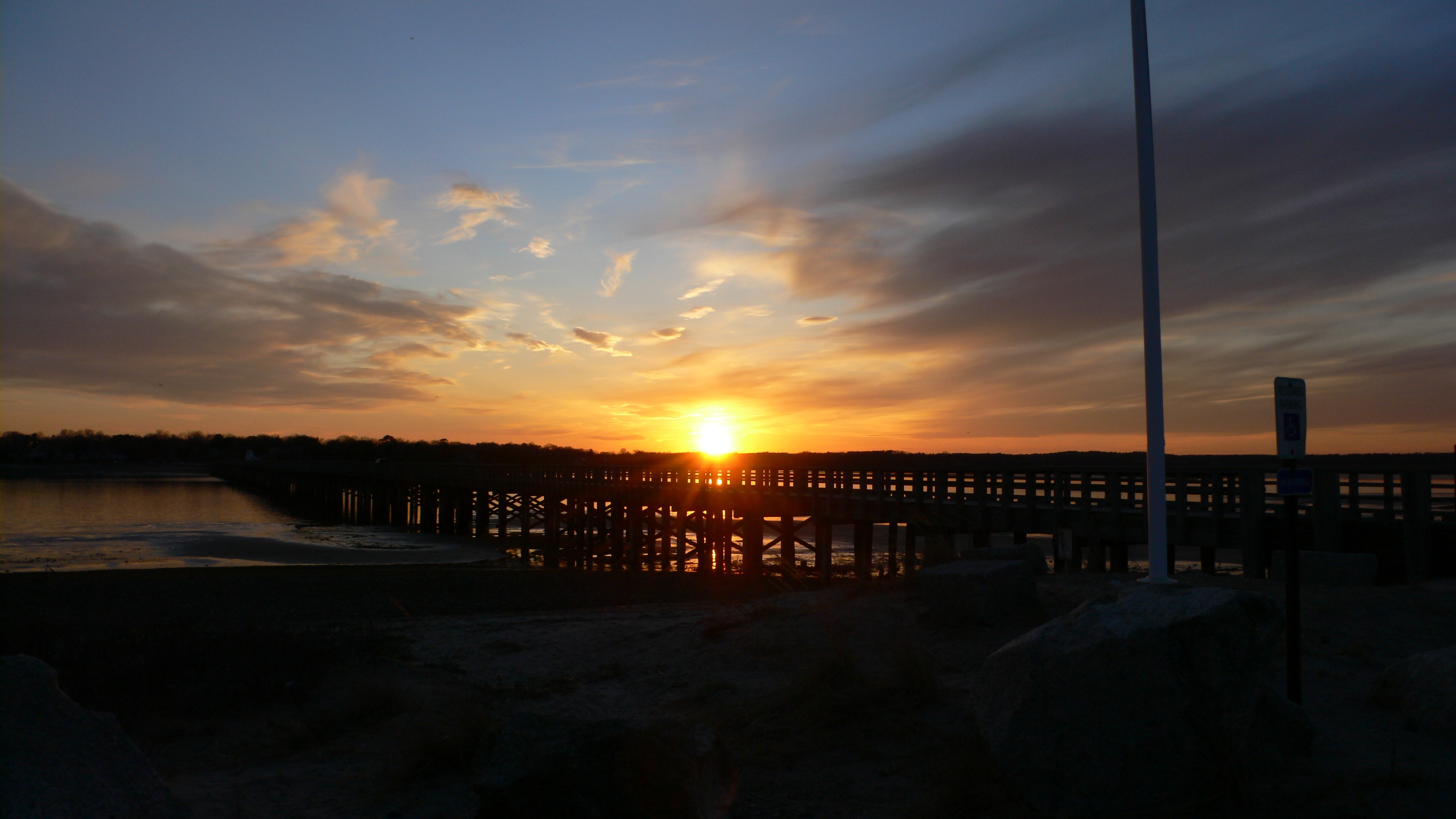
The setting sun peeks over Powder Point Bridge

The Powder Point Bridge is the only access road by which the town of Duxbury is joined to Duxbury Beach.

The current bridge's construction was completed on August 29, 1987. It is built of tropical hardwood from South America and East Asia. Its construction began in 1985, after a fire partially damaged the original bridge on June 11, 1985, and revealed structural issues.

Oldest and longest wooden bridge in North America.

== In the media ==
Film production studios have used Duxbury Beach and the Powder Point Bridge as filming locations. Films that have featured the beach include The Way, Way Back, Altar Rock, and The Finest Hours.
