= USS Valcour =

Tender of the United States Navy

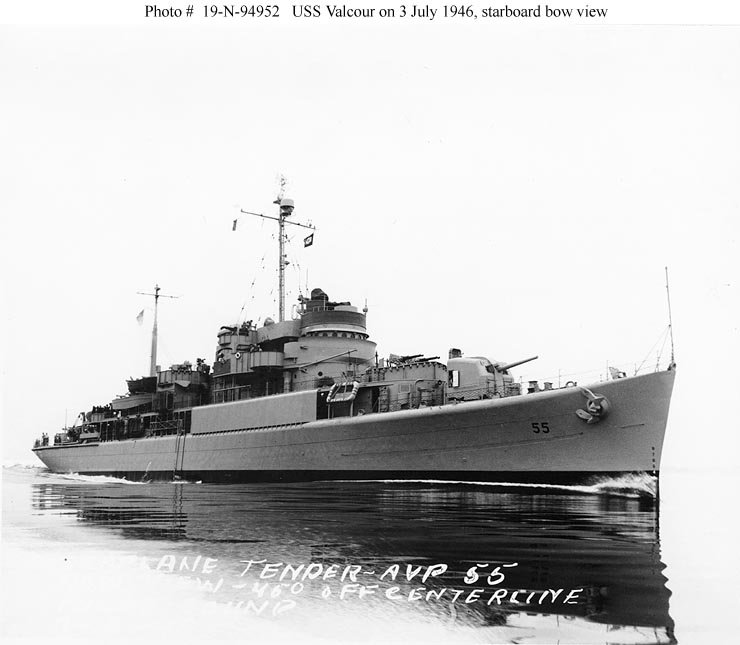
- USS Valcour in Puget Sound on 3 July 1946, two days before commissioning

History

United States
- Name: USS Valcour
- Namesake: Valcour Island in Lake Champlain in New York
- Builder: Lake Washington Shipyard, Houghton, Washington, and Puget Sound Navy Yard, Bremerton, Washington
- Laid down: 21 December 1942
- Launched: 5 June 1943
- Sponsored by: Mrs. H. C. Davis
- Commissioned: 5 July 1946
- Decommissioned: 15 January 1973
- Stricken: 15 January 1973
- Identification: AVP-55
- Fate: Sold for scrap 1 May 1977

General characteristics
- Class & type: Barnegat-class small seaplane tender
- Displacement: 1,766 tons (light); 2,750 tons (full load)
- Length: 311 ft 8 in (95.00 m)
- Beam: 41 ft 1 in (12.52 m)
- Draught: 13 ft 6 in (4.11 m)
- Installed power: 6,000 hp (4,500 kW)
- Propulsion: Diesel engines, two shafts
- Speed: 18.6 knots (34.4 km/h)
- Complement: As seaplane tender: 215 (ship's company); 367 (including aviation unit)
- Sensors & processing systems: Radar, sonar
- Armament: 1 × 5 in (127 mm)/38-caliber dual-purpose gun mount; 1 × quad 40 mm antiaircraft gun mount; 2 × dual 40 mm antiaircraft gun mounts; 8 × 20 mm antiaircraft guns; 2 × depth charge tracks; 2 × antisubmarine rocket launchers
- Aviation facilities: As seaplane tender: Supplies, spare parts, repairs, and berthing for one seaplane squadron; 80,000 US gallons (300,000 L) aviation fuel

USS Valcour (AVP-55), later AGF-1, was a Barnegat-class seaplane tender of the United States Navy, in commission as a seaplane tender from 1946 to 1965 and as a flagship from 1965 to 1973.

== Construction and career ==
Valcour was laid down on 21 December 1942 at Houghton, Washington, by the Lake Washington Shipyard and launched on 5 June 1943, sponsored by Mrs. H. C. Davis, the wife of Captain H. C. Davis, the intelligence officer for the 13th Naval District. Valcour was taken to the Puget Sound Navy Yard at Bremerton, Washington, for completion, but the heavy load of repairs conducted by that shipyard on ships damaged in combat during World War II meant that her construction assumed a lower priority than the repair of combatant vessels. She finally was commissioned at the Puget Sound Naval Shipyard (the former Puget Sound Navy Yard) on 5 July 1946. She was the last of the 35 Barnegat-class ships to commission.

Valcour conducted her shakedown off San Diego, California, between 9 August 1946 and 9 September 1946. Ordered to the United States Atlantic Fleet upon its completion, she transited the Panama Canal between 17 September 1946 and 21 September 1946 and reached the New York Naval Shipyard at Brooklyn, New York, on 26 September 1946 for post-shakedown shipyard availability. Valcour subsequently operated out of Norfolk, Virginia; Quonset Point, Rhode Island; Cristóbal, Panama Canal Zone; and Guantanamo Bay, Cuba, tending seaplanes of the Fleet Air Wings, Atlantic, through mid-1949.

Having received orders designating her as flagship for the Commander, Middle Eastern Force (ComMidEastFor), Valcour departed Norfolk on 29 August 1949, steamed across the Atlantic Ocean and the Mediterranean, stopping at Gibraltar and at Golfe Juan, France, transited the Suez Canal, and arrived at Aden, a British protectorate, on 24 September 1949. Over the months that ensued, Valcour touched at ports on the Indian Ocean and Persian Gulf, including Bahrain; Kuwait; Ras Mishab, Basra; Ras Tanura, Muscat; Bombay, India; Colombo, Ceylon; and Karachi, Pakistan. She returned to Norfolk on 6 March 1950, via Aden; Suez; Piraeus, Greece; Sfax, Tunisia; and Gibraltar. Late in the summer of 1950, after a period of leave, upkeep, and training, she returned to the Middle East for her second tour as ComMidEastFor flagship, which lasted from 5 September 1950 to 15 March 1951.

=== Collision with SS Thomas Tracy ===
On the morning of 14 May 1951, two months after she returned to Norfolk from her second Middle East tour, Valcour headed out to sea for independent ship exercises. While passing the collier SS Thomas Tracy off Cape Henry, Virginia, she suffered a steering casualty and power failure. As she veered sharply across the path of the oncoming collier, Valcour sounded warning signals. Thomas Tracy attempted to make an emergency turn to starboard but her bow soon plowed into Valcour's starboard side, rupturing an aviation gasoline fuel tank. An intense fire soon broke out aboard Valcour and, fed by the high-test aviation gasoline, spread rapidly. To make matters worse, water began flooding into Valcour's ruptured hull. Although fire and rescue parties on board Valcour went to work immediately, the gasoline-fed inferno forced many of Valcour's crew to leap overboard into the swirling currents of Hampton Roads to escape the flames that soon enveloped Valcour's starboard side. The situation at that point looked so severe that Valcour's commanding officer, Captain Eugene Tatom, gave the order to abandon ship.

Thomas Tracy, meanwhile, fared better. Fires aboard Thomas Tracy were confined largely to the forward hold and her crew suffered no injuries. She managed to return to Newport News, Virginia, with her cargo, 10,000 tons of coal, intact. Valcour, on the other hand, became the object of exhaustive salvage operations. Rescue ships, including the submarine rescue ship USS Sunbird and the United States Coast Guard tug USCGC Cherokee sped to the scene of the tragedy. Fire and rescue parties, in some cases forced to use gas masks, succeeded in bringing the blaze under control but not before 11 men had died and 16 more had been injured. Another 25 were listed as "missing", and later were confirmed as dead.

=== Reconstruction ===
Towed back to Norfolk, which she reached at 02:00 hours on 15 May 1951, Valcour underwent an extensive overhaul over the ensuing months. During those repairs, improvements were made in shipboard habitability—air conditioning was installed—and the removal of her single 5-inch (127 mm) 38-caliber forward gun mount to compensate for the increased weight of her other alterations gave the ship a silhouette unique for Barnegat-class ships. The reconstruction task was finally completed on 4 December 1951.

Valcour rotated yearly between the United States and the Middle East from 1952 to 1965, conducting yearly deployments as one of the trio of Barnegat-class ships—along with USS Duxbury Bay and USS Greenwich Bay—that served alternately as flagship for ComMidEastFor. Through 1961, she followed a highly predictable schedule, departing Norfolk each January, relieving Duxbury Bay upon arrival on station, being relieved by Greenwich Bay at the end of her tour, and returning to Norfolk.

There were several highlights to Valcour's lengthy Middle East deployments. In July 1953, during her fourth Middle East cruise, Valcour aided a damaged cargo ship in the Indian Ocean and then escorted her through a violent typhoon to Bombay, India. In May 1955, men from Valcour boarded the blazing and abandoned Italian tanker Argea Prima at the entrance to the Persian Gulf, even though Argea Prima at the time was laden with a cargo of 72,000 barrels (11,400 m^{3}) of crude oil, and proceeded to control the fires. Once Valcour's fire and rescue party had performed their salvage operation, Argea Prima's crew reboarded the ship and she continued her voyage. Later, Valcour received a plaque from the owners of Argea Prima in appreciation of the assistance rendered to their ship.

Valcour performed her duties so efficiently that the Chief of Naval Operations congratulated ComMidEastFor for her outstanding contribution to good foreign relations and for her enhancement of the prestige of the United States. The ship was also adjudged the outstanding seaplane tender in the Atlantic Fleet in 1957 and was awarded the Battle Readiness and Excellence Plaque and the Navy "E" in recognition of the accomplishment. During Valcour's 1960 Middle East cruise, she became the first American ship to visit the Seychelles Islands, an archipelago in the Indian Ocean, since 1912. In 1963, Valcour earned her second Navy "E".

In between her deployments to the Middle East, Valcour conducted local operations out of Naval Amphibious Base Little Creek at Virginia Beach, Virginia; Guantanamo Bay; and Kingston, Jamaica. Around 1960 Valcour received some conspicuous equipment upgrades, including a tripod mast with a newer air search radar and a tall communications antenna which, with its deckhouse, replaced the quadruple 40-millimeter antiaircraft gun mount on her fantail. In 1965, she qualified as a "blue nose" by crossing the Arctic Circle during operations in the Norwegian Sea.

Valcour completed her 15th Middle East cruise on 13 March 1965.

=== Service as "miscellaneous command flagship" (AGF-1) 1966–1971 ===
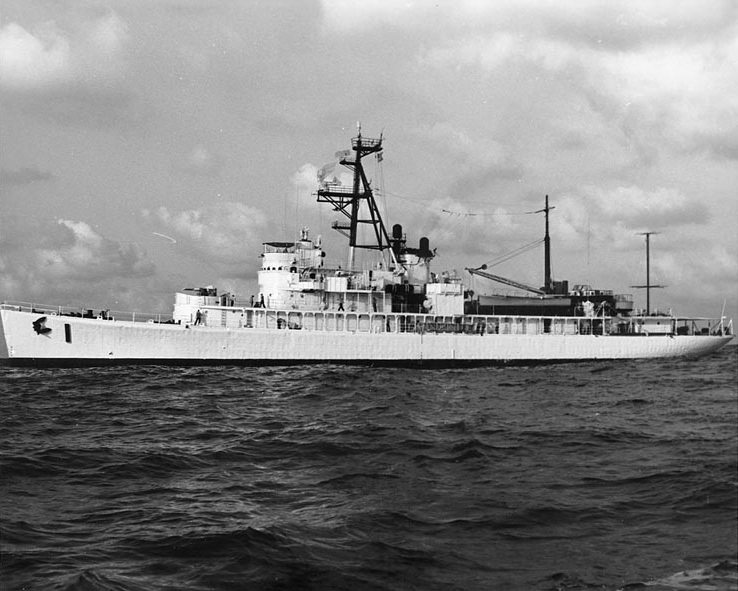
USS Valcour (AGF-1) as a specialized flagship in a photograph the United States Navy released in November 1972.

Soon after returning from her 15th cruise, a realignment took place under which Duxbury Bay and Gardiners Bay were ordered decommissioned and Valcour was selected to continue on a permanent basis the ComMidEastFor flagship duty previously performed by all three ships on a rotational basis. She was reclassified as a "miscellaneous command flagship" and designated AGF-1 on 15 December 1965. As AGF-1, Valcour' took on the mission was of command post, living facility, and communications center for ComMidEastFor and his staff of 15 officers.

Valcour departed the United States for the Middle East on 18 April 1966 for her 16th MidEastFor cruise, and her first as AGF-1. Tasked to demonstrate American interest and good will in the Middle East, Valcour distributed textbooks, medicine, clothing, and domestic machinery (such as sewing machines) to the needy under the auspices of Project Handclasp. Men from Valcour attempted to promote good relations with the countries Valcour visited by assisting in the construction of orphanages and schools, by participating in public functions, and by entertaining dignitaries, military representatives, and civilians. In addition, while watching merchant shipping lanes, Valcour had standing requirements to assist stricken ships and to evacuate Americans during crises in Middle Eastern countries.

Based at Bahrain, Valcour remained in the Middle East, save for a winter overhaul at Norfolk in 1968-69, until 1971. She became the permanent flagship for ComMidEastFor in 1971, but was selected in January 1972 for inactivation.

Relieved as flagship by miscellaneous command flagship (ex-landing platform dock) USS La Salle (ex-LPD-3) in the spring of 1972, Valcour returned to Norfolk via Colombo; Singapore; Brisbane, Australia; Wellington, New Zealand; Tahiti; Panama; and Fort Lauderdale, Florida. After four days at Fort Lauderdale, she arrived at Norfolk on 11 November 1972, completing an 18,132-nautical-mile (33,580 km; 20,866 mi) voyage from the Middle East.

=== Decommissioning and disposal ===
After being stripped of all usable gear over the ensuing months, Valcour was decommissioned on 15 January 1973; her name was struck from the Navy List simultaneously with her decommissioning. She shifted to the Inactive Ship Facility at Portsmouth, Virginia, so that she could be prepared for service as a test-bed for electromagnetic tests held under the auspices of the Naval Ordnance Laboratory (NOL), White Oak, Maryland. Towed from Norfolk to the Solomons Island, Maryland, branch of NOL in March 1974, she soon thereafter began her service as a test ship for the Electromagnetic Pulse Radiation Environment Simulation for Ships (EMPRESS) facility.

The U.S. Navy sold Valcour on 1 May 1977 to be broken up for scrap.

== Awards ==
- American Campaign Medal
- World War II Victory Medal
- National Defense Service Medal with star
