= Clark's Island =

Island in Massachusetts, United States

Coordinates: 42°00′30″N 70°38′15″W

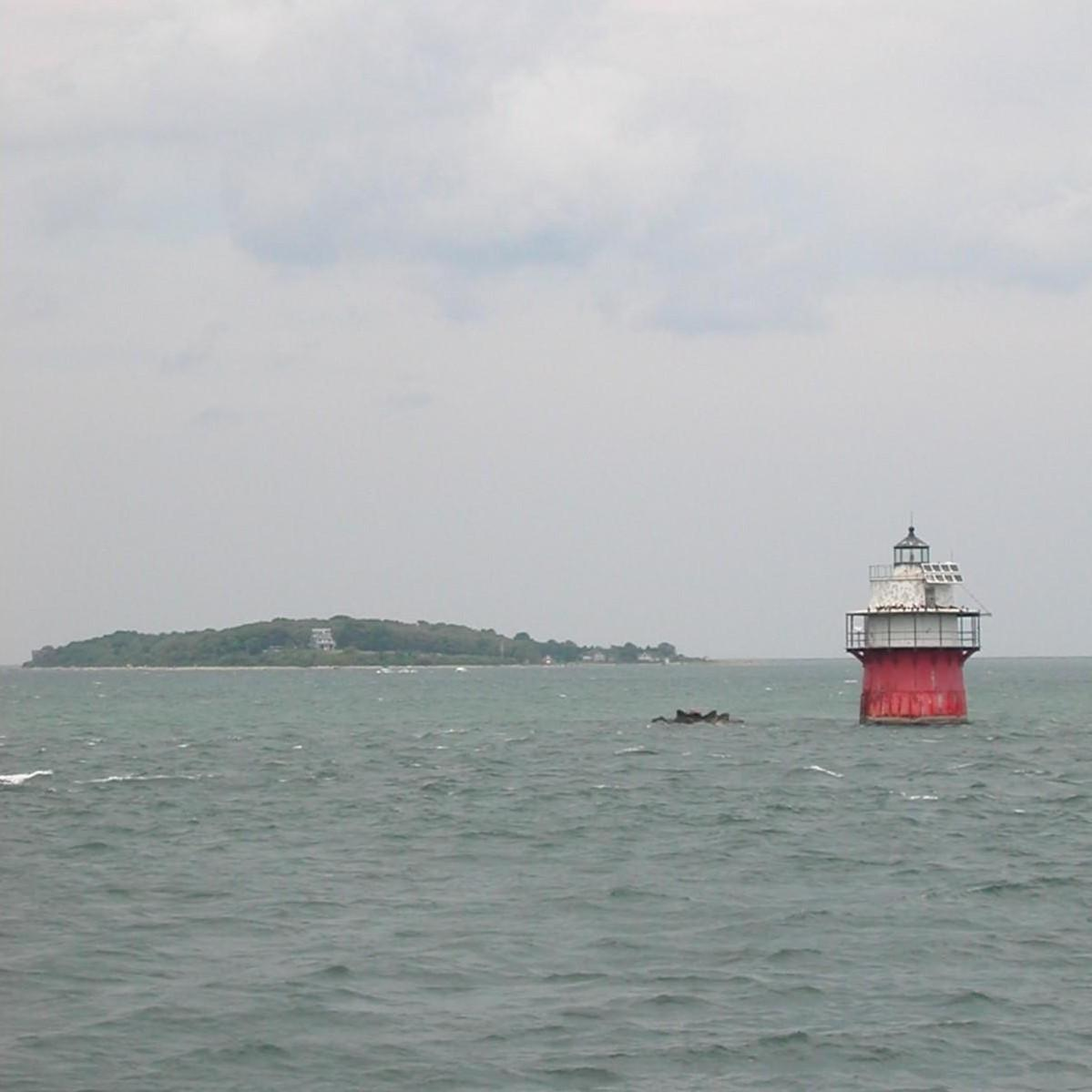
The Duxbury Pier Light with Clark's Island in the distance

Clark's Island is a small island located in Duxbury Bay in the U.S. state of Massachusetts. It was named for John Clark, the first mate of the Mayflower, the ship that brought the Pilgrims to New England. The island was initially considered for the location of the Pilgrim's settlement, but was rejected in favor of a site to the south, which became known as Plymouth, Massachusetts. Today Clark's Island is a part of the town of Plymouth.

== Location ==
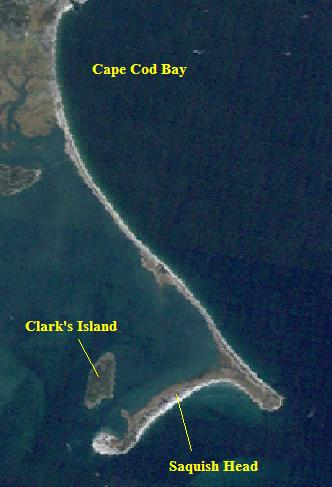
Clark's Island and Saquish Head visible from NASA's Landsat 3

Clark's Island is located in Duxbury Bay. Although physically closer to the town of Duxbury, the island is officially part of the town of Plymouth, as are the outermost points of Duxbury Beach, Saquish Neck and Gurnet Point. The island is located north of the Duxbury Pier Light (locally known as "Bug Light") and Saquish Neck, and west of Saquish Head. Clarks Island is an entirely private island.
