= Rocky Point (Massachusetts) =

Peninsula in Plymouth, Massachusetts

Coordinates: 41°56′59″N 70°35′00″W

Rocky Point is a peninsula in Plymouth, Massachusetts. The peninsula runs along Warren Cove and Plymouth Bay. The tip of the peninsula marks the convergence of Plymouth Bay and the larger Cape Cod Bay. The land rising from Plymouth Bay is considered to be the foothills to the Pine Hills.

The neighborhood of the same name runs along the shoreline from Route 3A just south of the merge with Plimoth Patuxet Highway to the Pilgrim Nuclear Generating Station. Kingdom Hall of Jehovah's Witnesses is located in the midsection of the neighborhood.

== Erosion ==
Heavy rains during July and August 2008 caused a failure of a storm drain on Rocky Hill Road east of Driftwood Lane. The rainwater was diverted, forming a 6-foot-wide (1.8 m) gully along a property downhill on Driftwood Lane and washing out a stretch of that road. While a town engineer has declared that property to be safe, the homeowners are fearful for their safety. The water also exposed the foundation of the house directly above that property on Rocky Hill Road.
