= Duxbury (surname) =

Duxbury is a surname. Notable people with the surname include:

- Mike Duxbury (born 1959), English footballer
- Lee Duxbury (born 1969), English footballer
- Graham Duxbury (born 1954), South African race driver
- Leslie Duxbury (1926–2005), British sports writer
- Lloyd L. Duxbury (1922–2002), American politician
- Robert Duxbury (1890–1962), English footballer

== See also ==
- Duxbury (disambiguation)
