= Plymouth Light =

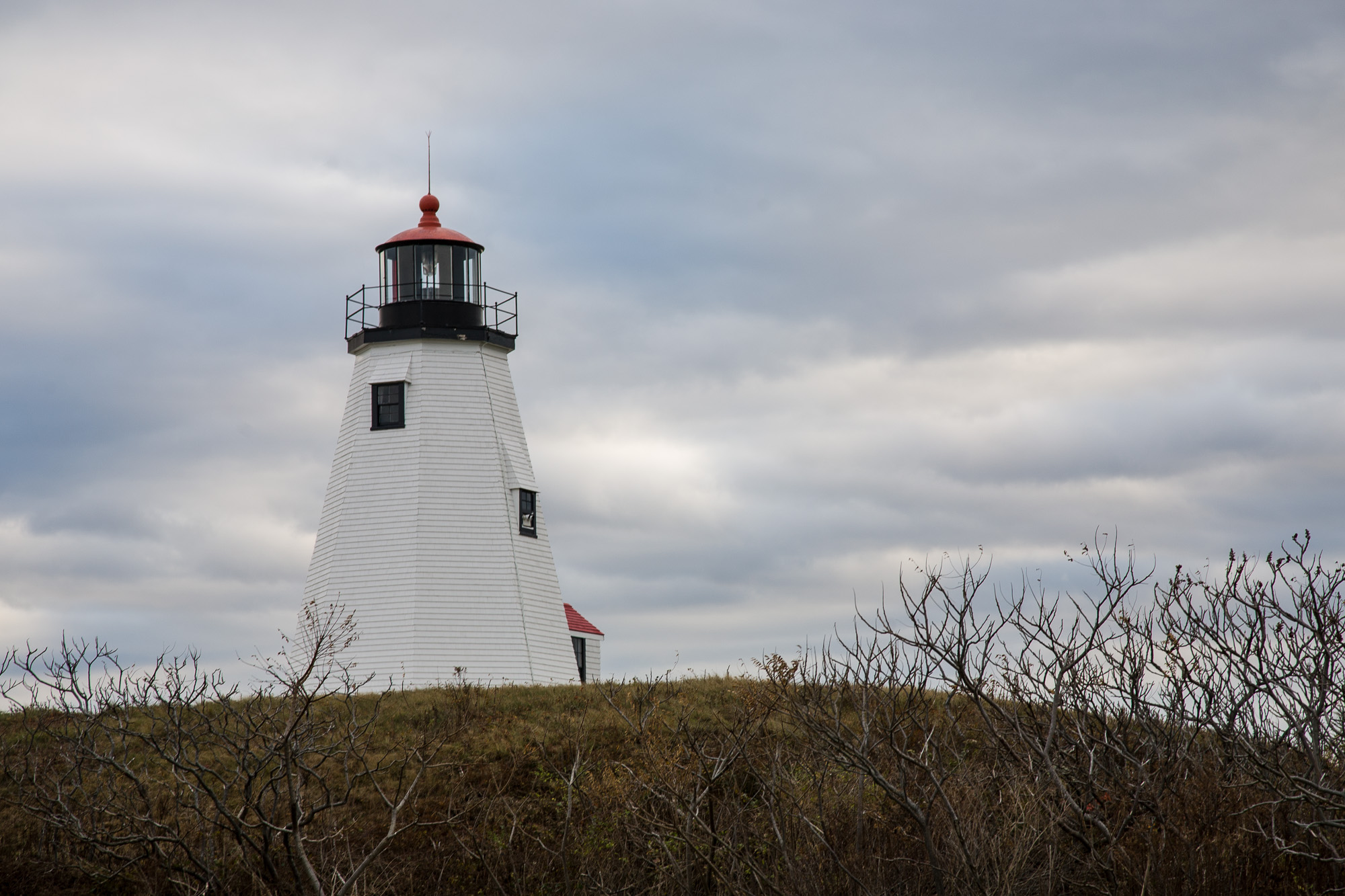
- Location: Plymouth, Massachusetts
- Coordinates: 42°0′13.3″N 70°36′2.2″W

Tower
- Constructed: 1768
- Foundation: Granite
- Construction: Cedar shingle
- Automated: 1986
- Height: 10 m (33 ft)
- Shape: Octagonal pyramidal
- Markings: White with black lantern and red roof
- Heritage: National Register of Historic Places listed place
- Fog signal: HORN: 2 every 15s

Light
- First lit: 1843 (current structure)
- Focal height: 102 feet (31 m)
- Lens: 4th order Fresnel lens (original), 3.9 inches (100 mm) (current)
- Range: white:17 nautical miles (31 km; 20 mi) & red:15 nautical miles (28 km; 17 mi)
- Characteristic: Fl W (3) 10s with R sector
- Plymouth Light Station
- U.S. National Register of Historic Places
- Nearest city: Duxbury, Massachusetts
- Area: less than one acre
- Built: 1910
- MPS: Lighthouses of Massachusetts TR (AD)
- NRHP reference No.: 77000655
- Added to NRHP: March 08, 1977

Plymouth Light, also known as Gurnet Light, is a historic lighthouse located on Gurnet Point at the entrance to Plymouth Bay in the town of Plymouth, Massachusetts. The light is accessible only by passing through the town of Duxbury, which lies to the north. The tower is located inside the earthworks of Fort Andrew, which existed in the Civil War, War of 1812, and Revolutionary War.

The original lighthouse was built in 1768, burned down and rebuilt in 1801, when the single light became a pair, and rebuilt again in 1842, again as a pair. The light gradually lost importance as Plymouth Harbor silted up and lost most of its traffic. Then, when the Cape Cod Canal opened in 1914, there was a significant increase in vessel traffic past the light. The northeast tower was torn down and the remaining tower upgraded from a sixth order Fresnel lens to one of the fourth order. The fourth order lens is now on display at the Lifesaving Museum in Hull, Massachusetts. The light is the oldest wooden lighthouse in the United States. The light was relocated approximately 140 feet (43 m) to the north in December 1998 because of beach erosion; this placed it within the earthworks of Fort Andrew. The property and the Duxbury Pier Light, in open water 2.3 nmi (4.3 km; 2.6 mi) to the SW are both managed by Project Gurnet and Bug Lights, Inc.

The site is also known for being staffed by America's first female lighthouse keeper.

The actual light is 102 feet (31 m) above Mean High Water. Its white light is visible for 17 nautical miles (31 km; 20 mi); its red sector, which covers Mary Ann Rocks, is visible 15 nautical miles (28 km; 17 mi).

Plymouth Light was listed on the National Register of Historic Places as Plymouth Light Station on March 8, 1977.

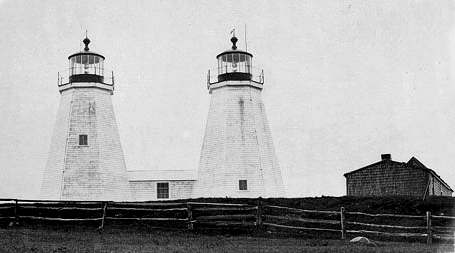
Twin towers at the Gurnet, 1842 to 1924

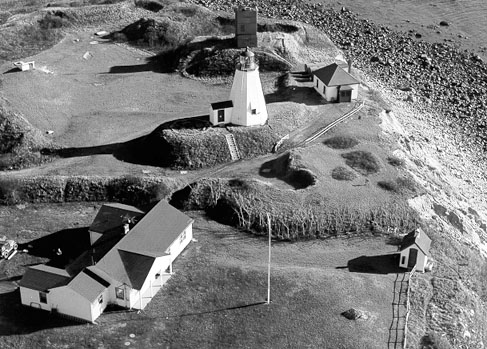
U.S. Coast Guard Photo

== See also ==
- National Register of Historic Places listings in Plymouth County, Massachusetts
