= Plymouth Beach, Massachusetts =

Village in Massachusetts, United States

Coordinates: 41°57′45″N 70°38′20″W

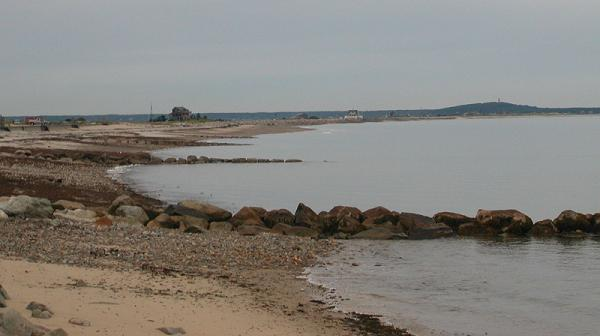
The Plymouth Barrier Beach, as seen from Plymouth Beach village

Plymouth Beach (also called Plymouth Long Beach or The Point) is a small village located in Plymouth, Massachusetts, United States. It is located directly south of Plymouth Center, and is adjacent to Plimoth Patuxet (formerly Plimoth Plantation). Plymouth Beach consists of a motel, a restaurant and a small beachside community along Warren Cove.

== Barrier beach ==
The village of Plymouth Beach is best known for its prominent barrier beach. The beach is approximately three miles in length. It begins just south of the Eel River bridge on Route 3A, and juts out almost due north, running along the last ½ mile (0.8 km) of the river before it empties into Plymouth Harbor. The barrier beach offers protection of Plymouth Harbor.

Plymouth Beach is also an important breeding and nesting site for several threatened and endangered shorebirds, including the piping plover and the least, Arctic, common and roseate terns. The beach is a critical checkpoint in migratory birds' flight. The birds stop at Plymouth beach to rejuvenate. The birds' routes typically span up to 3,000 miles (4,858 km) of non-stop flight. The barrier beach is intensively managed by the Town of Plymouth to allow some recreational activities while protecting nesting birds and the fragile barrier beach system. Plover and tern nesting areas are monitored and protected by Town staff. One of the largest common tern colonies in Massachusetts is located at the point. Plymouth Beach has a mix of public and private ownership, with 90% of the barrier beach owned by the Town of Plymouth.

== Gallery ==
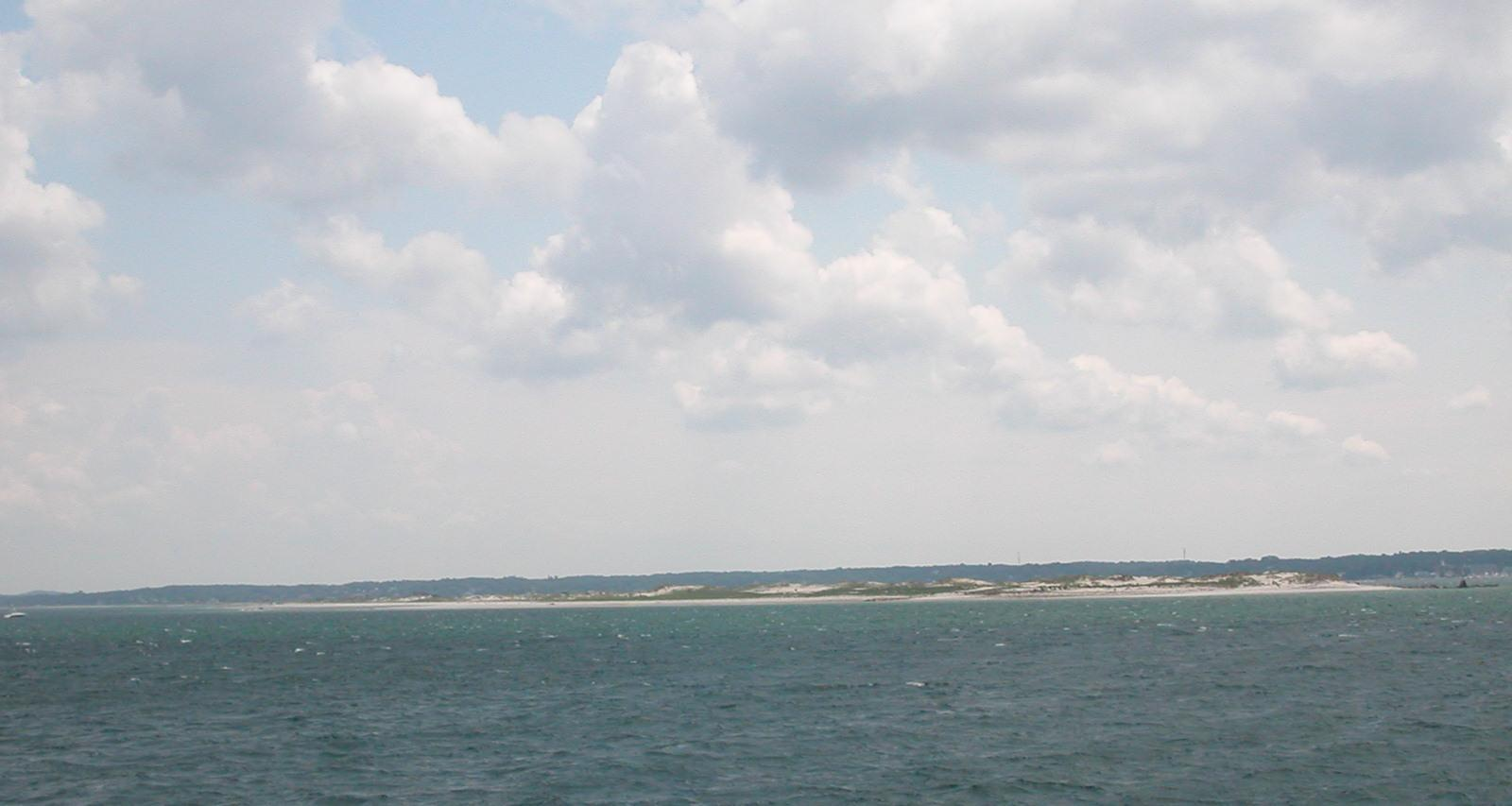
Plymouth Beach from Plymouth Bay

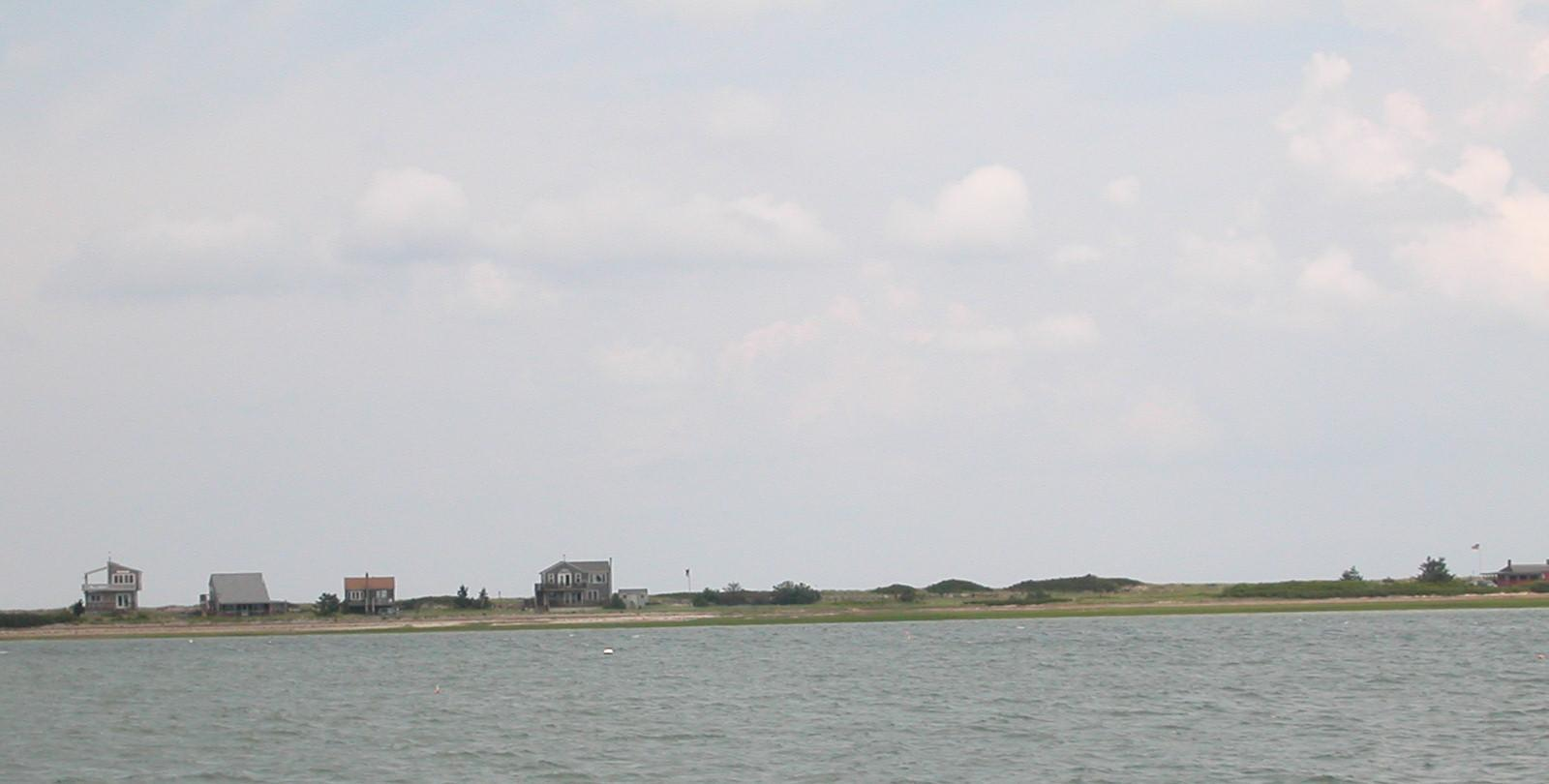
Houses on Plymouth Beach

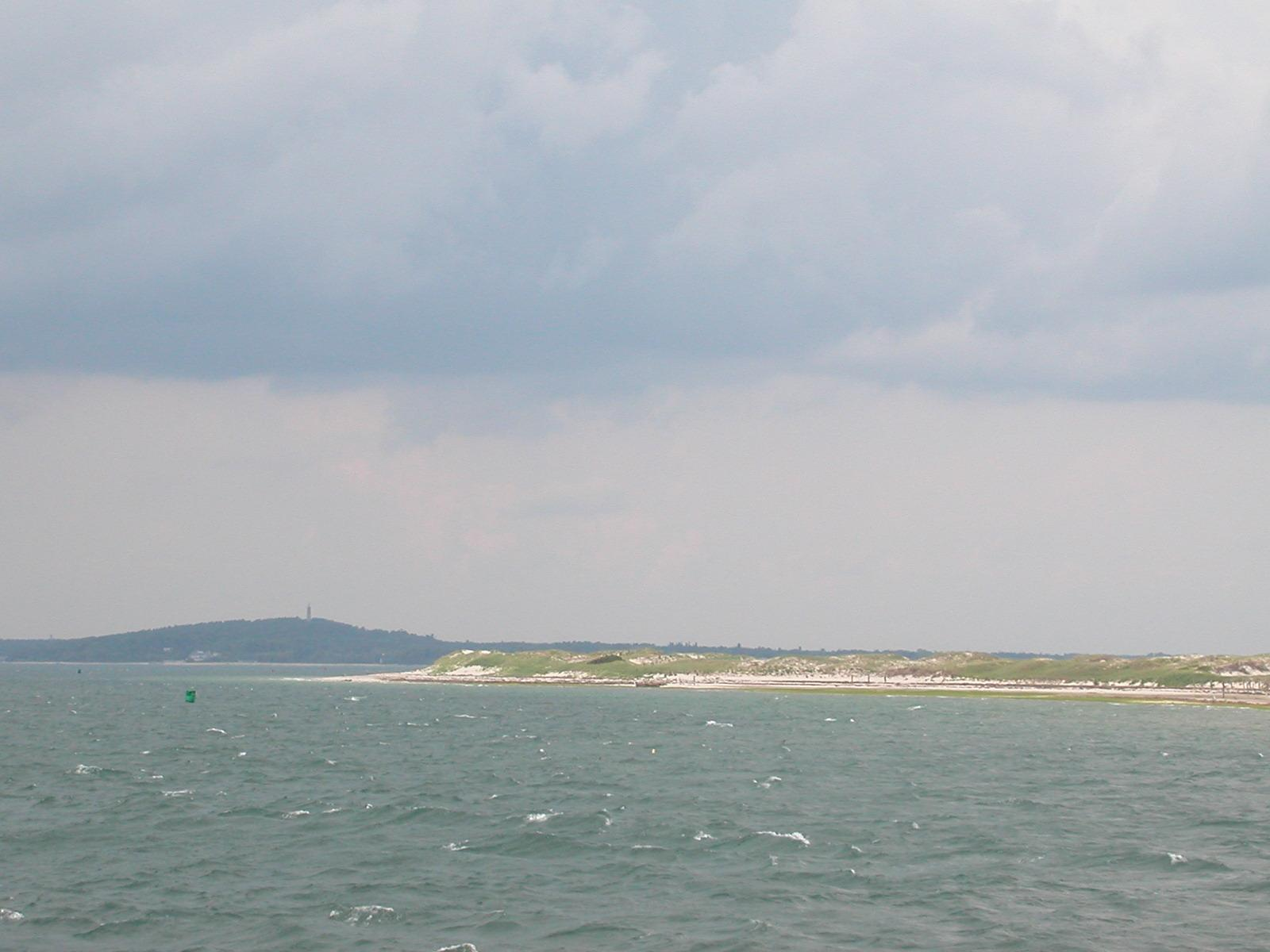
Tip of Plymouth Beach, with Duxbury in the distance

== See also ==
- Neighborhoods in Plymouth, Massachusetts
