= USS Duxbury Bay =

Tender of the United States Navy

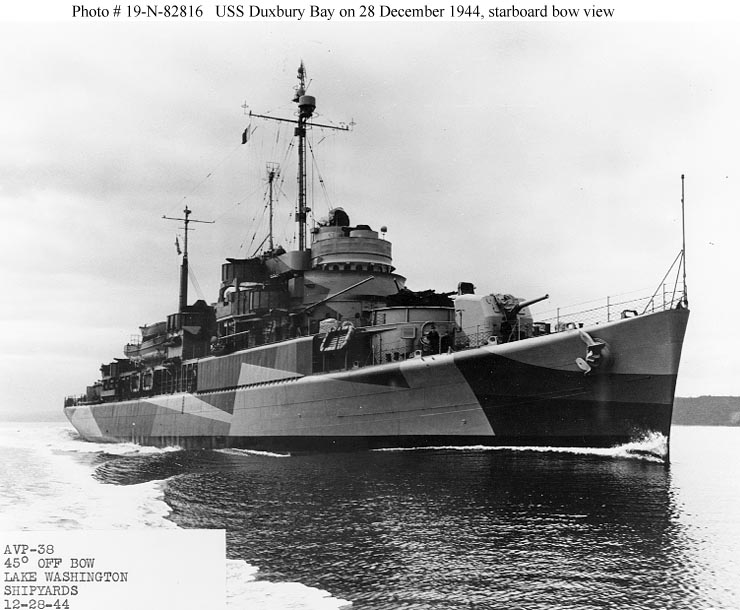
- USS Duxbury Bay (AVP-38) off Houghton, Washington on 28 December 1944

History

United States
- Name: USS Duxbury Bay
- Namesake: Duxbury Bay, on the coast of Massachusetts
- Builder: Lake Washington Shipyard, Houghton, Washington
- Laid down: 17 January 1944
- Launched: 2 October 1944
- Sponsored by: Mrs. R. E. Torkelson
- Commissioned: 31 December 1944
- Decommissioned: 30 April 1966
- Stricken: 1 May 1966
- Fate: Sold for scrapping July 1967

General characteristics
- Class & type: Barnegat-class small seaplane tender
- Displacement: 1,766 tons (light); 2,750 tons (full load)
- Length: 310 ft 9 in (94.72 m)
- Beam: 41 ft 1 in (12.52 m)
- Draft: 13 ft 6 in (4.11 m)
- Installed power: 6,000 horsepower (4.48 megawatts)
- Propulsion: Diesel engines, two shafts
- Speed: 18 knots (33 km/h)
- Complement: 215 (ship's company); 367 (including aviation unit)
- Sensors & processing systems: Radar; sonar
- Armament: 1 × single 5 in (130 mm) 38-caliber dual-purpose gun mount (removed ca. 1956); 1 × quad 40-mm antiaircraft gun mount; 2 × dual 40-mm antiaircraft gun mounts; 4 × dual 20-mm antiaircraft gun mounts; 2 × depth charge tracks
- Aviation facilities: Supplies, spare parts, repairs, and berthing for one seaplane squadron; 80,000 US gallons (300,000 L) aviation fuel

USS Duxbury Bay (AVP-38) was a United States Navy Barnegat-class small seaplane tender in commission from 1944 to 1966.

== Construction and commissioning ==
Duxbury Bay was launched on 2 October 1944 by Lake Washington Shipyard, Houghton, Washington, sponsored by Mrs R. E. Torkelson. Duxbury Bay was commissioned on 31 December 1944.

== World War II operations ==
Duxbury Bay departed San Diego, California, on 12 March 1945, called at Pearl Harbor, Hawaii, and tended seaplanes at Eniwetok and Ulithi Atoll before arriving at Kerama Retto off Okinawa on 29 April 1945. She supported the United States Third Fleet through service as seadrome control tender, mail ship, movie exchange, and gasoline supply ship for small craft until cessation of hostilities with Japan and the end of World War II on 15 August 1945.

== Operations in the Far East 1945–1948 ==
After the end of World War II, Duxbury Bay served in the Far East, tending patrol squadrons at Shanghai and Tsingtao in China, Jinsen in Korea, and Hong Kong. She then returned to the United States, arriving at San Francisco, California, on 20 October 1946.

Duxbury Bay served another tour of duty in the Far East from 25 February 1947 to 8 September 1947, operating out of Yokosuka, Japan, and Okinawa. She returned to the Far East for another tour from 2 February 1948 to 27 July 1948, tending seaplanes patrolling over Chinese territory during the expansion of Communist control in China.

== Around-the-world cruise 1949 ==
Departing Long Beach, California, on 17 March 1949, Duxbury Bay headed west on the first leg of a round-the-world cruise. She spent one month as flagship for Commander, Persian Gulf, then moved on to arrive at Norfolk, Virginia, on 3 July 1949.

== Exercises in Nova Scotia 1949 ==
Between 29 October 1949 and 21 November 1949, Duxbury Bay operated as a seaplane tender at Halifax, Nova Scotia, during cold-weather exercises.

== Middle Eastern and Indian Ocean service 1950–1966 ==
Between 4 January 1950 and early 1966, Duxbury Bay served 15 tours of duty in the Persian Gulf, the Arabian Sea, and the Indian Ocean as flagship for Commander, United States Middle East Force. On average, she made one cruise per year, based in Bahrain, spending the intervening periods in upkeep at her home port of Norfolk and undergoing refresher training at Guantanamo Bay Naval Base in Cuba. During most of this period the Middle East flagship duty rotated between Duxbury Bay and two other Barnegat-class ships, USS Greenwich Bay (AVP-41) and USS Valcour (AVP-55), all eventually painted white and specially fitted for the purpose.

Duxbury Bay's Middle East service was highlighted by a number of important diplomatic missions. During her 1951 tour, her crew members served on security patrol and as messengers for the Southeast Asia Treaty Conference at Ceylon at which Commander, Middle East Force, represented the United States Department of Defense. She was visited by Emperor Haile Selassie of Ethiopia in February 1953 and transported him to French Somaliland. Homeward bound during her 1954–1955 tour, she sailed by way of Mombasa, Kenya; Durban, Union of South Africa; and Rio de Janeiro, Brazil, for good-will visits.

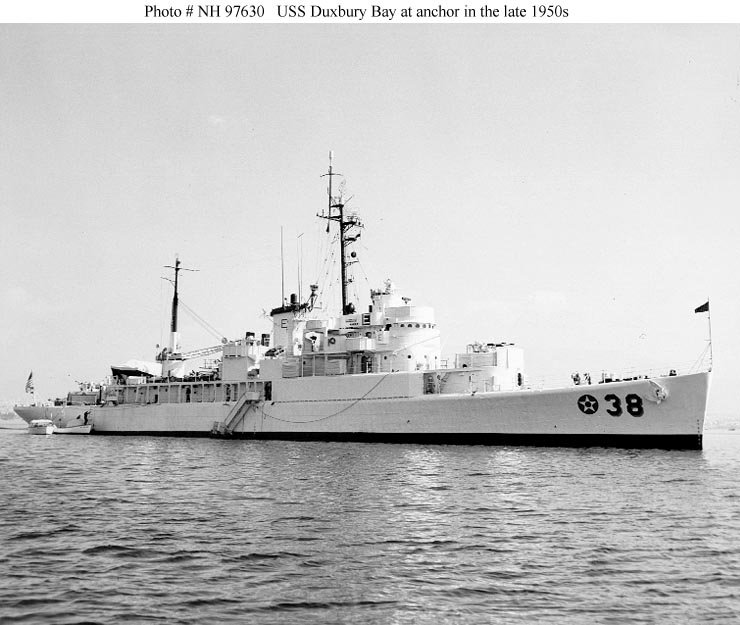
Duxbury Bay as Middle East Force flagship ca. 1959.

Duxbury Bay departed Norfolk on 3 October 1956 and was headed for her regular assignment when the 1956 Suez Crisis broke out. With the Suez Canal blocked, she was stationed on patrol in the Mediterranean Sea off the eastern end of Crete assisting in the operation of the Souda Bay airfield for aircraft of the United Nations Emergency Force. She also carried underwater demolition teams to Saros Bay, Turkey, for survey operations in February 1957 before returning to Norfolk on 11 March 1957.

During her next cruise, in January 1958, Duxbury Bay joined in flood relief at Ceylon.

Duxbury Bay paid a special call to Karachi, Pakistan, in December 1959 on the occasion of the visit of President Dwight D. Eisenhower to India and Pakistan.

During the October 1962 Cuban Missile Crisis, Duxbury Bay participated in the evacuation of civilians from the Guantanamo Bay Naval Base.

During May 1963 Duxbury Bay participated in Project Mercury as a recovery ship for the final Mercury space mission, the Mercury-Atlas 9 mission flown by Leroy Gordon Cooper, Jr.

== Decommissioning and disposal ==
Duxbury Bay was decommissioned on 30 April 1966, only a few months after returning from her last deployment, and stricken from the Naval Vessel Register on 1 May 1966. She was sold for scrap in July 1967.
