= Fort Andrew =

Fort Andrew/Gurnet Fort
- Gurnet Point, Plymouth, Massachusetts
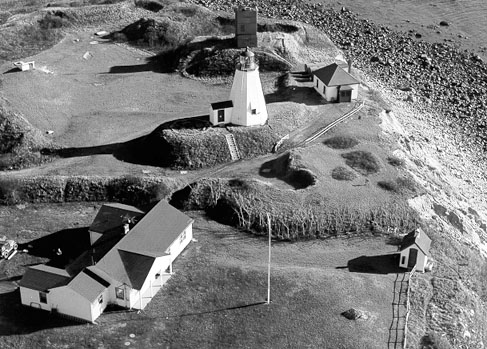
- Fort Andrew's earthworks and Plymouth Light

Site information
- Type: Coastal defense
- Owner: private
- Controlled by: US Coast Guard
- Open to the public: seasonal with lighthouse
- Condition: earthworks remain

Location
- Location in Massachusetts Fort Andrew/Gurnet Fort (the United States)
- Coordinates: 42.005172°N 70.599517°W

Site history
- Built: 1776
- In use: 1776–1869
- Materials: earthworks
- Battles/wars: American Revolutionary War; War of 1812; American Civil War

Fort Andrew is a former fort built as Gurnet Fort in 1776 for the American Revolutionary War on Gurnet Point in Plymouth, Massachusetts. It became a federal fort and was rebuilt in 1808, and again in 1863 during the Civil War when it received its current name. It is named for John A. Andrew, governor of Massachusetts 1861–1866. In 1863 Fort Standish was built nearby on Saquish Head. After the war, the federal government declared Fort Andrew an inactive military reservation in 1869. The reservation was sold in 1926 and mostly became private property, except for the US Coast Guard light station. A World War II fire control tower was built on the parapet of the old fort. Plymouth (Gurnet Point) lighthouse is also on Gurnet Point, and was moved inside the fort's earthworks to protect it from beach erosion in 1997–1998.

== History ==
Gurnet Fort was built in 1776 for the American Revolutionary War, via a resolution of the Massachusetts General Court of June 3, 1776. It had six guns and a 60-man garrison, almost half from nearby Duxbury. The guns were smoothbore cannon, including three 12-pounders, two 9-pounders, and one 6-pounder. The lighthouse was first built in 1768, thus preceding the fort. In 1776, HMS Niger briefly engaged Gurnet Fort while searching for patriot privateers. Niger grounded but was soon refloated. One of Plymouth Light's two beacons at the time was destroyed, but there were no other casualties.

Gurnet Fort was rebuilt with five guns in 1808 as part of the federal second system of U.S. fortifications. As with many federal forts prior to the 1890s, it does not seem to have had an official name in this era. It appears in the secretary of war's reports on fortifications dated December 1808 and December 1811. In 1808 it is mentioned as "the old work on Gurnet head, near Plymouth, has been repaired, and platforms in front". In 1811 the entry reads: "At the Gurnet Point, the entrance of the harbor; the old fort has been repaired with stone and sods, mounting five heavy guns...". One source states the fort was further rebuilt during the War of 1812 to accommodate 42-pounder guns, the largest the United States had at that time.

In 1863 during the Civil War the fort was rebuilt and renamed Fort Andrew, with the rebuilding designed and supervised by Major Charles E. Blunt of the United States Army Corps of Engineers. It could accommodate four guns plus three not mounted, with a bombproof shelter and two magazines. The seven guns installed during the Civil War consisted of four eight-inch (203 mm) smoothbores and three 32-pounder rifled pieces. An eighth piece at Fort Andrew was a "light field piece", possibly a 6-pounder field gun or similar.

== Development ==
Through two separate transactions, one in 1808 and another in 1870, the government acquired the 11.9 acres (48,000 m^{2}) that constituted Fort Andrew. In 1927, the War Department transferred the property to the U.S. Department of Treasury for use as a US Coast Guard Station. The use of the site prior to the government's acquisition is unknown, but it currently contains a residential area, a Coast Guard facility, and a lighthouse.

Researchers (presumably in the 1990s or 2000s connected with the Formerly Used Defense Sites (FUDS) program) uncovered no information pertaining to the facilities and activities of Fort Andrew (FUDS Site No. D01MA051400) prior to the Civil War. In 1863, the military rebuilt the fort and placed seven coastal defense weapons at Fort Andrew. By 30 June 1867, the fort possessed an additional light field piece installed on a temporary firing platform, which was removed by April 1880. A records search uncovered no information pertaining to the operation of the fort after 1880. The INPR indicates that the Department of Treasury acquired the land for the US Coast Guard in 1927, ending its use by the War Department, except for a 1.7-acre (6,900 m^{2}) tract that the War Department used for a fire control tower in World War II. Documents located by the research team did not mention the use of any CWM at this site.

== Present ==
The lighthouse remains within the fort's earthworks. The World War II fire control tower was demolished at some time postwar. The fort is only accessible to the public during seasonal open houses at the lighthouse.

== See also ==
- Seacoast defense in the United States
- List of coastal fortifications of the United States
- List of military installations in Massachusetts
