= Fort Standish (Plymouth, Massachusetts) =

Fort in Massachusetts

- Saquish Head, Plymouth, Massachusetts

Site information
- Type: Coastal defense
- Owner: private
- Open to the public: no
- Condition: earthworks remain

Location
- Location in Massachusetts Fort Standish (the United States)
- Coordinates: 41°59′43.13″N 70°37′53.85″W

Site history
- Built: 1863
- In use: 1863–1870
- Materials: earthworks
- Battles/wars: American Civil War

Fort Standish was a fort built in 1863 for the American Civil War on Saquish Head in Plymouth, Massachusetts. It was named for Myles Standish, military leader of the Plymouth Colony in the 1620s, and augmented the nearby Fort Andrew on Gurnet Point. It was designed and constructed under the supervision of Major Charles E. Blunt of the United States Army Corps of Engineers. The fort had five gun emplacements with five 8-inch smoothbore guns, along with a bombproof shelter, two magazines, and a well. Outside the fort were a barracks, officers' quarters, and a mess hall. From January to June 1865 the fort was garrisoned by the 27th Unattached Company of Massachusetts militia.

The fort was placed in caretaker status following the Civil War, remaining so at least through World War I. The military reservation was purchased by the federal government and declared inactive in 1870. Reportedly, the fort and/or the reservation were used in the Spanish–American War and World War I. The land was sold in 1925 to a private buyer.

== See also ==
- Seacoast defense in the United States
- List of coastal fortifications of the United States
- List of military installations in Massachusetts
