= USS Greenwich Bay =

Tender of the United States Navy

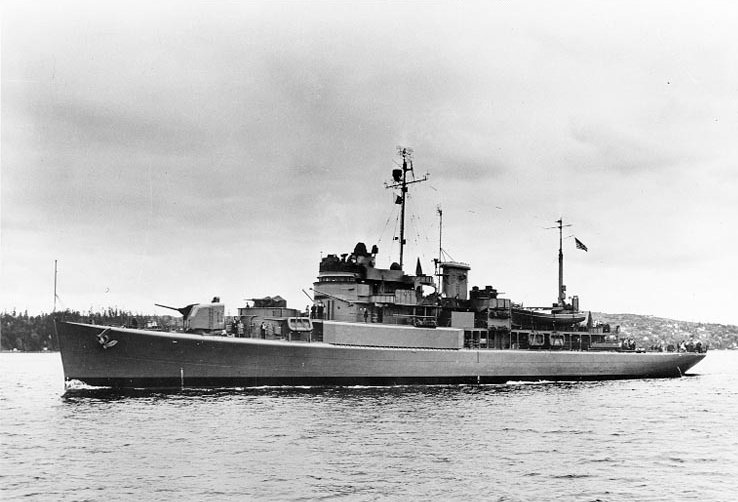
- USS Greenwich Bay (AVP-41) in May 1945

History

United States
- Name: USS Greenwich Bay
- Namesake: Greenwich Bay, off the coast of Rhode Island
- Builder: Lake Washington Shipyard, Houghton, Washington
- Laid down: 18 July 1944
- Launched: 17 March 1945
- Sponsored by: Mrs. Francis B. Johnson
- Commissioned: 20 May 1945
- Decommissioned: June 1966
- Stricken: 1 July 1966
- Fate: Sold for scrapping 21 June 1967

General characteristics
- Class & type: Barnegat-class small seaplane tender
- Displacement: 1,766 tons (light); 2,750 tons (full load)
- Length: 310 ft 9 in (94.72 m)
- Beam: 41 ft 1 in (12.52 m)
- Draught: 13 ft 6 in (4.11 m)
- Installed power: 6,000 horsepower (4.48 megawatts)
- Propulsion: Diesel engines, two shafts
- Speed: 18 knots (33 km/h)
- Complement: 215 (ship's company); 367 (including aviation unit)
- Sensors & processing systems: Radar; sonar
- Armament: 1 × 5 in (130 mm) guns; 6 × 40 mm guns; 2 × depth charge tracks
- Aviation facilities: Supplies, spare parts, repairs, and berthing for one seaplane squadron; 80,000 US gallons (300,000 L) aviation fuel

USS Greenwich Bay (AVP-41), was a United States Navy Barnegat-class small seaplane tender in commission from 1945 to 1966.

== Construction and commissioning ==
Greenwich Bay was laid down on 18 July 1944 at Lake Washington Shipyard, Houghton, Washington. She was launched on 17 March 1945, sponsored by Mrs. Francis B. Johnson, wife of the Commander of Fleet Air Wing 6 (FAW-6), and commissioned on 20 May 1945.

== Post-World War II occupation duty 1945–1946 ==
Greenwich Bay had not yet left the United States West Coast when World War II ended with the cessation of hostilities with Japan on 15 August 1945. Departing San Diego, California, on 26 August 1945, she called at Pearl Harbor in Hawaii, Midway Atoll, and Okinawa before arriving at Taku, China, on 5 October 1945. Greenwich Bay spent the rest of 1945 along the China coast, touching at Tsingtao and Shanghai as well as Taku, tending seaplanes of the United States Seventh Fleet. She operated in Japanese waters during January 1946, and after a short stint in the Philippine Islands, departed for the United States on 1 May 1946. Calling at Hong Kong; Singapore; Naples, Italy; Casablanca, French Morocco; and Gibraltar during the voyage, she arrived at Norfolk, Virginia on 1 July 1946. She then moved to New York City for overhaul.

== Escort duty for the Presidential Yacht 1947–1948 ==
Greenwich Bay reported to the Potomac River Naval Command on 19 February 1947 to serve as escort to USS Williamsburg (AGC-369), ex-PG-56, the Presidential yacht. This assignment ended on 21 June 1948.

== Around-the-world cruise 1948 ==
Greenwich Bay departed Norfolk on 21 June 1948 for an around-the-world cruise. During The four-month voyage, she made good-will visits to Gibraltar; Port Said, Egypt; Muscat; Bahrain, Kuwait, Trincomalee, Ceylon; Fremantle, Australia; Pago Pago, American Samoa; Papeete, Tahiti; and Coco Solo, Panama Canal Zone, before returning to Norfolk on 14 October 1948.

== Middle East service 1949–1966 ==
Greenwich Bay departed Norfolk on 30 April 1949 to assume duties as flagship for the Commander of the U.S. Navy Middle East Force. Every year thereafter she repeated this duty, sailing through the Mediterranean to operate as flagship in the Red Sea, Persian Gulf, and Indian Ocean for 4 to 6 months. In total Greenwich Bay made fifteen Mediterranean deployments. During most of this period, she performed these duties in rotation with two other Barnegat-class ships, USS Duxbury Bay (AVP-38) and USS Valcour (AVP-55). These three ships were dubbed the "little white fleet", in reference to the white paint jobs they shared to counter the region's extreme heat.

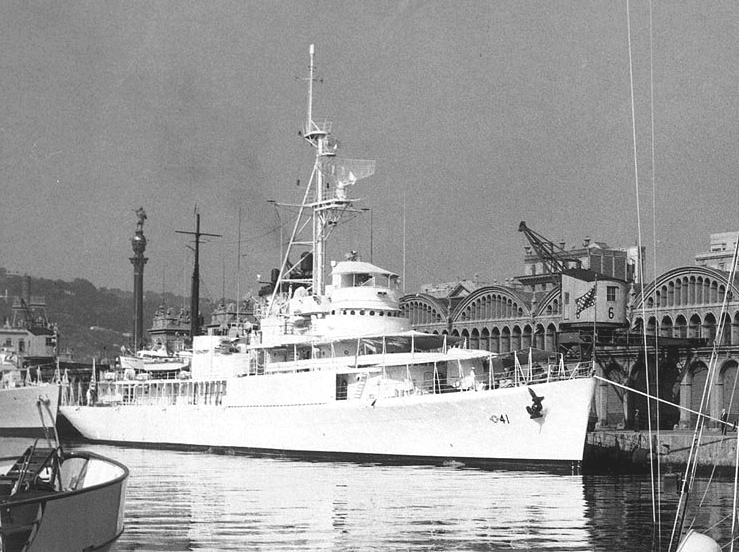
USS Greenwich Bay (AVP-41) visits Barcelona, Spain, in May or early June 1961 on her way to that year's deployment as flagship in the Middle East.

Ports which Greenwich Bay visited as part of her official duties as flagship included Recife, Brazil; Lisbon, Portugal; and virtually every major Mediterranean, Persian Gulf, Indian Ocean, and Red Sea city as well as several African ones. Among them were Malta; Bombay and Madras, India; Istanbul, Turkey; Athens, Greece; Beirut, Lebanon; Mombassa, Kenya; Cannes, France; and Karachi, Pakistan. In addition to operating with foreign naval units in the Mediterranean, Red Sea, Persian Gulf, and Indian Ocean, Greenwich Bay performed extensive work in the People-to-People program, particularly in carrying drugs and other medical supplies to Arab and African nations, and operated as an important tool of diplomacy in the region. In her Middle East duties, which were punctuated by local operations and exercises out of Norfolk, Greenwich Bay was visited by many dignitaries, including King Ibn Saud of Saudi Arabia, the Shah of Iran, Emperor Haile Selassie of Ethiopia, and the Shaikh of Kuwait.

In 1950 Greenwich Bay's crew distinguished itself in Bahrain, as Air France planes crashed there on 13 June 1950 and 15 June 1950 while attempting to make early-morning landings on a fog-shrouded airfield. Greenwich Bay sent out a total of six search-and-rescue missions on those two days. On 15 June 1950 one of her launches, containing both her captain and medical officer, succeeded in rescuing nine survivors of the crash. For her heroic actions, Greenwich Bay received the special commendation and thanks of both the Arabian and French governments.

When the Suez Crisis flared up in 1956, Greenwich Bay extended her normal cruise in the Persian Gulf to be able to evacuate American dependents and civilians if necessary. As a result of the blocking of the Suez Canal, she had to return to the United States around the Cape of Good Hope.

== Decommissioning and disposal ==
After completing her fifteenth Middle East deployment, Greenwich Bay was decommissioned in June 1966 and stricken from the Navy List on 1 July 1966. She was sold for scrapping on 21 June 1967 to Boston Metals Company of Baltimore, Maryland.
