= Saquish =

Beach near Plymouth, Massachusetts

Coordinates: 42.003578°N 70.624336°W

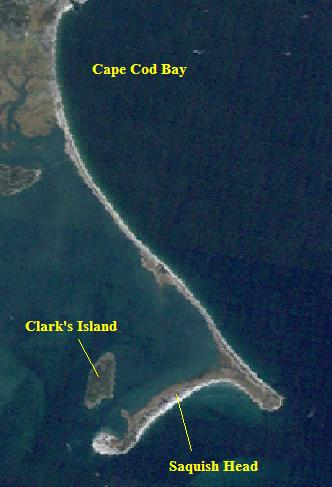
Map of Saquish Neck showing Saquish Head

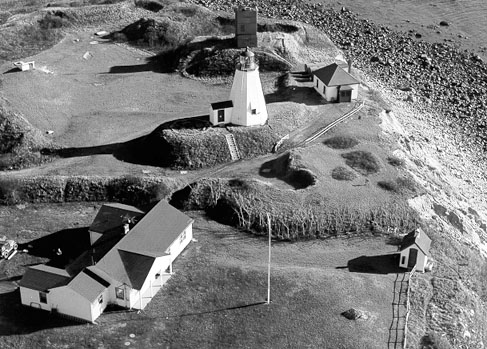
Plymouth Light in the earthworks of Fort Andrew

Saquish Beach, sometimes simply referred to as Saquish, is a beach and headland located at the end of the peninsula at the entrance to Plymouth Bay in Plymouth, Massachusetts. A small private settlement of summer cottages line the beach and headland, sometimes referred to as Saquish Neck and Saquish Head respectively. It is located east of Clark's Island and west of Gurnet Point. Its only access by land is from the Powder Point Bridge at Duxbury Beach, 5 miles to the north by foot or by 4-wheel drive beach buggies. As a private beach, access is restricted to property owners, residents, and their guests.

Saquish was likely an island at the time of the arrival of the Pilgrims. The prevailing story concerning the name "Saquish" is that it derives from a Wampanoag name meaning "abundance of clams," but one writer says he believes it to mean "small creek."

The peninsula includes Plymouth Light and the remains of the Civil War Fort Andrew and Fort Standish. Fort Andrew was preceded by Gurnet Fort in the Revolutionary War.

Today, many summer cottages line the beach. Because there is no electrical connection with the mainland, houses operate under solar, wind, or propane power. The nearest retail and service area is in Hall's Corner, Duxbury. Catholic mass is held weekly on the beach on Saturdays from Independence Day to Labor Day. Entrance to the Gurnet Point and Saquish is guarded by security services and it is required that visitors check in prior to entering the beach.

== See also ==
- Neighborhoods in Plymouth, Massachusetts
