= Gurnet Point, Massachusetts =

Coordinates: 42°00′18.62″N 70°35′58.26″W

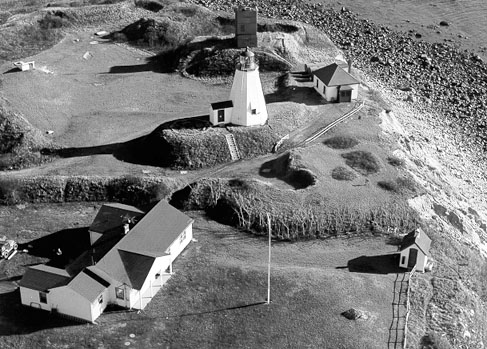
Plymouth Light in the earthworks of Fort Andrew

Gurnet Point, also known as The Gurnet, is located at the end of the peninsula at the entrance to Plymouth Bay in Plymouth, Massachusetts, and is a headland and the small private settlement located on it. The Pilgrims who settled Plymouth in 1620 named it Gurnett's Nose for its resemblance to headlands in the English Channel where gurnett fish were plentiful. The Gurnet (pronounced gurn-it with the accent on the first syllable) is the home of Plymouth (Gurnet) Lighthouse as well as Fort Andrew from the Revolutionary War and Civil War. Its access by land is either from Gurnet Road in Duxbury or from the Powder Point Bridge at Duxbury Beach 5 miles to the north by foot or by 4-wheel drive beach buggies, but access is restricted to property owners, residents and their guests, except for once a year on Memorial Day when the lighthouse is open to the public.
