= Plymouth Bay =

Coordinates: 41°58′00″N 70°36′00″W

Plymouth Bay is a small, well-protected bay of the Atlantic Ocean on the western shore of larger Cape Cod Bay along the coastline of the Commonwealth of Massachusetts. Plymouth Bay retains historical significance for the landing at Plymouth Rock in 1620 by the Pilgrims aboard the Mayflower who proceeded to establish the second permanent Northern European settlement in North America at Plymouth Colony.

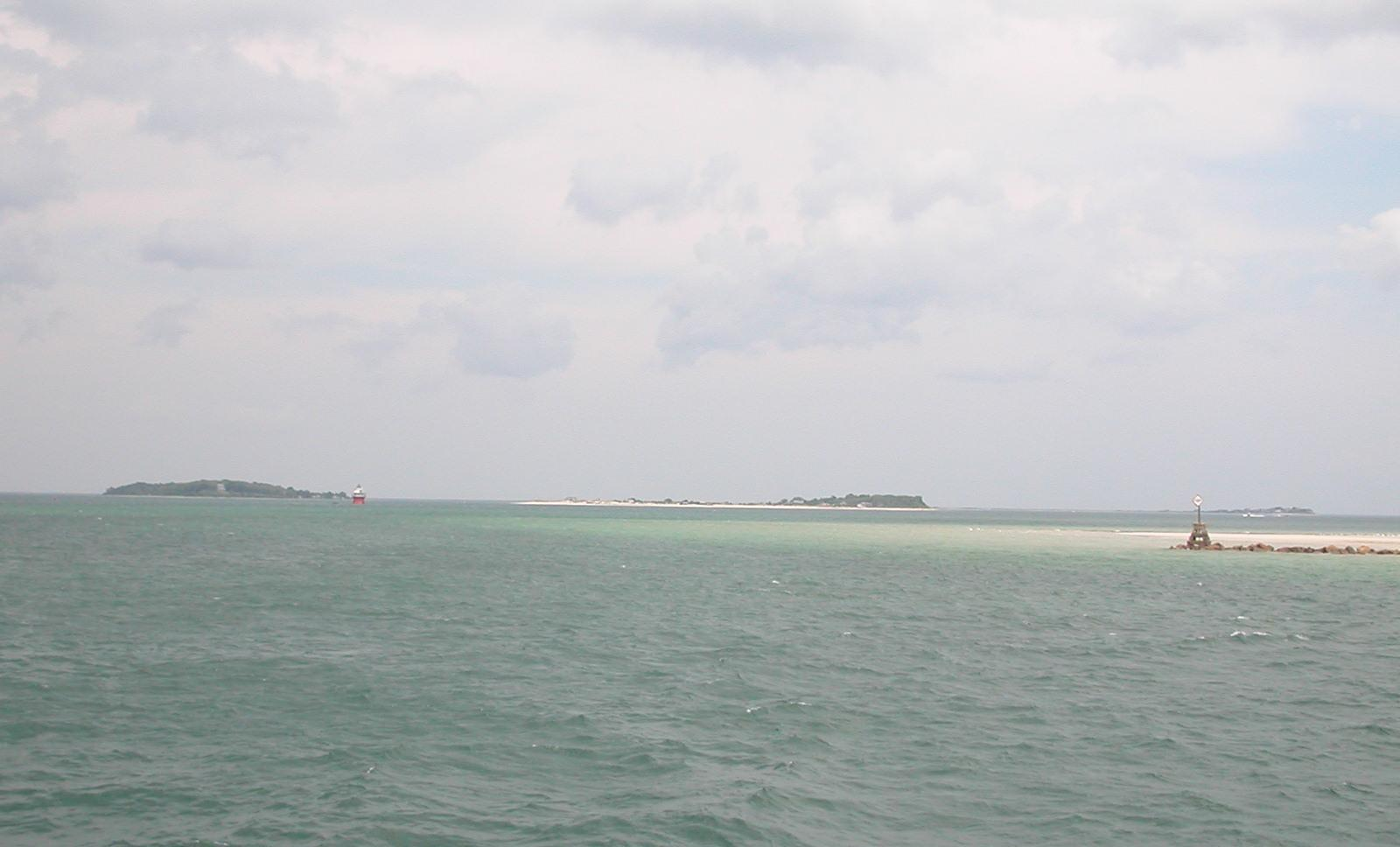
Plymouth Bay, with the tip of Plymouth Beach in the foreground and Clarks Island, Saquish Neck, Gurent Point, and the Duxbury Pier Lighthouse visible in the distance

== Geography ==
Plymouth Bay is an offshoot of the larger Cape Cod Bay and is sometimes considered part of Massachusetts Bay, which is defined by Cape Ann to the north and Cape Cod to the south. Plymouth Bay is also in the southern waters of the Gulf of Maine in the northern Atlantic Ocean. The waters of Plymouth Bay are claimed by three Massachusetts towns, Plymouth in the southern part of the bay, Duxbury in the northern part and Kingston in the westernmost extent of the bay.

Plymouth Bay is dominated by geographical features such as Plymouth Beach, a three-mile barrier beach that protects Plymouth Harbor from the rougher seas of Cape Cod Bay. To the north, Saquish Neck serves as another barrier beach protecting the bay and is almost seven miles in length. Plymouth Beach and Saquish Neck together form a mile wide opening, connecting the bay to the open sea, with boating channels deep enough to sustain moderate boating traffic.

Within Plymouth Bay itself there are considered two smaller bays, Kingston Bay and Duxbury Bay, both in the northern waters of Plymouth Bay, and Warren Cove, in the southern waters of Plymouth Bay, located between Plymouth Beach and Rocky Point.

Several peninsulas define the shoreline of Plymouth Bay such as Rocky Nook, a densely populated coastal area of Kingston, and Powder Point of Duxbury. Plymouth Bay contains one island with year-round inhabitants, Clarks Island, in the northern portion of the bay and is administered by Plymouth. Plymouth Bay also acts as the mouth for several important rivers in the region such as the Jones River in Kingston and the Eel River in Plymouth.

Although used for boating, Plymouth Bay itself is relatively shallow. Depths in the bay will range from 35 feet, in the deepest channels west of Fort Standish, to 6 to 42 inches throughout much of the bay's rolling mud flats.

Most of Plymouth Bay's mud flats can be found in Kingston Bay and Duxbury Bay, which are prone to becoming totally exposed in times of low tide. The largest of these such flats is Ichabod's Flat in Kingston Bay. The mud flats of Kingston Bay are used for shellfishing and clamming and have flourished due to Plymouth Bay's ability to isolate itself from red tide, which occasionally impacts the Massachusetts coastline.

== See also ==
- Plymouth Harbor
- Plymouth Sound, the bay at Plymouth in England.
