= Plymouth Harbor =

Harbor in Plymouth, Massachusetts

Coordinates: 41°58′00″N 70°40′00″W

Plymouth Harbor is a harbor located in Plymouth, a town in the South Shore region of the U.S. state of Massachusetts. It is part of the larger Plymouth Bay. Historically, Plymouth Harbor was the site of anchorage of the Mayflower where the Plymouth Colony pilgrims disembarked in 1620 to establish a permanent settlement at Plymouth.

== Gallery ==
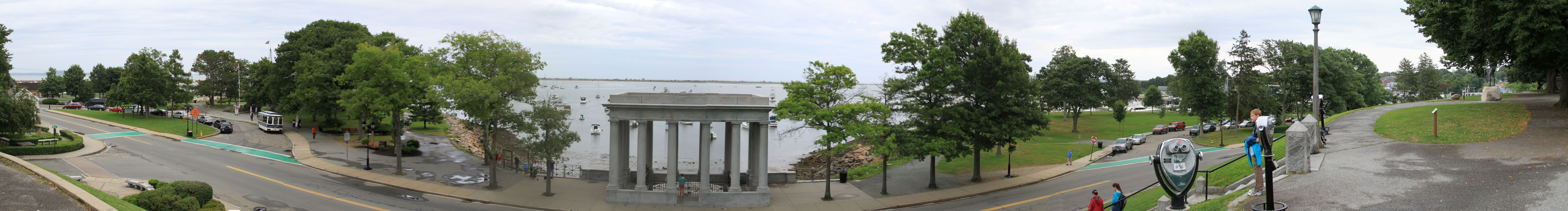
Plymouth Harbor with the Mayflower II (left, behind trees), Plymouth Rock (middle) and Cole's Hill (right) with the Statue of Massasoit

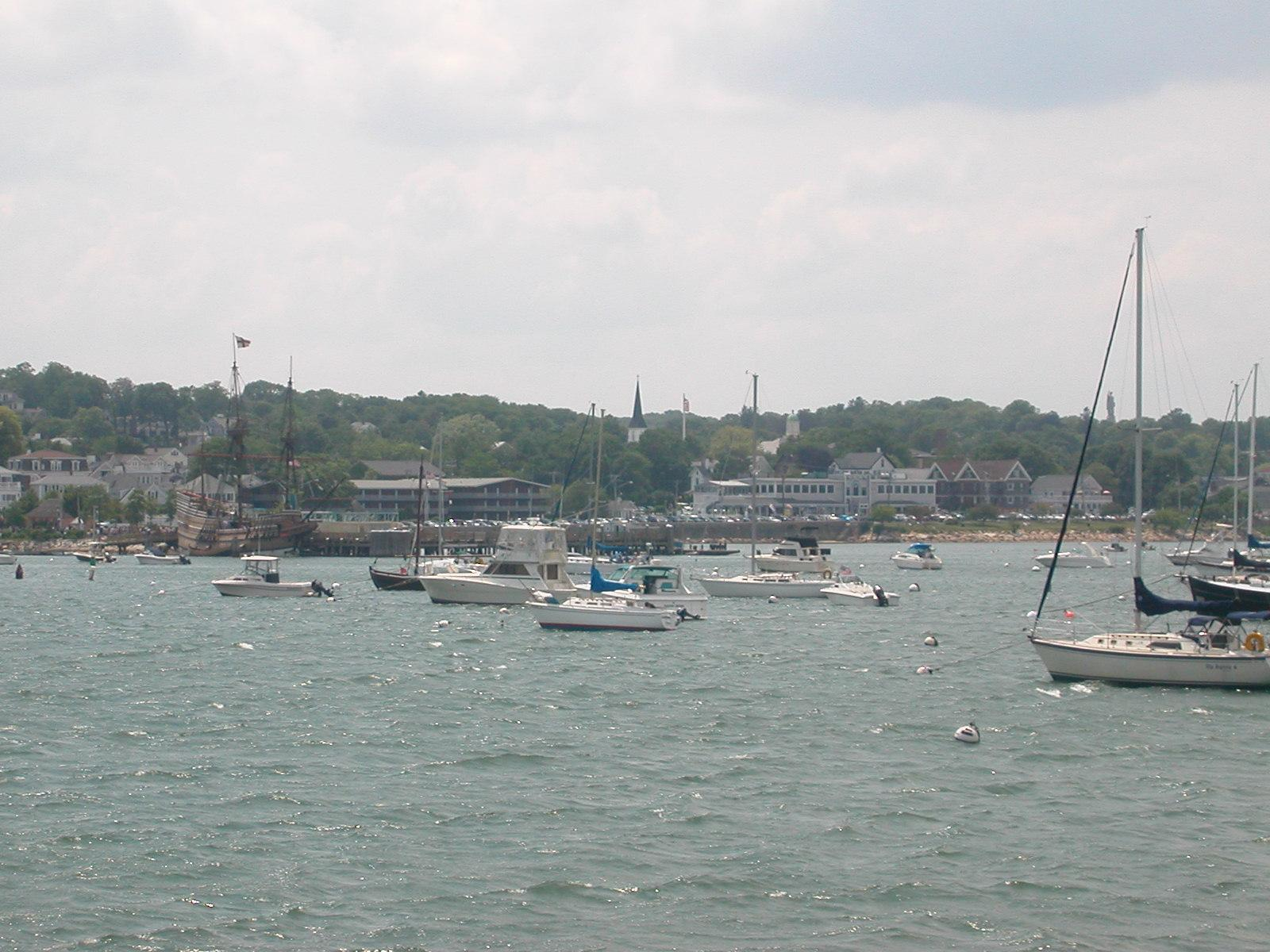
Plymouth Harbor and Downtown Plymouth

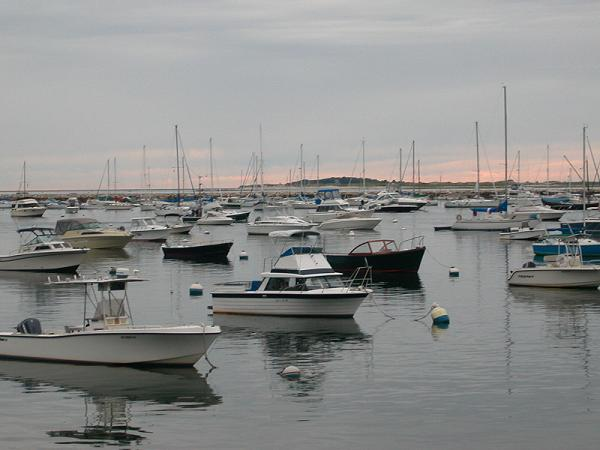
Plymouth Harbor at sunrise

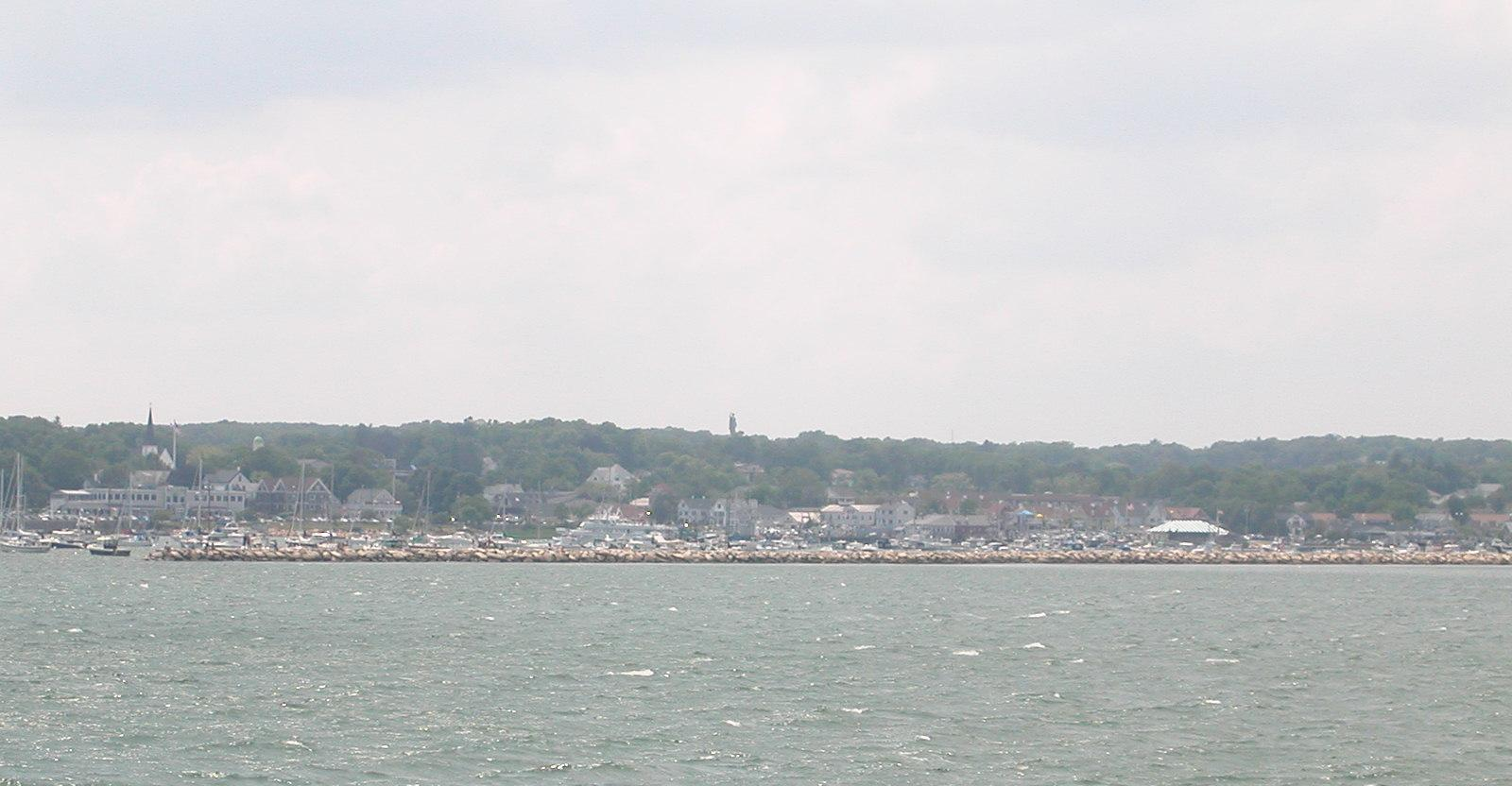
Plymouth Harbor breakwater

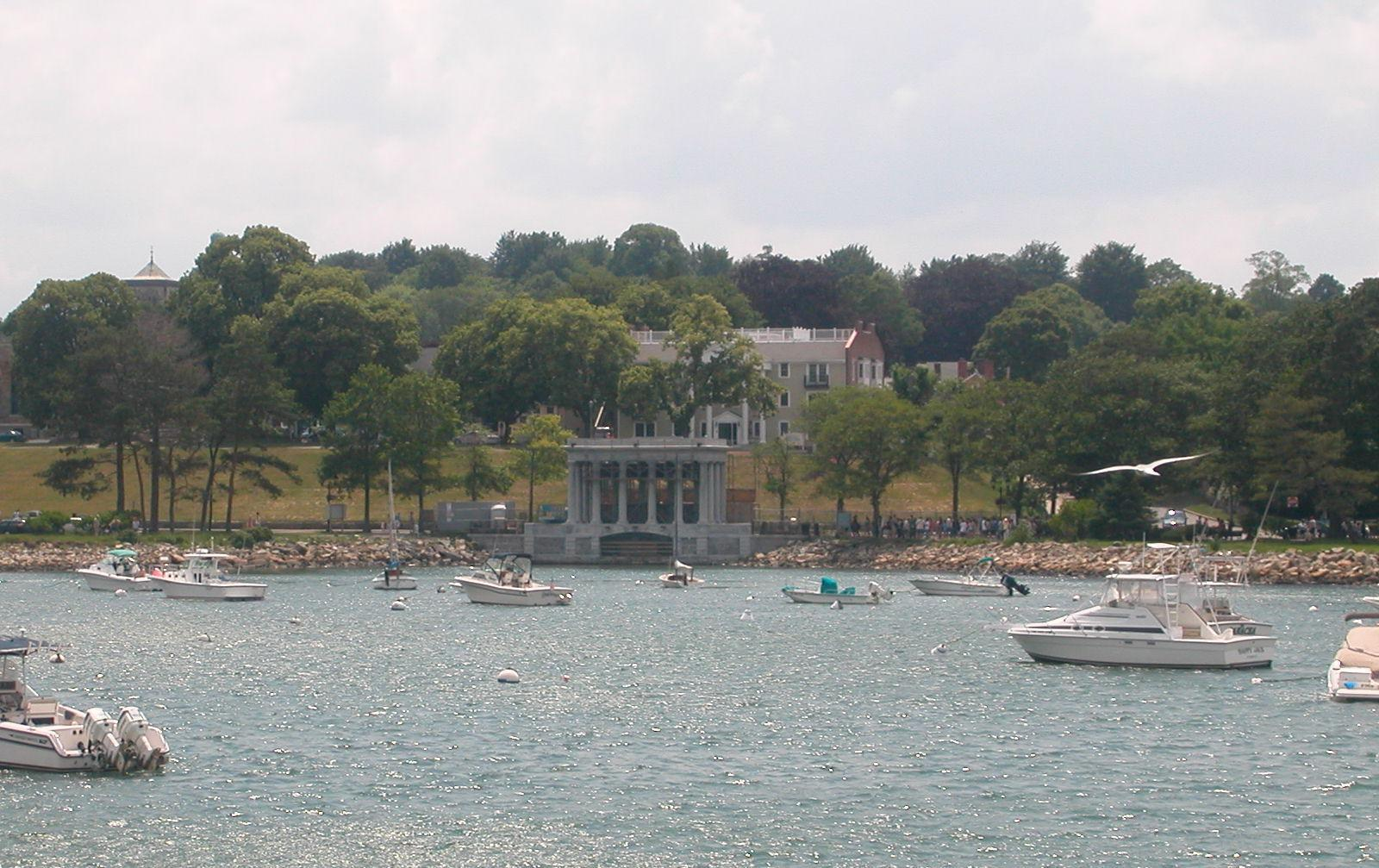
Plymouth Rock from Plymouth Harbor

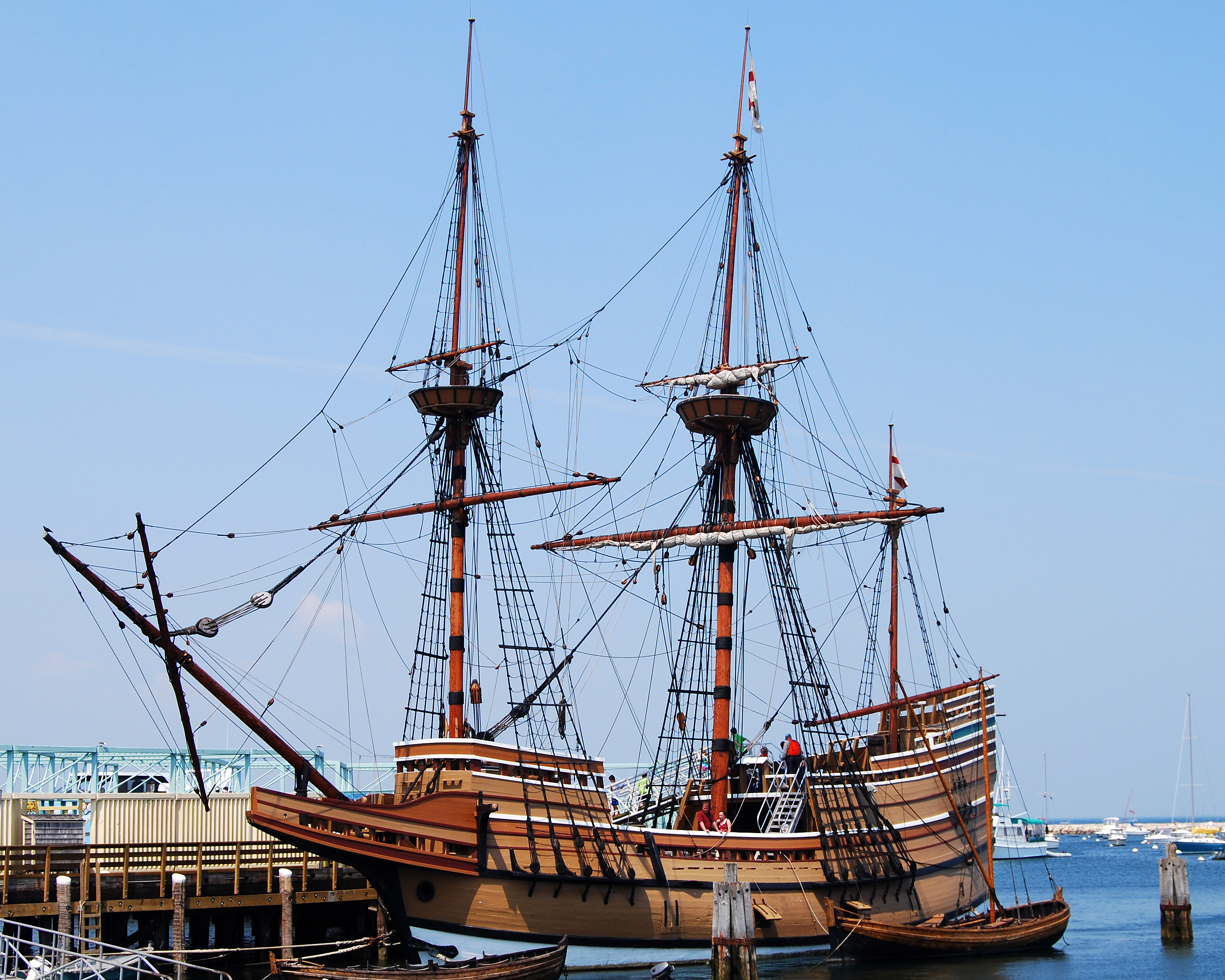
The Mayflower II

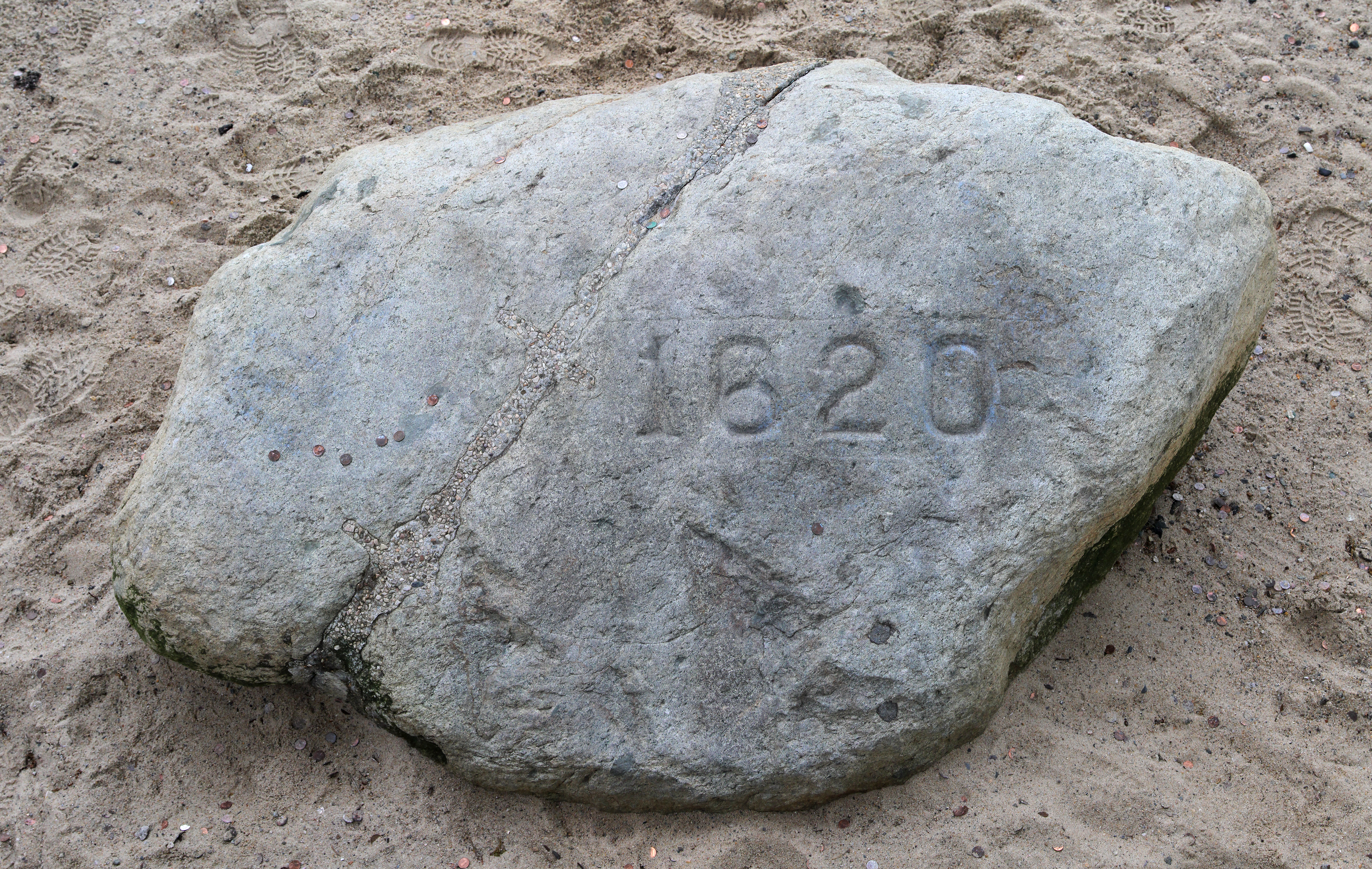
Plymouth Rock, which commemorates the landing of the Mayflower in 1620

== See also ==
- Plymouth Sound
