= Arthur E. Hill =

American chemist and academic (1881–1939)

Arthur Edward Hill (1881–1939) was an American chemist and academic.

== Early life and education ==
Born in Newark, New Jersey, Hill was a descendant of early American settlers, including John and Priscilla Alden who settled in Maine during the seventeenth century. He earned a B.S. degree from New York University in 1901, an M.S. in 1903, and completed a Ph.D. at the University of Freiburg in 1904.

== Career ==
Hill began his academic career at New York University in 1904, eventually becoming a full professor of chemistry. He later served as head of the chemistry department in the graduate school and held leadership roles within the American Chemical Society.

His research primarily dealt with the solubility of gases, liquids, and solids in liquid solvents. He also served as an associate editor for the Journal of the American Chemical Society. During World War I, Hill worked as a chemist for the Chemical Warfare Service in Washington, D.C.

== Personal life ==
Hill was married first to Grace Kent Hill, who died in 1924, and subsequently to Bess Talmadge Hill from 1925 until his death in 1939.
