= Jonathan Alden Sr. =

Plymouth colonist and son of Mayflower immigrants

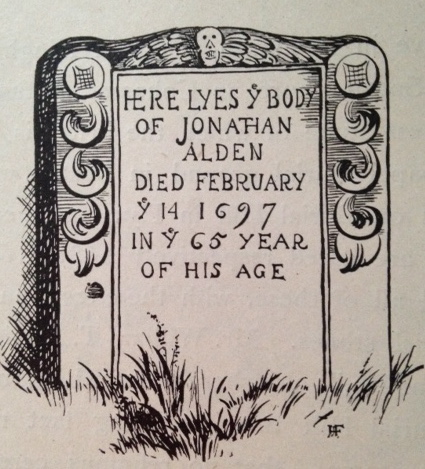
- Jonathan Alden’s gravestone
- Born: c. 1632; Duxbury, Plymouth Colony
- Died: February 14, 1697; Duxbury, Plymouth Colony
- Resting place: Myles Standish Burial Ground
- Occupations: Military officer, farm owner
- Known for: Son of Mayflower immigrants
- Spouse: Abigail Hallet
- Children: 6
- Parents: John Alden (father); Priscilla Mullins (mother)
- Military service
- Force: Plymouth Colony militia
- Rank: Captain
- Unit: Duxbury company
- Conflict: King Philip's War (1675-1678)

Capt. Jonathan Alden Sr. (c. 1632 – February 14, 1697), the son of Mayflower settlers, was a military officer and farm owner in Plymouth Colony. The home he built in the late 1600s is now a National Historic Landmark in Duxbury, Massachusetts.

== Early life ==
Jonathan Alden was born c. 1632 in the seaside town of Duxbury (Note: Early spellings of Duxbury include Ducksburrow, Duxburrough, Duxburough, and Duxburrow.) in Plymouth Colony. He was the fifth of ten children born to John Alden (c. 1598–1687) and Priscilla Mullins (c. 1602–c. 1685), who both arrived on the historic 1620 voyage of the Mayflower. John Alden, a cooper by trade, was a member of the Mayflower's crew and Priscilla Mullins was a passenger.

In 1627, about five years before Jonathan Alden's birth, John Alden was granted 169 acres along the Bluefish River in Duxbury, where he built a home near Eagletree Pond. John and Priscilla Alden raised all of their children on their Duxbury farm.

== Civic and military service ==
Jonathan Alden was made a freeman in 1657. He was asked to survey land and provide a report to the court about routes for a highway in 1685. In 1689, he was elected a selectman for the town of Duxbury.

Alden had a long career in Plymouth Colony's military force. In 1658, at the age of 26, he was made an ensign in the Duxbury company. In the same year, the colony's forces were placed under the command of Major Josiah Winslow. About 17 years later, Alden fought under Winslow in King Philip's War (1675-1678). In 1681, Alden was made a lieutenant and, in 1689, he was made a captain of the Duxbury company.

== Alden house ==
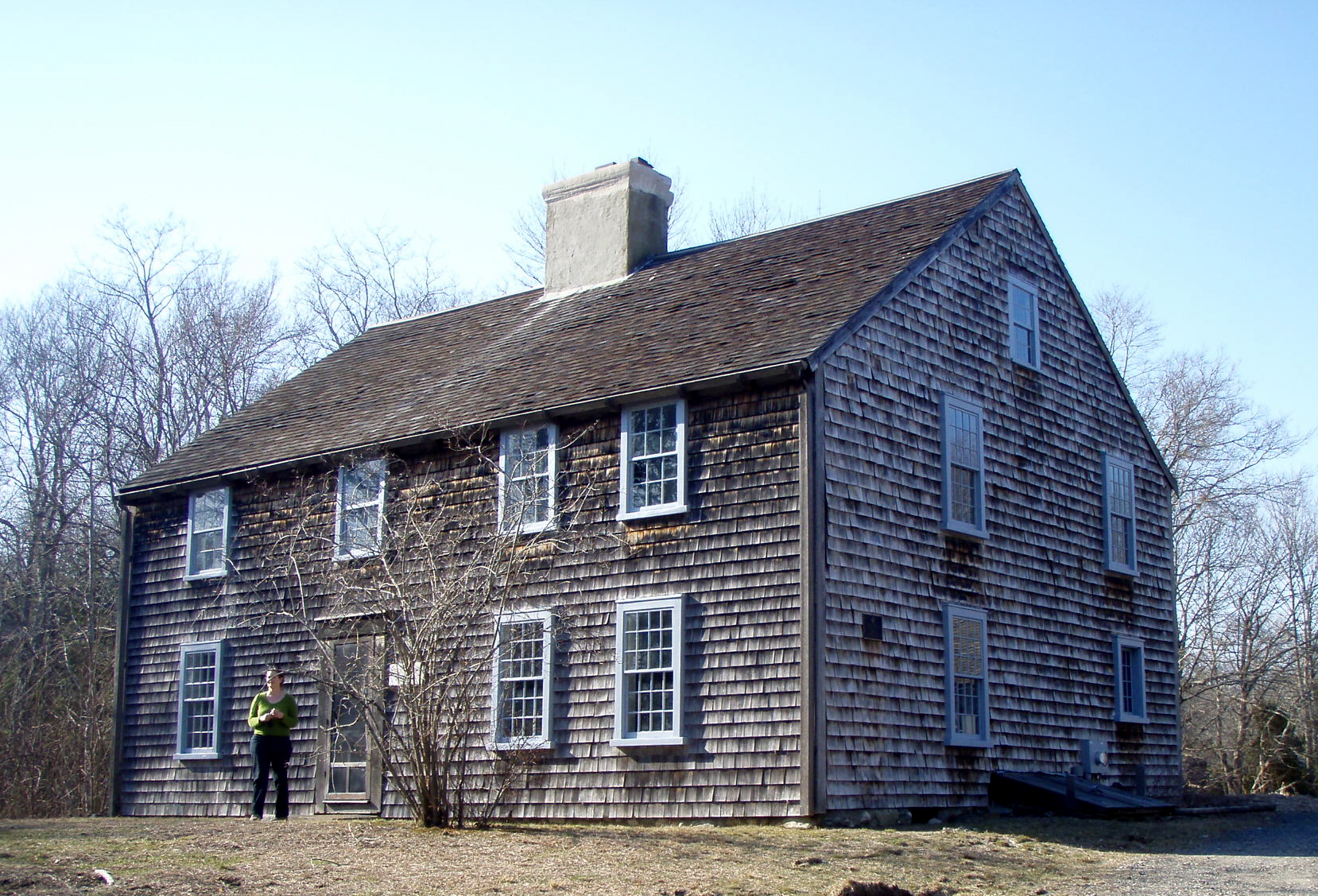
Alden House in Duxbury, Massachusetts

The Alden family built two homes on the original 1627 grant in Duxbury. The first home—the childhood home of Jonathan Alden and his siblings—was built in 1632 at Eagletree Pond and demolished sometime before 1687. Its foundation was discovered in 1960 by archeologist Roland W. Robbins. The second Alden home was constructed 100 yards away and is now a museum at the Alden House Historic Site. The older, east side of the present home, which includes the great room and master chamber, was built by Jonathan Alden in the late 1600s. Recent research suggests it was constructed about the time of Alden's marriage in 1672, while tradition asserts it was built in 1653. Timbers in the west side of the home were erected in the early 1700s when it was owned by his son John Alden (c. 1681–1739).

== Family ==
Jonathan Alden's brother John Alden Jr. (c. 1626–1702) was convicted and imprisoned for witchcraft in the Salem witch trials in 1692. His sister Elisabeth Alden (1623–1717) allegedly was the first child of European parents to be born in New England.

At the age of 40, Jonathan Alden married Abigail Hallett (c. 1644–1725), daughter of Andrew Hallett, on December 10, 1672. They had six children in Duxbury: Elizabeth, Anna, Sarah, John, Andrew, and Jonathan Jr.

== Death and tribute ==
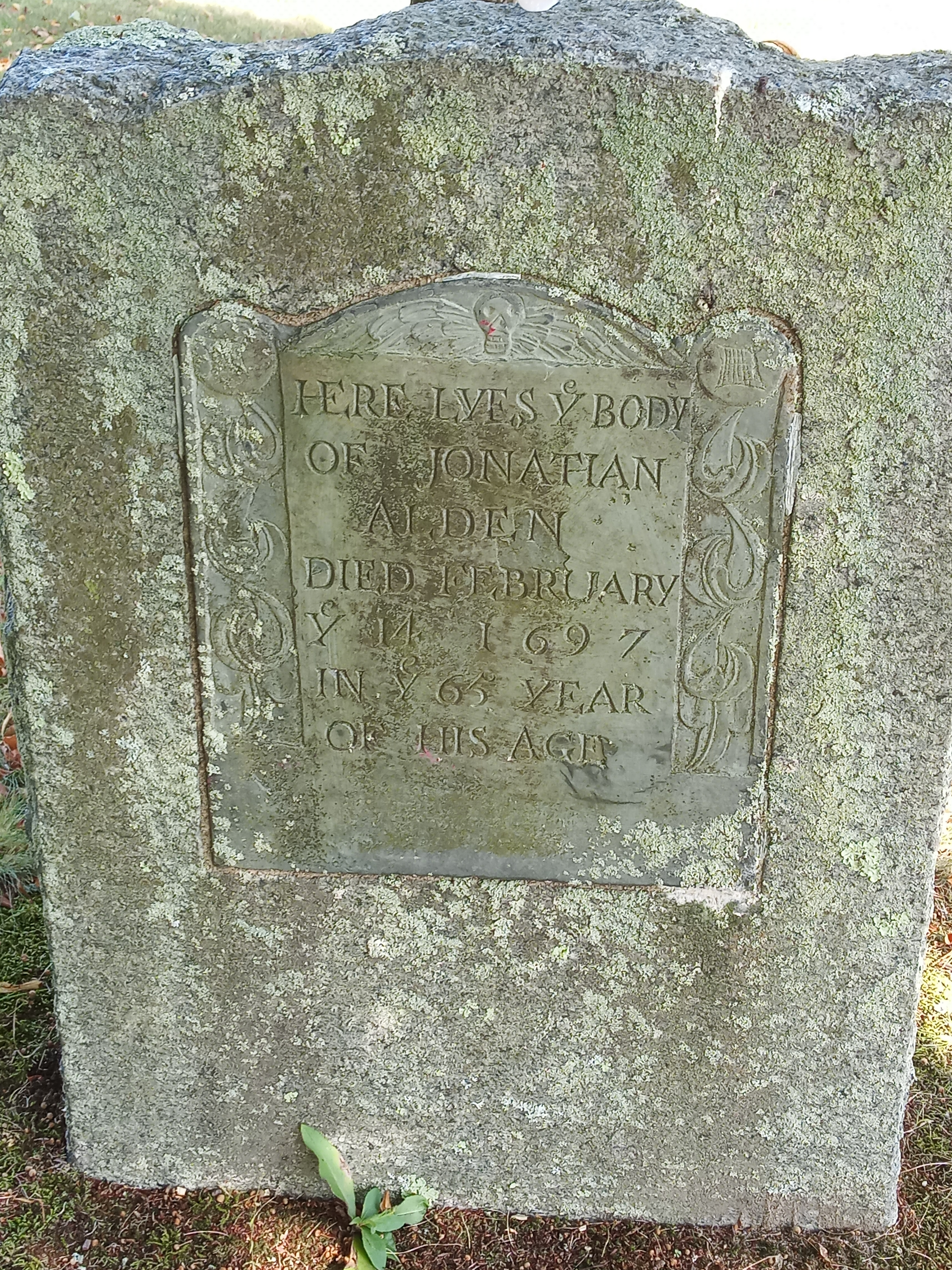
Gravestone of Jonathan Alden in Duxbury, MA

Jonathan Alden died on February 14, 1697, in Duxbury, leaving an estate of £309 (equivalent to US$64,580 in 2025). He was given a military funeral and "buried under arms." He was interred near his parents in Myles Standish Burial Ground, the oldest maintained cemetery in the United States.

The funeral sermon was delivered by Rev. Ichabod Wiswall: (Note: This quotation is abbreviated according to the source.)

Neighbours and friends, we are assembled this day in a posture of mourning, to solemnize the funeral of the present deceased, to pay our last tribute of respect to a person well known among us. I need not enlarge upon his character, but, in brief, am bold to say thus much. He stepped over his youth, without the usual stains of vanity. In his riper years he approved himself a good Commonwealth's man; and, which is the crown of all, a sincere Christian, one whose heart was in the house of God, even when his body was barred hence by the restraints of many difficulties, which confined him at home. He could say, in truth, Lord, I have loved the habitation of thy house. He earnestly desired the enlargement of Jerusalem, and inwardly lamented that the ways to Zion did mourn, because so few did flock to her solemn feasts; but is now united to that general assembly, where is no more cause of sorrow on that account.
As to his quality in our militia, he was a leader, and I dare say rather loved than feared of his company.
Fellow Soldiers, you are come to lay your leader in the dust, to lodge him in his quiet and solemn repose. You are no more to follow him in the field. No sound of rallying drum, nor shrillest trumpet will awaken him, till the general muster, when the Son of God will cause that trumpet to be blown, whose echoes shall shake the foundations of the heavens and the earth, and raise the dead.
Fellow Soldiers, you have followed him into the field, appeared in your arms, stood your ground, marched, countermarched, made ready, advanced, fired, and retreated; and all at his command. You have been conformable to his military commands and postures, and it is to your credit. But, let me tell you, this day he has acted one posture before your eyes, and you are all at a stand! No man stirs a foot after him! But the day is hastening, wherein you must all conform to his present posture, I mean, be laid in the dust.
Fellow Soldiers, oh consider how dreadful it will prove, if, after you have with a matchless bravery of spirit acted the part of soldiers on earth, you should in the meantime forget your Christian armor and discipline, and be numbered among those mentioned in Ezek. xxxii. 26, 27, who, having been the terror of the mighty in the land of the living, yet went down to hell with their weapons of war, their iniquities remaining upon their bones which that you may all escape, follow your deceased leader, as he followed Christ; and then though death may for a short space of time tyrannize over your frail bodies in the grave, yet you shall rise with him in triumph, when the great trumpet shall sound, and appear listed in the muster roll of the Prince of the earth, the Captain of our eternal salvation.

In the early 1800s, Ezra Weston IV, who had restored tombstones in the Myles Standish Burial Ground, found the broken tombstone of Jonathan Alden and took it home where it remained for thirty years. In 1880, it came into the possession of Lucia Alden Bradford. Her nephew, Lawrence Bradford, searched the burial ground and found the original broken base that matched the bottom edge of the tombstone. The original tombstone—the oldest extant carved gravestone in the cemetery—is now preserved in a stone frame on that spot.
