= The Courtship of Miles Standish (1923 film) =

1923 film by Frederic Richard Sullivan

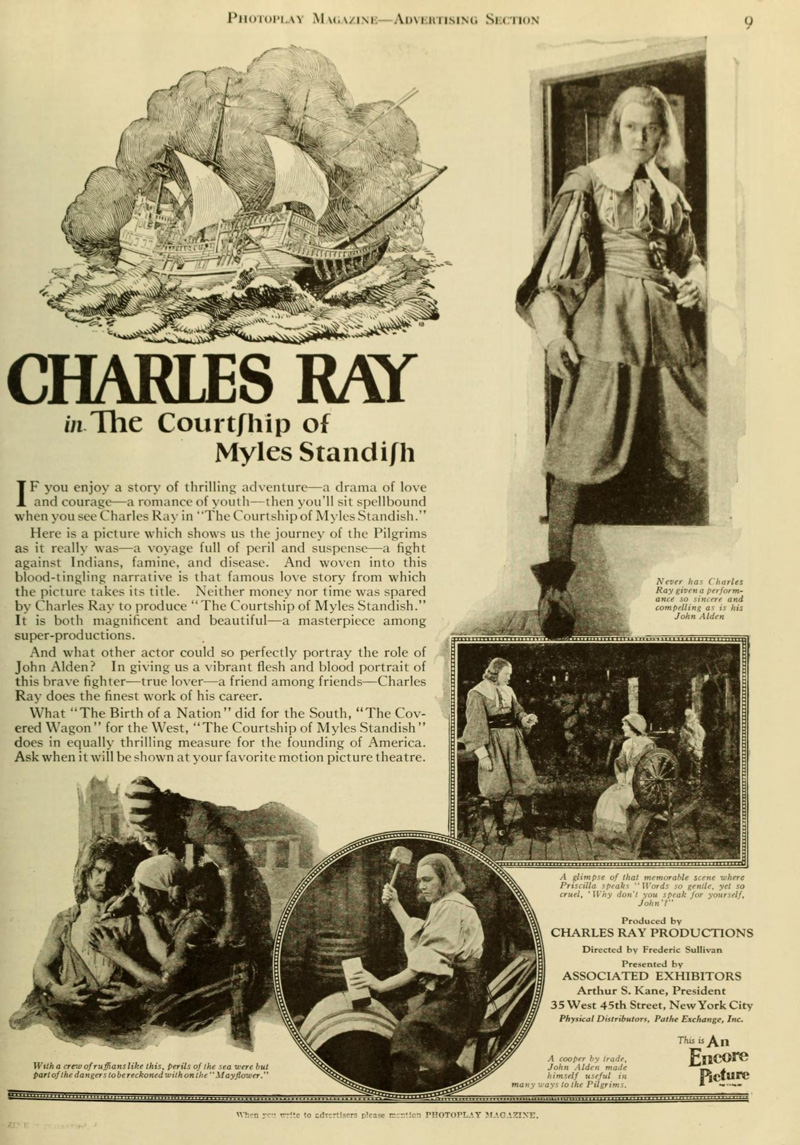
- Contemporary magazine advertisement
- Directed by: Frederic Sullivan
- Written by: Albert Ray
- Based on: The Courtship of Miles Standish by Henry Wadsworth Longfellow
- Starring: Charles Ray; Enid Bennett; E. Alyn Warren
- Cinematography: George Rizard
- Production company: Charles Ray Producing
- Distributed by: Associated Exhibitors
- Release date: December 30, 1923
- Running time: 90 minutes
- Country: United States
- Languages: Silent; English intertitles

The Courtship of Miles Standish, also known as The Courtship of Myles Standish, is a 1923 American silent epic historical romantic drama film about Myles Standish produced by and starring Charles Ray, Enid Bennett, and E. Alyn Warren. Directed by Frederic Sullivan, nephew of the famous composer Sir Arthur Sullivan, and scripted by Albert Ray, the film is based on Henry Wadsworth Longfellow's 1858 poem The Courtship of Miles Standish. No prints of the film are known to exist and it is now presumed lost.

== Background and production ==
Actor Charles Ray had risen to fame in the mid to late 1910s playing young, wholesome fun country bumpkins in silent comedy films directed by Thomas H. Ince for Paramount Pictures. By 1920, Ray was earning $11,000 a week (approximately $177,000 today). He left Paramount in 1920 after Adolph Zukor reportedly refused to give him a substantial raise, and formed his own production company, Charles Ray Productions. The company produced several fairly successful comedy films from 1920 to 1922, several of which were written by (and featured assistant direction from) Albert Ray, Charles Ray's first cousin.

By 1922, Ray had grown tired of playing country bumpkin roles and decided to reinvent himself as a dramatic actor in romantic leading man roles. Against the advice of producers and friends, Ray chose to make a historical epic costume drama based on Henry Wadsworth Longfellow's 1858 narrative poem The Courtship of Miles Standish.

After failing to secure financial backing from a major studio, Ray put up $500,000 of his own money to fund the project. The scenario for the film, taken from Longfellow's poem, was written by Albert Ray, with direction by Frederic Sullivan (although all creative decisions on the film rested entirely with Charles Ray himself).

The film was shot in part at the Charles Ray Studio located on Sunset Boulevard (now known as the KCET Studios) in Los Angeles which Ray purchased shortly after leaving Paramount in 1920. On one of the studio's stages, Ray had a 180-ton rocking replica of the Mayflower built that cost a reported $65,000 (approximately $1,228,000 today). Other sequences were shot in Lake Arrowhead, California where Ray had three full sized log cabins built solely for exterior shots. By the end of filming, Ray had spent over $1 million of his own money and the film's budget reportedly rose to a reported $3 million (approximately $56,689,000 today).

== Cast ==
- Charles Ray as John Alden
- Enid Bennett as Priscilla Mullens
- E. Alyn Warren as Myles Standish
- Joseph Dowling as Elder Brewster
- Sam De Grasse as John Carver
- Norval MacGregor as William Bradford
- Thomas Holding as Edward Winslow
- Frank Farrington as Isaac Allerton
- Billy Sullivan as John Howland
- Camilla Johnson as Little girl
- Adamae Vaughn unidentified role

== Reception ==
Upon its release, The Courtship of Miles Standish received some favorable reviews from critics, but was not well received by audiences. Frederick James Smith described the film as "merely dull" and that "the acting is not much." Smith wrote, "Ray seems oppressed by the historical significance of John, and he allots himself entirely too much film. Enid Bennett makes Priscilla a simpering and almost insufferable ingenue." The film was a box office failure, losing $1 million and effectively ruining Charles Ray's career. Ray's production company went bankrupt and he was forced to declare personal bankruptcy. For his part, Frederic Sullivan never directed another film.

Ray's career would never rebound from the failure of The Courtship of Miles Standish. He continued acting, but appeared in smaller budget productions, in supporting roles. During the sound era, Ray appeared in bit parts and filed for bankruptcy a second time in 1934. He died of a systemic infection in November 1943.
