= Wiswall =

Wiswall is a surname. Notable people with the surname include:

- Frank L. Wiswall (1895–1972), American lawyer, horse-racing executive and politician
- Ichabod Wiswall (1637–1700), Congregationalist minister in British America
- Peleg Wiswall (1762–1836), Canadian lawyer, judge and politician
- Thomas Wiswall (1601–1683), settler of British America
