= Ichabod Wiswall =

Reverend Ichabod Wiswall (1637–1700) was the third pastor of the church in Duxbury, Plymouth Colony, British America. Though he is thought to have given the first known funeral sermon in British America at the burial of Capt. Jonathan Alden in 1697, American funeral sermons do predate this event, by several decades.

== Biography ==
Wiswall was the son of Thomas Wiswall (1601–1683) and Elizabeth Berbage. The third of ten children, he was born in Dorchester, Massachusetts, on 3 June 1637.

Wiswall matriculated into Harvard University in 1654, at 17 years of age. During his time of study at Harvard, the course of study was changed from three years to four years. Wiswall left Harvard in 1657, after only three years, thereby forfeiting the honor of being able to claim himself as an alumnus of that institution. Beginning on 7 March 1656, Wiswall served for at least three years as a teacher in the public school at Dorchester.

He married Priscilla Pabodie (1653–1724). Priscilla was the daughter of Elizabeth Pabodie, and the granddaughter of Mayflower passengers John Alden and Priscilla Alden. He employed himself at sea as a deck officer on a merchantman trading "from the eastern shore to Barbados." and later in the ongoing fisheries enterprise of the late Ferdinando Gorges off the coast of Arrowic, Maine where he met his bride.

Wiswall later studied for the ministry, and was ordained as minister of the church in Duxbury in 1676. From 1676 until his death in 1700, Wiswall served as the third minister of the church in Duxbury, Massachusetts.

In 1689, Wiswall travelled to London to petition for a new royal charter for the Plymouth Colony. There he encountered Reverend Increase Mather, a fellow resident of Dorchester, but one who favored a charter which united the Massachusetts Bay and Plymouth colonies. Their opposing efforts ultimately resulted in the 1692 charter, which established the Province of Massachusetts Bay (now the Commonwealth of Massachusetts), merging the two colonies.

In 1697, Wiswall officiated at the burial of Capt. Jonathan Alden, son of famous Pilgrims John and Priscilla Alden. This ceremony was conducted in Duxbury, Massachusetts. While Duxbury records claim that Wiswall's sermon at this event was the first known funeral sermon in British America, other funeral sermons (including James Fitch's sermon on the death of Anne Mason (Norwich, CT, 1672)) predate Wiswall's sermon by a quarter century. Wiswall himself would be buried in the same cemetery, three years later; he died on 23 July 1700. Wiswall's tombstone is located close to that of Myles Standish, in what is now known as the Myles Standish Burial Ground in Duxbury, Massachusetts.

== Notable relatives ==
- Wiswall's father, Thomas Wiswall (1601–1683), was a prominent early citizen of the Massachusetts Bay Colony and settler of Cambridge Village, Massachusetts.
- Wiswall's brother, Captain Noah Wiswall (1638–1690), was killed in battle at Wheelwright Pond at Lee, New Hampshire, during events leading up to the Battle of Quebec during King William's War on July 6, 1690.
- Noah Wiswall (1699–1786), grandson of Noah Wiswall (1638–1690). In 1775, at 76 years of age, he marched 28 miles from Newton to Lexington, where he was wounded at the Battle of Lexington.
- Jeremiah Wiswall (1725–1809), Captain, East Newton Company of Minutemen, Concord and Dorchester, American Revolutionary War. He was the son of Noah (1699–1786), and was his commander on the battlefield.
