= John Alden (sailor) =

Convicted in the Salem witch trials

John Alden Jr.
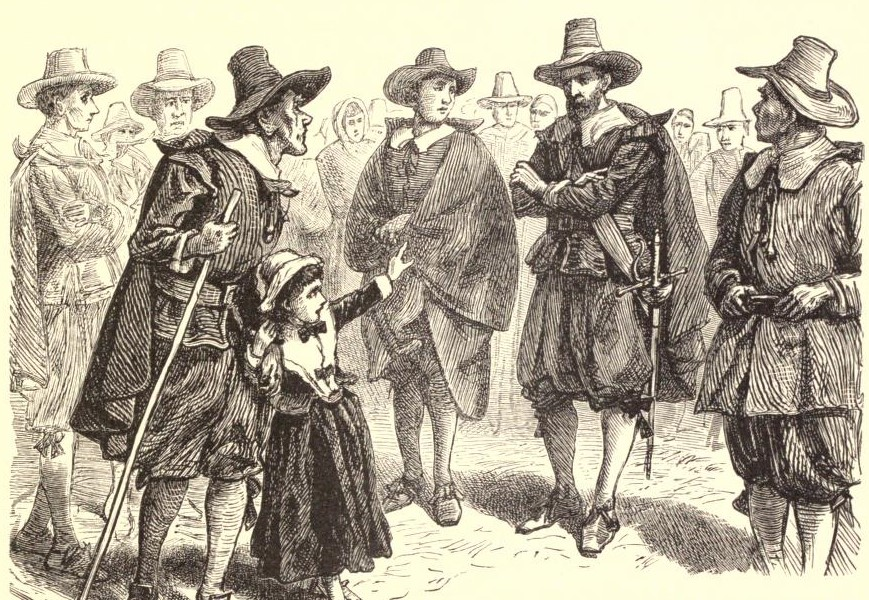
- "Captain Alden Denounced" from an 1878 history, depicting the accusation of John Alden, Jr. during the Salem Witch Trials
- Born: c. 1626 or 1627 (before June 1, 1627 [O.S. May 22, 1627]); Plymouth Colony
- Died: March 25, 1702 [O.S. March 14, 1701] Province of Massachusetts Bay
- Occupations: Shipmaster, merchant, soldier, politician, sailor
- Known for: Written account of the Salem witch trials, survivor of the same
- Spouses: Phyllis Carver (died young); Elizabeth Phillips Everill
- Children: 14
- Parent(s): John Alden; Priscilla Alden (née Mullins)

Capt. John Alden Jr. (ca. 1626 or 1627 – March 25, 1702 [O.S. March 14, 1701] (Note: His gravestone, which used the Julian calendar and the Annunciation Style of enumerating years with dual dating, recorded his death as having occurred on March 14, 1701/2: "Here lyeth y^{e} body of John Alden Senio^{r} aged 75 years deceased March y^{e} 14 170^{1}/_{2}". See also Old Style and New Style dates.)) was a Colonial soldier, politician, merchant, and sailor born in the Plymouth Colony. He was a well-known public figure in his time; however, he is currently chiefly remembered as a survivor of the Salem witch trials, of which he wrote a much quoted and studied account.

== Personal life ==
John Alden Jr. was the first son of John Alden and Priscilla Alden (née Mullins), who settled in Plymouth Colony (present-day Plymouth, Massachusetts) in 1620, arriving on the Pilgrim ship Mayflower. He was born in Plymouth in about 1626 or 1627. He and his older sister Elizabeth are listed in the records of the division of cattle among the residents of Plymouth, which occurred on June 1, 1627 [O.S. May 22, 1627]. The family later moved across the harbor to form Duxbury when John was very small, as the terms of settlement set by the financial backers of Plymouth Colony in London had changed and the settlers were free to spread out as they wished. (Of these, Duxbury was one of the first settlements after Plymouth.)

He was a sea captain, a merchant in Boston, and a charter member of Rev. Samuel Willard's Old South Meeting House and Third Church in Boston; over time, he became a prominent member of society within early Boston as evidenced by the many documents in the state archives recording his activities, as well as information on the large house he occupied. There is evidence that he may have participated in King Philip's War as a young man and as the son of John Alden, a major commander in the war and a prominent member of society in both Plymouth and Duxbury. Later in life, he held a military command during King William's War and was involved in the Naval battle off St. John (1691). He married Elizabeth Phillips Everill in 1660 and they had twelve children, some from a prior marriage:

- John Alden III, born 20 November 1660, died young
- Elizabeth Alden, born 9 May 1662, died 14 July 1662
- John Alden IV, born 12 March 1663, had issue, became a sailor like his father
- William Alden I, born 10 March 1664, died young
- Elizabeth Alden, born 9 April 1665, had issue
- William Alden II, born 5 March 1666, died young
- Zachariah Alden, born 8 March 1667, died young
- William Alden III, born 10 September 1669, had issue
- Nathaniel Alden, born 1670, had issue
- Zachariah Alden, born 18 February 1673, had issue
- Nathan Alden, born 17 October 1677, died young
- Sarah Alden, born 27 September 1681, died young

Alden Jr. died on March 25, 1702 [O.S. March 14, 1701] in what was then the Province of Massachusetts Bay. His gravestone reads "Here lyeth y^{e} body of John Alden Senio^{r} aged 75 years deceased March y^{e} 14 170^{1}/_{2}" ("Senio^{r}" in this context indicates that he was himself father of a third John Alden). The stone is preserved at the portico of the present Old South Church in Boston after having been discovered during excavations where it had been dumped after the removal of the graves.

== Scandals and Salem witch trials ==
Aside from the witch trials, Alden was involved in a number of scandals and controversies, which featured heavily in the accusations against him for witchcraft. The only one to bring much modern attention, however, occurred in Salem when he stopped there on his return home from Quebec, where he had gone in February 1692 to ransom New England settlers captured in the Candlemas attack on York, Maine. According to the Massachusetts state archives, he had been involved in several exchanges of this type over the years; this fed mightily into controversies about the man as another piece of gossip that surrounded him was that he sold weapons to the enemy for personal profit, including Native American tribes like the Wabanaki, allies of the French in 1692. This was a time period in which colonization of Northern New England was a battlefield between Puritans, the French, and their Native American allies with high casualties, violent skirmishes, and several raids on each other. It began with King Philip's War and would not be completely over until the French and Indian War, with Great Britain defeating France after their victories at Quebec and Montreal; the French and Indian War removed France as a threat to the New Englanders and made the French alliance with the existing tribes irrelevant.

Upon arriving in Salem Village, Alden knew nothing of the troubles of Salem but rather had the misfortune of having his son, also named John, taken as part of the prisoner exchange. Due to his father having been accused of witchcraft, and thus unable to return to Quebec to bargain, John Alden IV was taken to the Bastille in France, whence he would not return for almost a decade. Alden also didn't know that one of the accusers, one of the "afflicted", was Mercy Lewis. She was orphaned in the latter half of 1689 in Casco Bay, Maine, during a raid on her village. Historians have speculated that she had an ulterior motive in accusing Alden, a desire for revenge on those she felt had failed to protect her family. Alden's second wife, Elizabeth, had ties to Maine as her father was a wealthy lumber merchant, a business he inherited through marriage. He was a perfect target. He was subsequently accused and convicted of witchcraft during the Salem witch trials in May 1692. At the time of his trial, Salem's jail was already full, so he was carted off to Boston. In the coming weeks of incarceration, he had been inclined not to make much of the matter, but was prevailed upon by some friends and broke out of jail, fleeing in the night on horseback. It was mid-September and his decision to run away proved wise, as evidenced by the fact that Giles Corey was crushed to death within a few days of his departure. Per some sources it is said he escaped to New York, but more likely Alden escaped south to Duxbury, his hometown in his youth and the location of many of his relatives, namely his younger brothers David and Jonathan and a very large number of nieces and nephews still living in the town. According to the oldest traditions, when, having awakened his family in the dead of night and causing much alarm, he said in a terrified voice that he was "flying from the Devil, and the Devil was after him."

Alden remained hidden with friends and family, until, as he later said, "the public had reclaimed the use of its reason". When he returned to Boston nearly a year later, he was cleared by proclamation. The authorities do not seem to have searched for him with any diligence; one of the judges, Samuel Sewall, an old friend, is known to have expressed doubts about his guilt, and attended a prayer service at Alden's house in the hope of receiving guidance. As with many other accused and hanged, other judges remained unrepentant to the last, and John Hathorne – who was one of the three judges that presided over Alden's case – went down in history as the "Hanging Judge" because so few escaped the noose when he presided, which makes Alden's story all the more valuable.

=== Narrative ===
His vivid first-hand narrative of the witchcraft trials was later published by Robert Calef in More Wonders of the Invisible World, and the transcript from his trial still survives. During the crisis in Salem, Alden would have been a man in his sixties. By this point in his life, he had been a well-respected and eminent man in Boston for many years, as far as can be determined. He was an honest tradesman who bent but did not break the rules. He had no contact with any of the girls prior to late May 1692 and most of his personal life was centered in Boston, not Salem. Alden recounts the bizarre behavior of the girls where they would at one moment be catatonic and then another moment would go into fits simply because he had looked at them. He questioned the judges why it was that whenever he looked at them in the eyes, nothing happened. He had his sword taken from him, because the girls said it was an object of witchcraft. He was at some point asked to go outside in the sunlight so the girls could see his face better, and the girls were perfectly capable of walking out before convulsing. The overall tone of the text suggests Alden's thoughts on the matter were that the town had gone stark raving mad: two of the three judges on the court were completely convinced by the girls' antics. He relates how he appealed to his friend Bartholomew Gedney, the third judge, to clear his character; Gedney replied coldly that he had always looked on Alden as an honest man, but now must alter his opinion. Alden said that he hoped in time to change Gedney's opinion again: unlike another socially prominent eyewitness, Nathaniel Cary, Alden never cast doubt on the judges' integrity, although he referred to the afflicted girls with contempt as "juggling wenches". As he noted, much of their alleged evidence against him – such as claims that he sold whiskey to the Indians and had Indian wives and children – was simply gossip which they had presumably picked up from their parents.

== Fiction ==
John Alden was played by Shane West (as Captain John Alden) in the 2014 TV series Salem.
