= Elizabeth Pabodie =

First settler born in New England (1623–1717)

- Born: Elizabeth Alden; 1623; Plymouth Colony
- Died: 31 May 1717 (aged 94); Little Compton, Rhode Island
- Known for: Allegedly first white child born in New England
- Parent(s): John Alden, Priscilla Alden

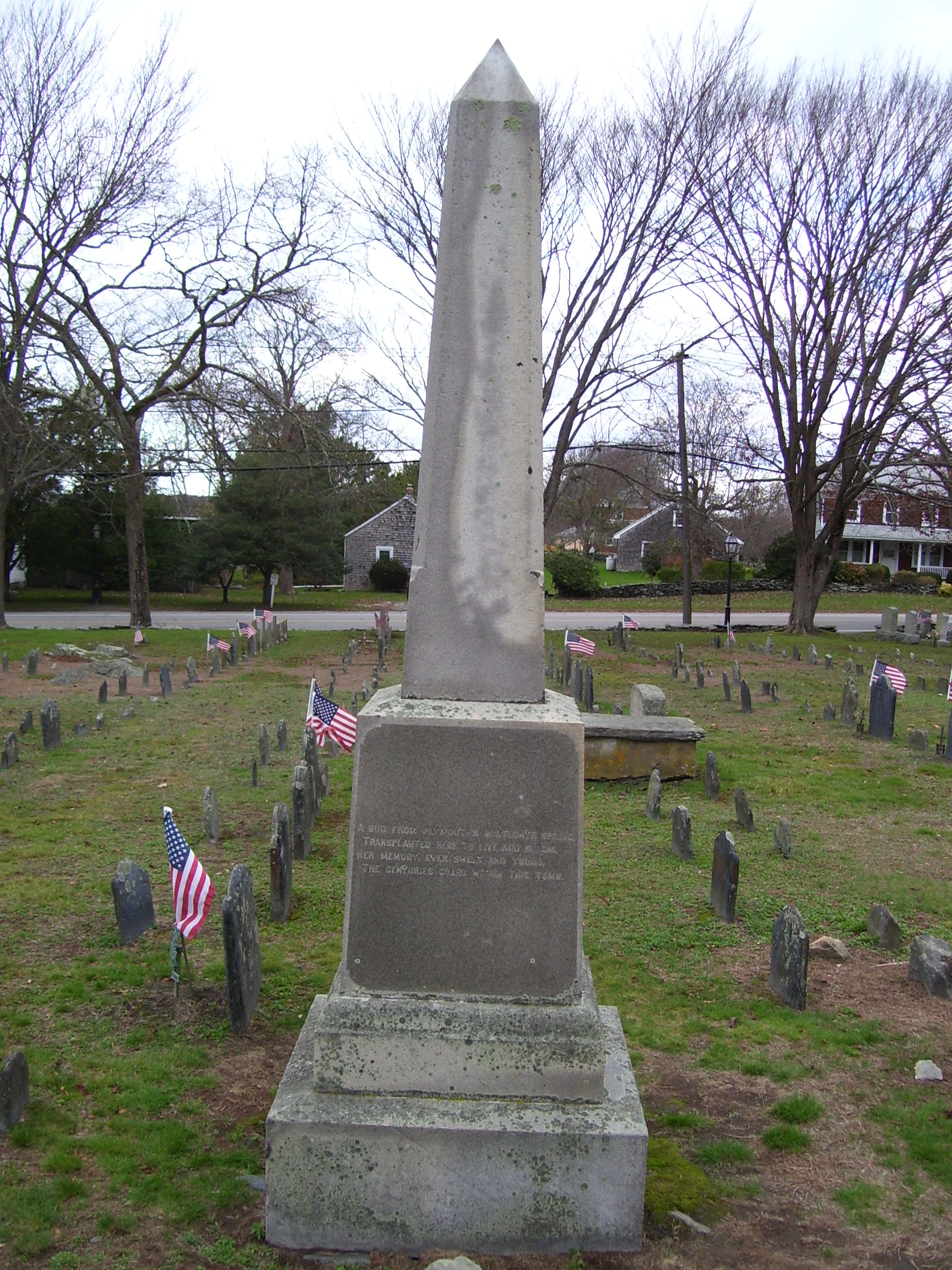
Elisabeth Alden Pabodie's grave in Little Compton, Rhode Island, the original headstone was inserted in a new monument in 1882

Elizabeth Pabodie (née Alden; 1623–1717), also known as Elizabeth Alden Pabodie or Elizabeth Peabody, was the first white child born in New England.

== Life ==
Elizabeth Pabodie was born Elizabeth Alden in 1623, the firstborn child of the Plymouth Colony settlers Priscilla Mullins and John Alden, who were both passengers on the Mayflower in 1620.

She married William Pabodie (Peabody), a leader of Duxbury, Massachusetts, on December 26, 1644. All 13 of their children were born in that settlement before Elisabeth eventually moved to Little Compton, Rhode Island, in the 1680s. She died on May 31, 1717, in Little Compton and was buried in the cemetery on Little Compton Common, officially called Old Commons Burial Ground. Her memorial is on Find A Grave as memorial #6868310.

== Descendants ==
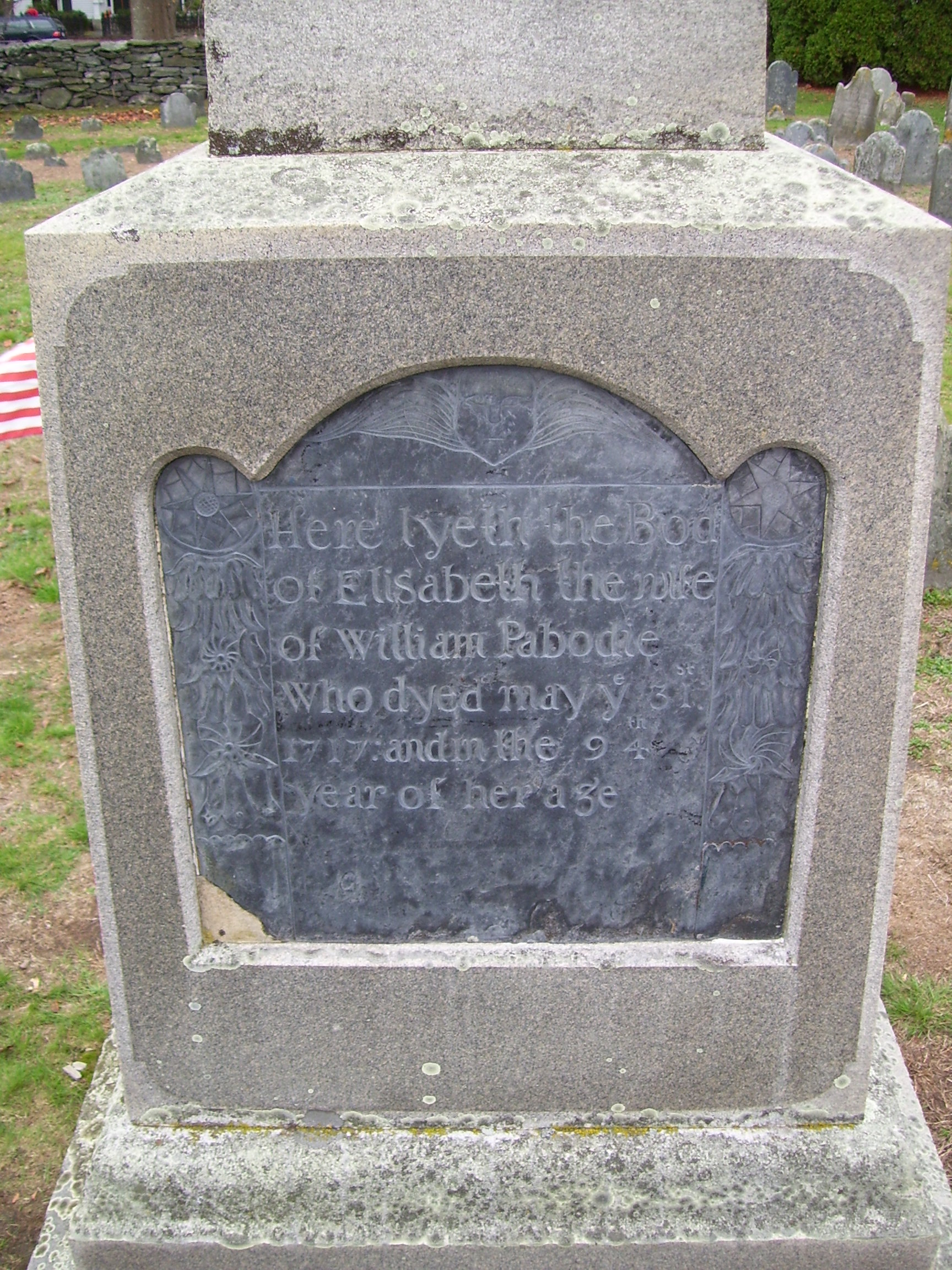

Elizabeth Pabodie's first child was a daughter, Lydia; next came a son named William after his father.

In 1683 Lydia married Daniel Grinnell Jr; they also had 13 children together.

William the younger and his wife Judith had a daughter Rebecca Peabody, who married the Reverend Joseph Fish. Their daughter Mary Fish married Gold Selleck Silliman (1732–1790), and they were the parents of Benjamin Silliman, the first person to distill petroleum, and grandparents of Benjamin Silliman, Jr. The Sillimans started the Chemistry Department at Yale, a forerunner of the Sheffield Scientific School. Benjamin Silliman, Jr. married Susan Huldah Forbes; their daughter Alice Trumbull Silliman married William Richardson Belknap (1849-1914). It is through this lineage that the Belknap and Humphrey families of Kentucky descended.

Other descendants of Elizabeth Alden Pabodie and William Pabodie include Priscilla Pabodie, Rebecca Pabodie, Eleanor Belknap Humphrey (1876-1964), William Burke Belknap the younger, Alice Belknap Hawkes, Dr. Edward Cornelius Humphrey, Rev. Robert P. Shuler, Alice Humphrey Morgan, economist Thomas MacGillivray Humphrey, Barbara Morgan Meade, co-founder of the Washington, D.C., bookstore, Politics and Prose, Charles Davis, Zechariah Vincent, and whistleblower Edward Snowden.

Henry Wadsworth Longfellow was also a descendant of Elizabeth Pabodie. He made her parents John Alden and Priscilla Mullins famous through his poem The Courtship of Miles Standish.
