= Thomas Wiswall =

- Born: Warrington, Lancashire, England
- Baptised: 30 September 1601
- Died: 6 December 1683; Cambridge Village, Massachusetts Bay Colony, British America
- Resting place: East Parish Burying Ground, Newton, Massachusetts
- Monuments: First Settlers Monument
- Citizenship: Kingdom of England
- Known for: early settler of Cambridge Village, Massachusetts, founder of Cambridge Village Church
- Children: 10, see text

Thomas Wiswall (1601–1683) was an early settler of English America, a prominent early citizen of the Massachusetts Bay Colony, and a key figure in the founding of Cambridge Village, now known as the city of Newton, Massachusetts.

== Early life ==
Wiswall was baptised in Warrington, Lancashire, England on 30 September 1601. He married Elizabeth Berbage in 1632, and had ten children:

- Enoch Wiswall (born 8 September 1633, England; died 28 November 1706)
- Esther Wiswall (born 1635, Dorchester, Suffolk County, Massachusetts), married William Johnson
- Ichabod Wiswall (born 3 June 1637, Dorchester, Suffolk, Massachusetts; died 23 July 1700)
- Noah Wiswall (born 30 December 1638, Dorchester, Suffolk, Massachusetts; died 6 July 1690)
- Mary Wiswall (born 1640, Dorchester, Suffolk, Massachusetts)
- Ebenezer Wiswall (born 8 December 1641, Dorchester, Suffolk, Massachusetts; died 1691)
- Thomas Wiswall (born 1642, Dorchester, Suffolk, Massachusetts)
- Sarah Wiswall (born 19 March 1643, Dorchester, Suffolk, Massachusetts)
- Elizabeth Wiswall (born 15 April 1649, Dorchester, Suffolk, Massachusetts)
- Benjamin Wiswall (born 15 April 1649, Dorchester, Suffolk, Massachusetts)

Wiswall arrived in New England on August 16, 1635 (leaving behind him brothers Adam, Abiel and Jonathan), and settled in Dorchester, Massachusetts with his twin brother John, who had arrived in 1633. He was a grantee of land in 1637, subscriber to the school fund in 1641, and served as a selectman in Dorchester from 1644–1652.

== Founding of Cambridge Village ==
Wiswall left Dorchester and resettled in Cambridge, Massachusetts, some time in 1654. In 1654, he sublet a 400-acre (1.6 km^{2}) tract of land there from Captain Thomas Prentice. This land had been the property of the recently deceased John Haynes, former Governor of the Massachusetts Bay Colony and later Governor of the Colony of Connecticut, and Prentice was the lessee and not the owner. Wiswall built a new homestead that year, beside the Dedham Trail (now Centre Street), on the south shore of a lake located on that tract of land. This was the first house to be built on the shore of what would be known—for 150 years—as Wiswall's Pond. The lake is now known as Crystal Lake, in Newton, Massachusetts.

John Jackson (the first settler in the area) donated an acre of land to be used as a burying place and for a meeting house. Wiswall built this meeting house, where today the East Parish Burying Ground (also known as the Centre Street Cemetery) and the First Settlers Monument are currently located.

In 1656, Wiswall and John Jackson signed a petition for release from supporting the church at Cambridge. This was the beginning of a movement for the area to become a separate and distinct entity from Cambridge. After a struggle that lasted for 32 years, these efforts were ultimately successful. In 1688, the area became formally known as Cambridge Village. Cambridge Village was renamed Newtown in 1691, and finally Newton in 1766.

Wiswall started the Cambridge Village Church, and was installed first ruling elder and assistant pastor on 20 July 1664. He also served as fence viewer and surveyor of roads for the area.

== Death and burial ==
Wiswall died in Cambridge Village on 6 December 1683. He is buried in the East Parish Burying Ground in Newton. His second wife, Isabella Farmer (a widow from Ansley, Warwickshire, England), survived him and died in Billerica, Massachusetts, in May 1686.

== Notable descendants ==
- Wiswall's son, Ichabod Wiswall (born 3 June 1637, Dorchester, Suffolk, Massachusetts; died 23 July 1700) was third pastor of the church in Duxbury, Plymouth Colony. Officiating at the burial of Captain Jonathan Alden, he gave the first known funeral sermon in British America.
- Wiswall's son, Captain Noah Wiswall (1638–1690), was killed in battle at Wheelwright Pond at Lee, New Hampshire, during events leading up to the Battle of Quebec during King William's War on July 6, 1690.
- Noah Wiswall (1699–1786), grandson of Noah Wiswall (1638–1690). In 1776, at 76 years of age, he marched 28 miles (45 km) from Newton to Lexington, where he was wounded at the Battle of Lexington.
- Jeremiah Wiswall (1725–1809), Captain, East Newton Company of Minutemen, Concord and Dorchester, American Revolutionary War. He was the son of Noah (1699–1786), and was his commander on the battlefield.
- Alexander Eugene Wiswall
- Lauren Marie Wiswall
- Jonathan Trumbull
- Benjamin Silliman, Jr.

== See also ==
- Oak Hill Park
