= The Courtship of Miles Standish =

1858 poem written by Henry Wadsworth Longfellow

A scene from The Courtship of Miles Standish, showing Standish looking upon Alden and Mullins during the bridal procession

The Courtship of Miles Standish is an 1858 narrative poem by American poet Henry Wadsworth Longfellow about the early days of Plymouth Colony, the colonial settlement established in America by the Mayflower Pilgrims.

== Overview ==
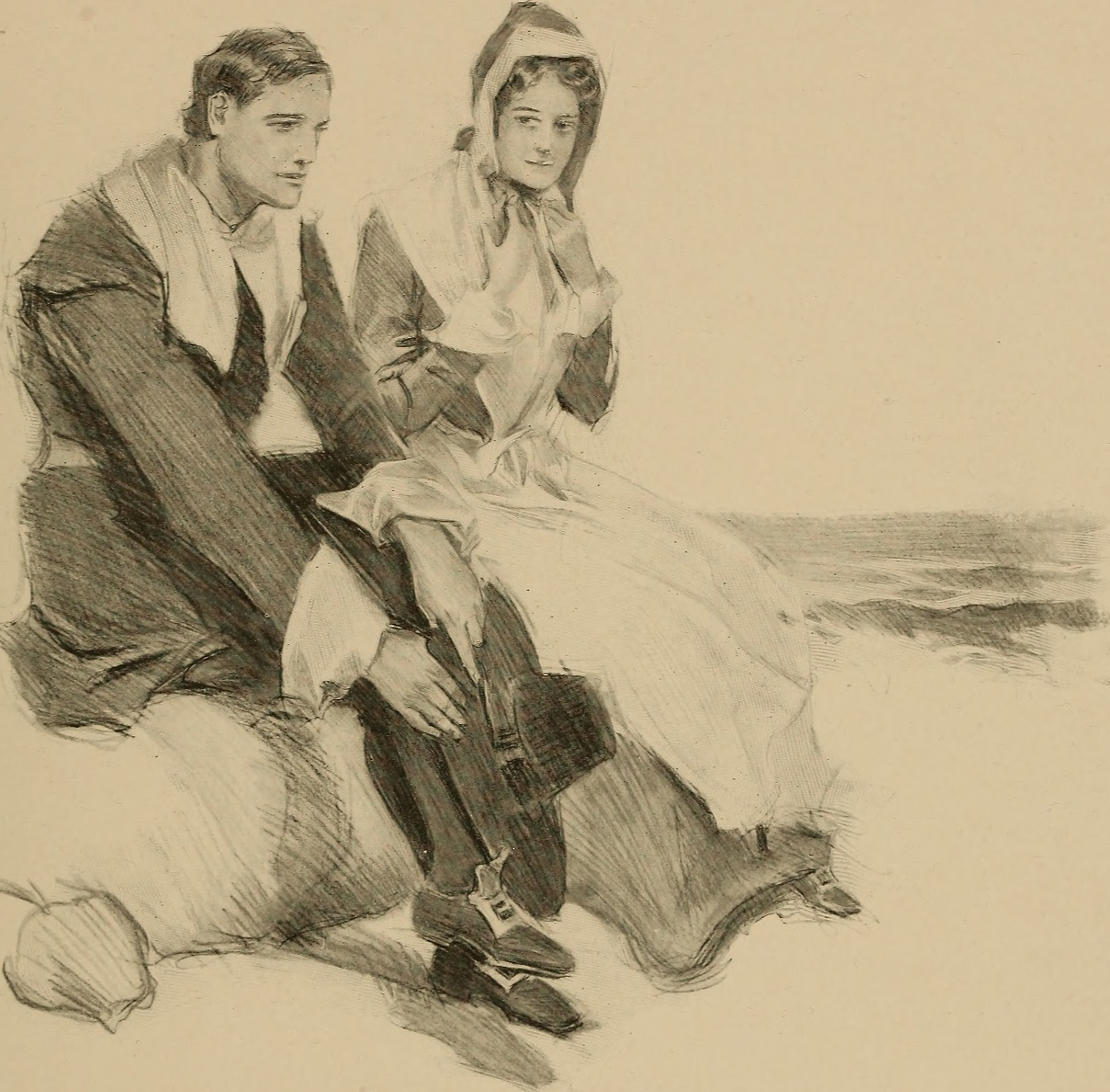
Priscilla Mullins, illustration from a 1903 printing

The Courtship of Miles Standish is set in the year 1621 against the backdrop of a fierce Indian war and focuses on a love triangle among three Mayflower passengers: Miles Standish, Priscilla Mullins, and John Alden. Longfellow claimed the story was rooted in family tradition, yet there is a complete absence of historical evidence to support its major elements.

== Fictionalized history ==
A debate persists as to whether the tale is fact or fiction. Main characters Miles Standish, John Alden, and Priscilla Mullins are based upon real Mayflower passengers. Longfellow was a descendant of John Alden and Priscilla Mullins through his mother Zilpah Wadsworth. Skeptics dismiss his narrative as a folktale. At minimum, Longfellow used poetic license, condensing several years of events. Scholars have confirmed the cherished place of romantic love in Pilgrim culture, and have documented the Indian war described by Longfellow. Miles Standish and John Alden were likely roommates in Plymouth; Priscilla Mullins was the only single woman of marriageable age in the young colony at that time and did in fact marry Alden. Standish's first wife, Rose Handley, died aboard the Mayflower in January 1621. Two years later, Standish married a woman named Barbara in Plymouth in 1623. The Standish and Alden families both moved from Plymouth to adjacent Duxbury, Massachusetts in the late 1620s, where they lived in close proximity, intermarried, and remained close for several generations. Upon his death in 1656, Standish's widow, Barbara, appointed John Alden to take inventory of Standish's estate.

== Composition and publication history ==
The first reference to the poem recorded in Longfellow's journal is dated December 29, 1857, where the project is referred to as "Priscilla". By March 1 the next year, it was renamed The Courtship of Miles Standish.

The ballad was very popular in nineteenth-century America. It was published in book form on October 16, 1858, and it sold 25,000 copies after two months. Reportedly, 10,000 copies were sold in London in a single day.

Standish is memorialized in a low relief sculpture of six characters from Longfellow's epic poems executed by Daniel Chester French and installed at Longfellow Park, in Cambridge, Massachusetts, located in front of Longfellow's former home, now a U.S. National Historic Site maintained by the National Park Service.

== Poetic meter ==
Courtship of Miles Standish is written in dactylic hexameter, the same meter used in classical epic poetry such as Homer's Iliad and Odyssey and Vergil's Aeneid. Longfellow used the same meter in his poem Evangeline.

== Cultural references ==
The story of Standish, Alden, and Mullins is referenced in A Charlie Brown Thanksgiving. After Patricia "Peppermint Patty" Reichardt insults Charlie Brown's Thanksgiving dinner, an embarrassed Brown leaves the table to be alone. Marcie points out Patty's overreach, and is asked by Patty to apologize on her behalf. Marcie suggests Patty should make the apology in person, but is convinced by Patty to do it. Linus then suggests the situation is similar to "the story of John Alden, and Priscilla Mullins, and Captain Miles Standish?" Patty then replies, "This isn't like that one at all." After the apology is made and accepted, Patty enters Charlie's home, and Marcie states, "He's all yours, Priscilla."

Elements of the story were written into the plot of the Rankin/Bass special The Mouse on the Mayflower.

Subject of a radio play called 'The Courtship of Miles Standish.' It was broadcast on November 23, 1949 on Family Theater on the Mutual Broadcasting System, episode 145.

A 1940 Merrie Melodies cartoon depicts their own version of the story in The Hardship of Miles Standish. The Krazy Kat episode "The Pilgrim's Regress" depicts a comedic version of the story.

"A Bone of Contention" (aired in 1997), an episode of Wishbone, featuring the plot and characters of Longfellow's The Courtship of Miles Standish. It stars Kevin Page as Miles Standish, Amy Acker as Priscilla and Soccer the Dog (voiced by Larry Brantley) as John Alden.

== See also ==
- The Courtship of Miles Standish (1923 film)
