= John Alden =

Crew member on the Mayflower

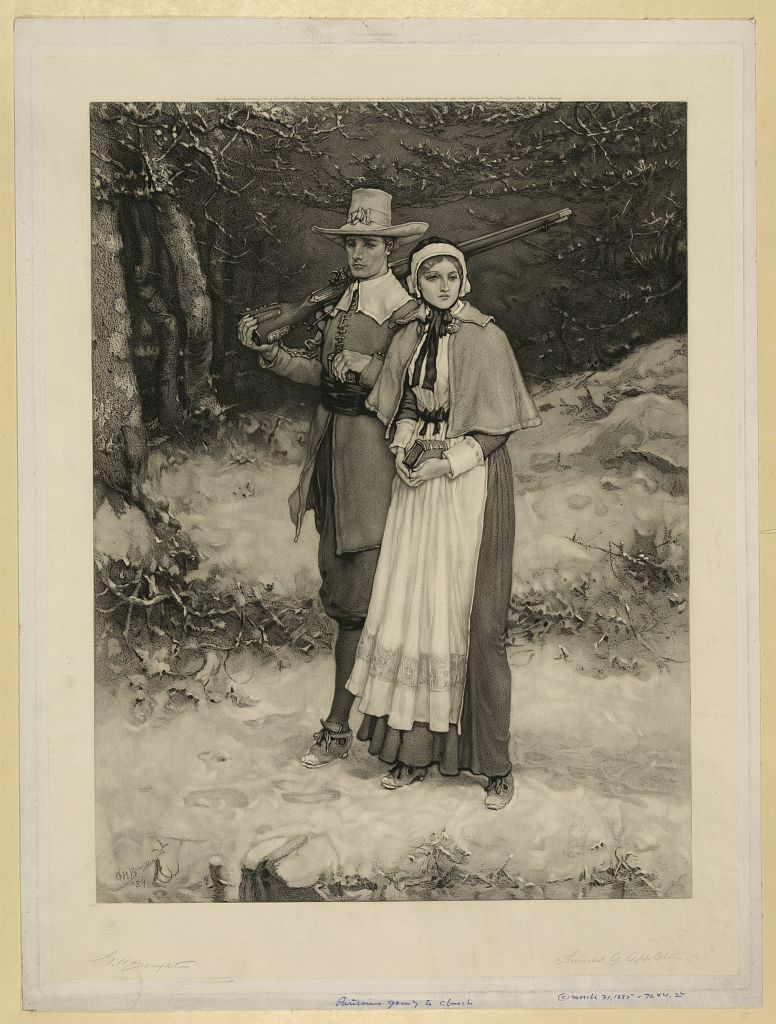
- A conjectural image of John and Priscilla Alden by George Henry Boughton, 1884

Governor pro tempore of Plymouth Colony
- In office October 30, 1677
- Appointed by: Josiah Winslow
- Monarch: Charles II
- In office March 7, 1665
- Appointed by: Thomas Prence
- Monarch: Charles II

Member of the Governor's Council of Assistants of Plymouth Colony
- In office June 4, 1650 – September 12, 1687
- In office February 6, 1632 – June 2, 1640

Personal details
- Born: c. 1598 England
- Died: September 12, 1687 (aged 89) Plymouth, Dominion of New England
- Spouse: Priscilla Mullins (m. 1621; died 1685)
- Children: 10, including Elizabeth, John Jr., and Jonathan
- Occupation: Magistrate, fur trader, cooper

John Alden (c. 1598 – September 12, 1687) was an English cooper and magistrate active in Massachusetts Bay Colony, best known as one of the passengers on the 1620 voyage of the Mayflower which brought the English settlers, commonly known as Pilgrims, to Plymouth Colony in Massachusetts. He was hired in Southampton, England, as the settlers' cooper, responsible for making and maintaining the barrels that the colony would need. He was on Governor Bradford's list of settlers and was one of the original signers of the Mayflower Compact. He had the choice to return to England but decided to remain in Plymouth Colony and married there.

He married fellow Mayflower passenger Priscilla Mullins, whose entire family perished in the first winter in Plymouth Colony. The marriage of the young couple became prominent in Victorian popular culture after the 1858 publication of Henry Wadsworth Longfellow's fictitious narrative poem The Courtship of Miles Standish. The book inspired widespread depictions of John and Priscilla Alden in art and literature during the 19th and 20th centuries.

Alden was one of Plymouth Colony's most active public servants and played a prominent role in colonial affairs. He was annually elected to the Governor's Council nearly every year from 1640 to 1686. He served as Treasurer of Plymouth Colony, Deputy to the General Court of Plymouth, a member of the colony's Council of War, and a member of the colony's Committee on Kennebec Trade, among other posts.

He was the seventh and last surviving signatory to the Mayflower Compact upon his death in 1687. The approximate location of his grave in the Myles Standish Burial Ground was marked with a memorial stone in 1930. The site of his first house in Duxbury, Massachusetts, is preserved and marked with interpretative signs. The Alden Kindred of America began as a society of John and Priscilla's descendants, and it maintains the Alden House Historic Site in Duxbury, Massachusetts—likely built by Alden's son, Capt. Jonathan Alden.

== English origins ==
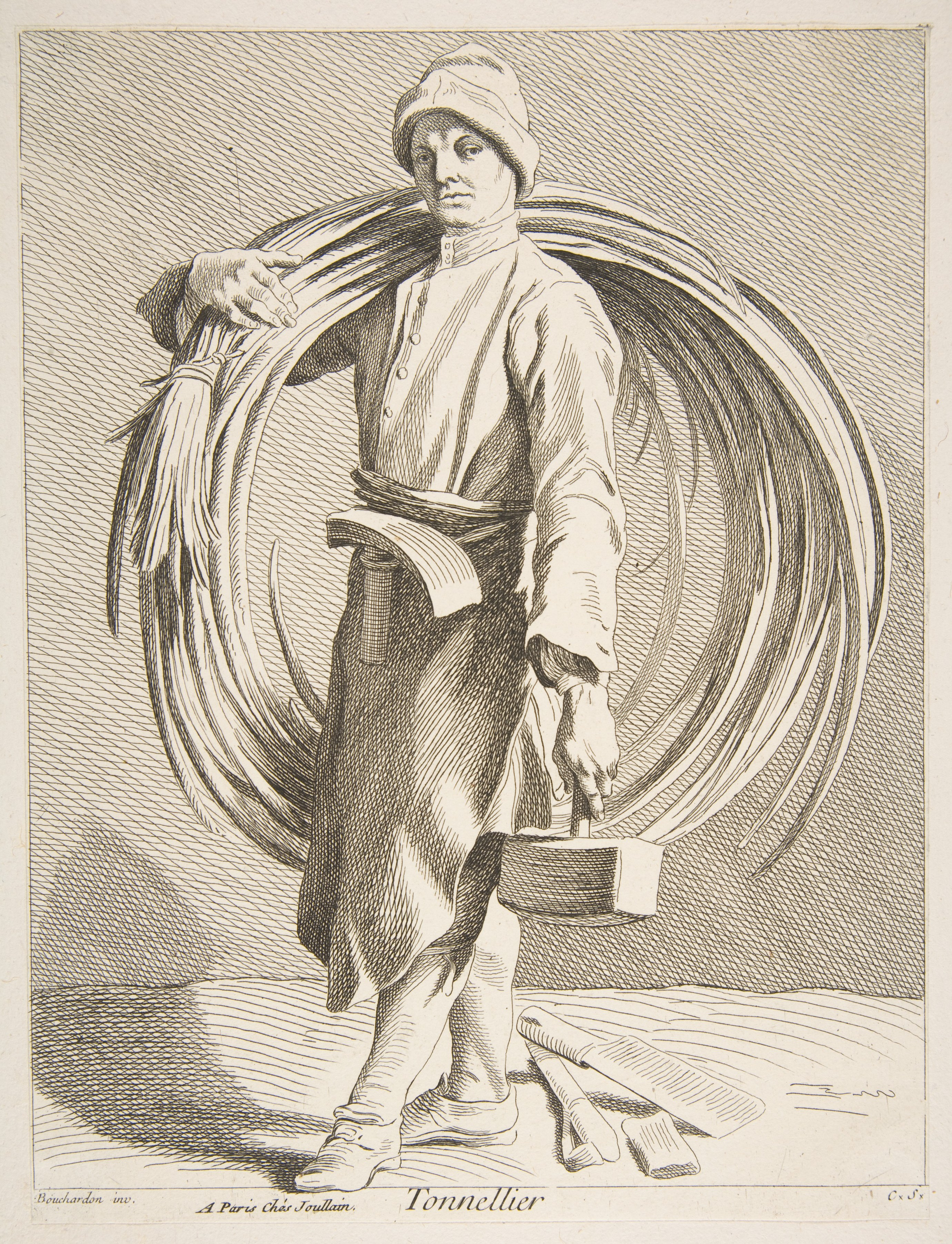
Cooper by Anne Claude Philippe de Tubières, an 18th-century etching of a cooper holding barrel hoops

Historians and genealogists have advanced many theories to the English origin of John Alden. According to the "American Ancestors" project of the New England Historic Genealogical Society, Alden genealogical expert Alicia Crane Williams has called two of the hypothesized origins "tempting"; however, she asserts that none are definitively proven.

The only definite primary source evidence regarding Alden's background comes from Plymouth Colony Governor William Bradford's history Of Plymouth Plantation. Bradford wrote that Alden "was hired for a cooper, at South-Hampton, wher the ship victuled; and being a hopefull yong man, was much desired, but left to his owne liking to go or stay when he came here; but he stayed, and maryed here". Charles Edward Banks states that the employment of Alden "at Southampton" does not necessarily mean that he was a resident of the seaport and may have been there to work only temporarily when the Mayflower arrived.

Banks cited research by certain historians and genealogists who offered theories as to Alden's origin based on inconclusive but possibly relevant evidence. One such theory was proposed by historian and genealogist B. Carlyon-Hughes who found evidence of an Alden family living in Harwich in Essex, England during the 17th century. Harwich is an ancient North Sea port, northeast of London, which was the home port of the ship Mayflower and home of its captain Christopher Jones. Carlyon-Hughes asserted that the Aldens of Harwich were related to Jones and also that a young John Alden of the Harwich Aldens was about the same age as the Mayflower passenger. A prior association with the captain of the Mayflower (although not definitively proven) could account, according to Banks, for Alden joining the crew. Historian George F. Willison subscribed to the Harwich origin theory and wrote that Alden's children "remembered him as tall, blond, and very powerful in physique". Willison, however, offers no specific source material for this description.

Another theory cited by Banks, which he called "a fair presumption", involves a John Alden of Southampton who "may have been the son of George Alden the fletcher, who disappeared—probably dying in that year—leaving John, an orphan, free to take employment overseas. Jane, the widow, may have been his mother and Richard and Avys his grandparents". The tax list of Holyrood Ward, Southampton in 1602 lists the names of George Alden and John's future father-in-law William Mullins. Banks even went so far as to postulate that, if the Alden and Mullins families both originated from Southampton, then perhaps their courtship began in Southampton.

Alicia Crane Williams analyzed these and several other theories in The Mayflower Descendant, a scholarly journal of Pilgrim history and genealogy. She pointed out that some genealogists have connected John Alden of the Mayflower with John Alden, "son and heir of John Alden of Swanscomb, Kent" who obtained a Patent of Arms in 1607. There is no evidence that John Alden of the Mayflower was connected to this family or inherited this coat of arms. Williams states, "This Alden coat of arms was published in the Encyclopædia Britannica and has led many unsuspecting [genealogists] astray."

== Voyage of the Mayflower ==
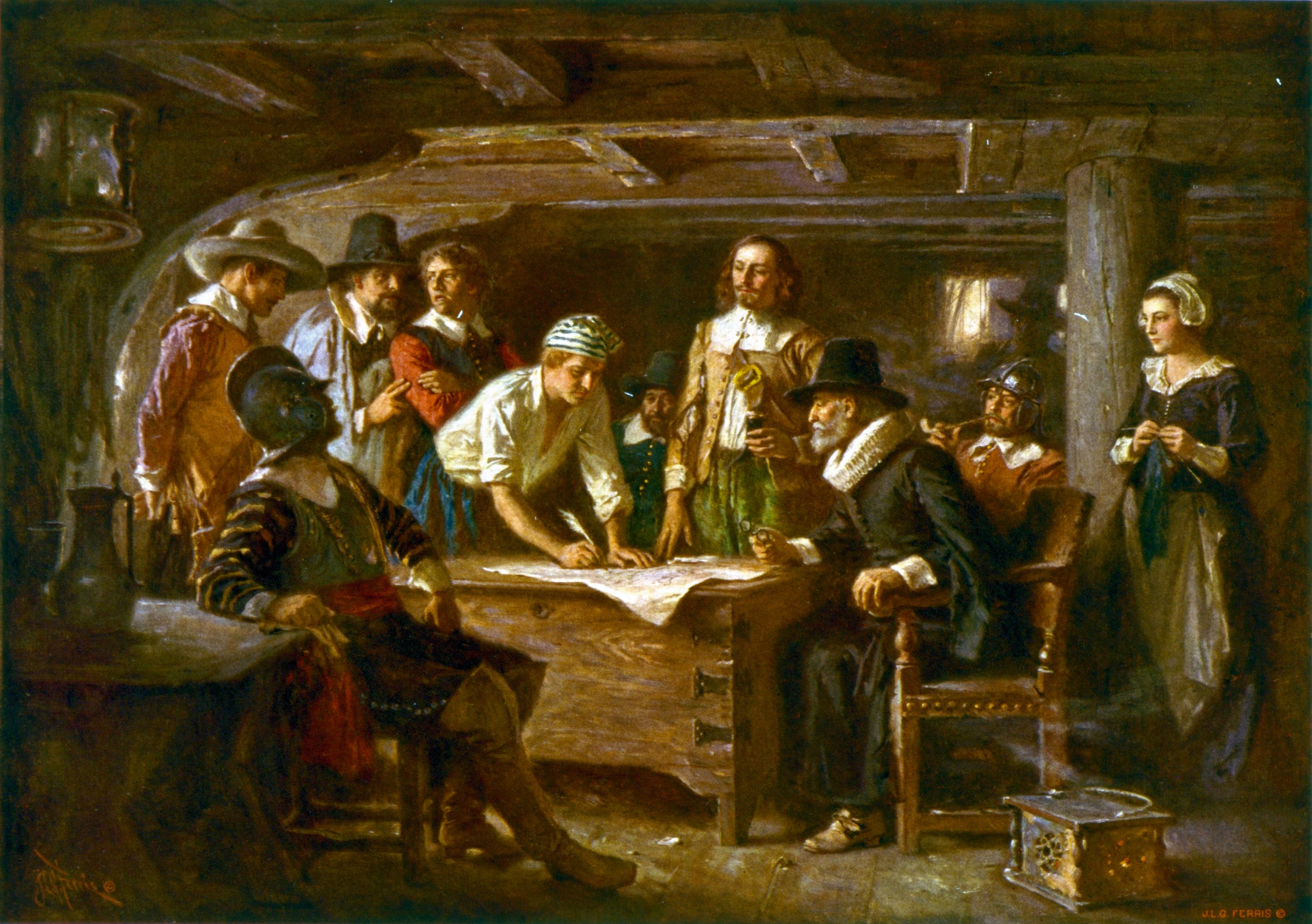
The Mayflower Compact 1620: an 1899 painting by Jean Leon Gerome Ferris depicts John Alden signing the document.

Alden was hired by Capt. Christopher Jones in Southampton when he was about 21 years old to work as the ship's cooper during the Mayflower's voyage to America. According to historian Nathaniel Philbrick, the colonists encouraged him during the voyage to remain with them in America due to his useful skills as a barrel-maker and carpenter.

The Mayflower departed Plymouth, England, on September 6, 1620. The 100-foot ship had aboard 102 passengers and a crew of about 20 to 30 in extremely cramped conditions. A lack of proper rations and unsanitary conditions for months caused illnesses that eventually proved fatal for many, particularly to women and children. There were two deaths during the ocean crossing, a crew member and a passenger.

The ship spotted Cape Cod on November 9, 1620, after about two months at sea. Their original destination had been the mouth of the Hudson River, which was then part of the Colony of Virginia. Capt. Jones made an attempt to round the southern end of Cape Cod, but he lacked an adequate chart of the area known as Pollock's Rip, and the strong currents and dangerous shoals there forced him to turn back. Jones determined that the colonists would have to disembark and settle in New England rather than the Hudson River due to widespread illness aboard ship and dwindling supplies. The Mayflower eventually came to anchor on November 11 in Provincetown Harbor at the northern tip of Cape Cod.

The decision to settle outside of Virginia Colony raised some problems. The group carried a patent which granted authority to their elected leaders and entitled them to establish their own plantation within the bounds of Virginia Colony. They were settling in New England, however, so the patent became irrelevant and some members began to question the authority of their leaders. To settle these questions, the colony's leadership drew up the Mayflower Compact, an agreement that they would work together, acting as "a civil body politic" in obedience to such laws as the colony might enact. The Mayflower Compact was signed by all free male settlers on November 11, the same day that they set anchor at Provincetown. John Alden signed the document, which is an indication that he had already made the decision to remain with the settlers. He was the youngest of the signers and the last survivor.

== Establishing Plymouth Colony ==
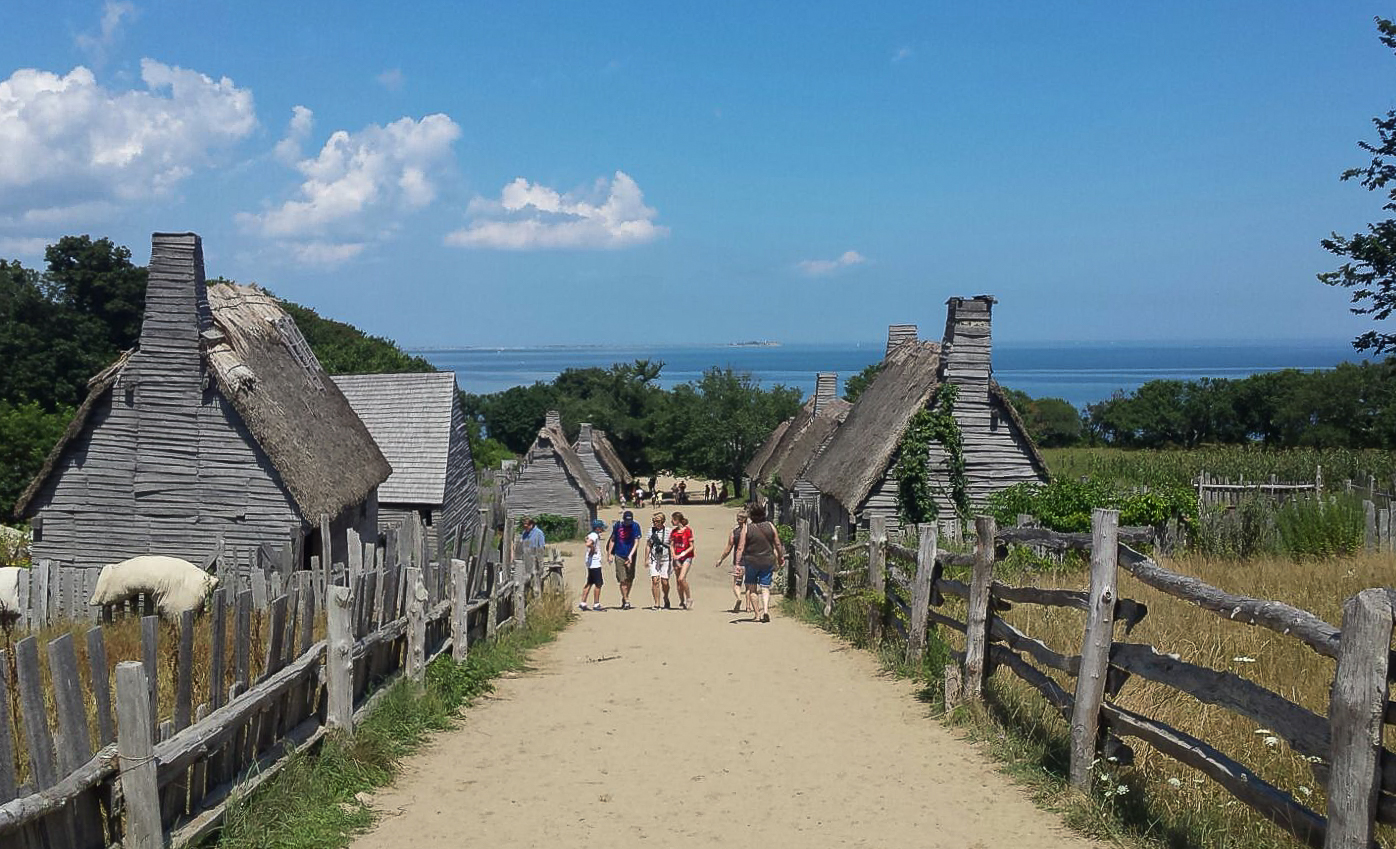
A view of the recreated Plimoth Patuxet, which includes a replica of John Alden's house seen second from the left

After exploring the inner shoreline of Cape Cod, the colonists chose to settle in Plymouth. The site offered a good harbor, several fresh water springs, and a large hill overlooking the harbor (which they would later name Burial Hill) suitable for a fort. A tribe known as the Patuxet (part of the Wampanoag peoples) had settled the site and cleared a large area of land for planting corn. By the time the Mayflower arrived, the Patuxet tribe had been wiped out by plagues, likely as a result of contact with English fishermen.

During their first winter in Plymouth, most of the settlers fell ill and half died of disease. Priscilla Mullins (John Alden's future wife) lost her entire family—her father William, her mother Alice, and her brother Joseph. The fifty colonists who survived began building a fort atop Burial Hill and small wooden houses on either side of a "street" now known as Leyden Street, named in 1823 after the town in Holland where the Pilgrims lived for several years. A small plot of land at the foot of Burial Hill near the top of the street was designated for John Alden. He built a primitive house in this location and lived there for about seven years with his wife Priscilla and his growing family. The site of Alden's first house in Plymouth was marked in 1930 with a boulder and bronze plaque placed by the Alden Kindred of America. A recreation of this house stands today at Plimoth Patuxet, a living history museum which replicates the original Pilgrim settlement.

== Marriage to Priscilla Mullins ==
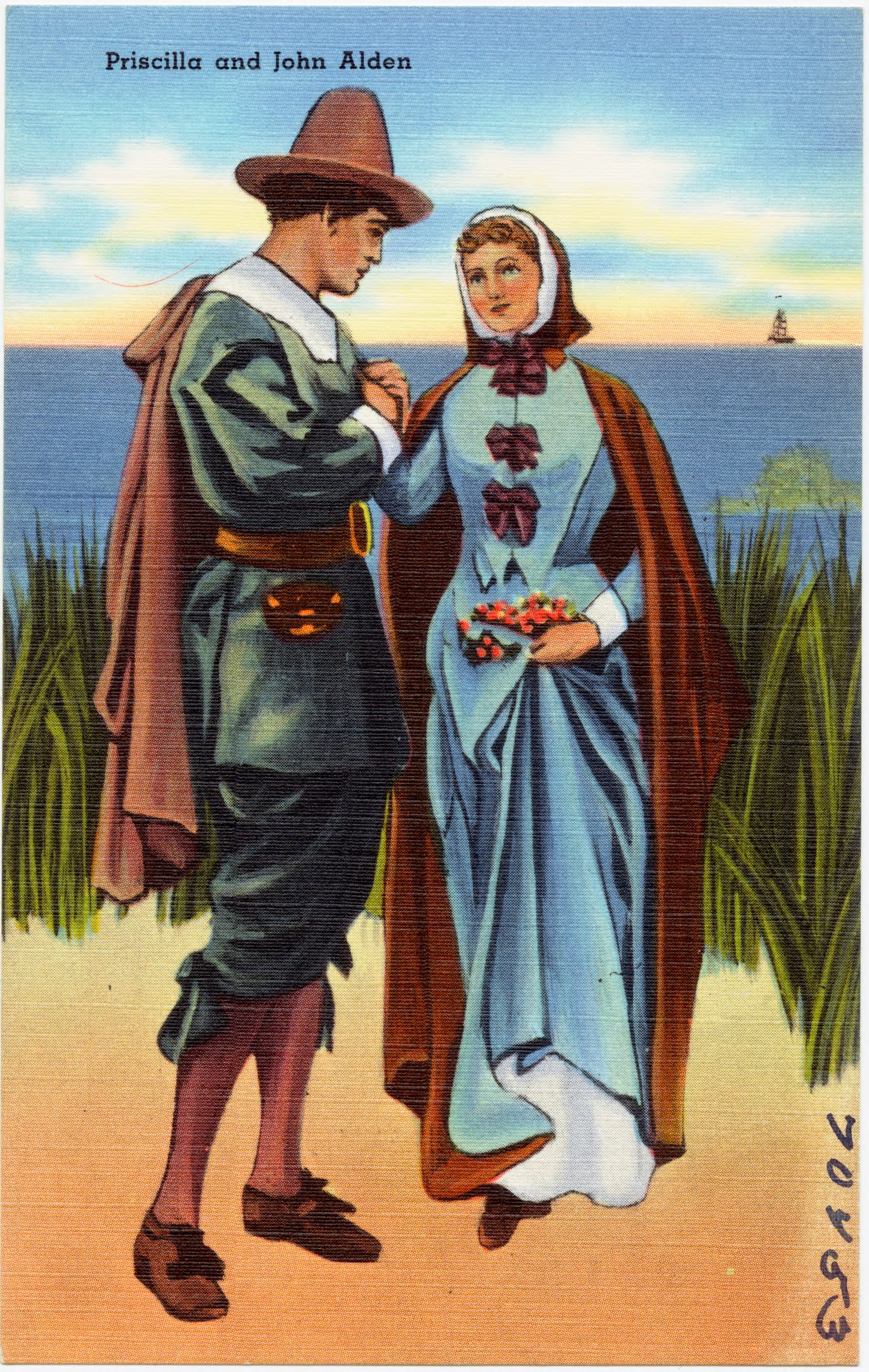
A romanticized, early-20th-century depiction of John and Priscilla Alden's courtship

The exact date of John Alden's marriage to Priscilla Mullins was not noted in colonial records. According to the Pilgrim Society, it was likely in 1622 as Priscilla Mullins is not listed separately in the 1623 Division of Land. It was either the second or third marriage to take place in the colony.

The marriage of the two young colonists has been widely depicted in art and literature primarily due to the extraordinary popularity of Henry Wadsworth Longfellow's narrative poem The Courtship of Miles Standish, published in 1858. The fictionalized story tells of a love triangle involving John Alden, Priscilla Mullins, and Myles Standish (the captain of the colony's militia). In the story, Standish is too timid to express his feelings to Priscilla Mullins and therefore asks Alden to speak for him. Alden's words of courtship on Standish's behalf prompt Mullins to offer an often-quoted quip, "Why don't you speak for yourself, John?" The book sold 10,000 copies in London in a single day. In the United States, the story brought the Pilgrims to the forefront of American culture, contributing to the establishment of a national Thanksgiving holiday in 1863. The book made John and Priscilla Alden celebrated figures in American popular culture.

While some historians state that the courtship story is "loosely based" on Alden family oral history, others dismiss it as complete fiction. A brief account of a rivalry between John Alden and Myles Standish for Priscilla's hand was first published in A Collection of American Epitaphs and Inscriptions by Timothy Alden in 1814. Longfellow, therefore, was not the originator of the story but he greatly embellished it. No part of the tale is supported by 17th-century documentation. Historian John Goodwin pointed out several anachronisms and inconsistencies, asserting, there was no "reason for believing any part of it."

== Service to Plymouth Colony ==
In 1626, the colony's financial backers in London, known as the Merchant Adventurers, disbanded. This left the colonists with no means of settling their significant debts to those who had funded the effort. Eight of the Plymouth colonists, including John Alden, agreed to collectively assume, or undertake, the debt in exchange for a monopoly on the fur trade from the colony. These men who averted financial ruin for the colony became known as the "Undertakers". This agreement to grant the Undertakers a monopoly was signed by the 37 freemen of Plymouth Colony. The fact that Alden was among the Undertakers is indicative of his growing stature in the colony.

Alden was elected Governor's Assistant (one of a small council of advisors to the Governor) in 1632 and was regularly reelected to that office until 1640 and then again from 1650 to 1686, because he was deputy from Duxbury from 1641 to 1642, and from 1645 to 1649, and a member of Captain Miles Standish's militia company from 1643. He also served as Deputy Governor on two occasions in the absence of the Governor in 1665 and 1677. The colonists elected him Treasurer annually from 1656 to 1658. Alden served on the colony's Council of War, an important committee to decide on matters pertaining to the defense of the colony, in 1642, 1643, 1646, 1653, 1658 and 1667. The Plymouth General Court appointed Alden to a number of important committees including the Committee to Revise Laws, the Committee on the Kennebec Trade, and a number of additional minor posts. He then served for several years as magistrate.

Plymouth Colony held a patent entitling them to a monopoly on the fur trade at the Kennebec River in what would later become Maine. In 1634, a man named John Hocking from Piscataqua Plantation in New Hampshire interloped in the trade provoking a confrontation between him and traders from Plymouth Colony at Kennebec. Hocking shot a Plymouth colonist named Moses Talbot and, in turn, a Plymouth man shot Hocking. When the Plymouth traders arrived by boat at Boston, authorities there decided to imprison John Alden who was aboard the Plymouth vessel, even though he had not been present during the violence. It was only through the intervention of William Bradford that Alden was eventually released.

== Settlement of Duxbury ==
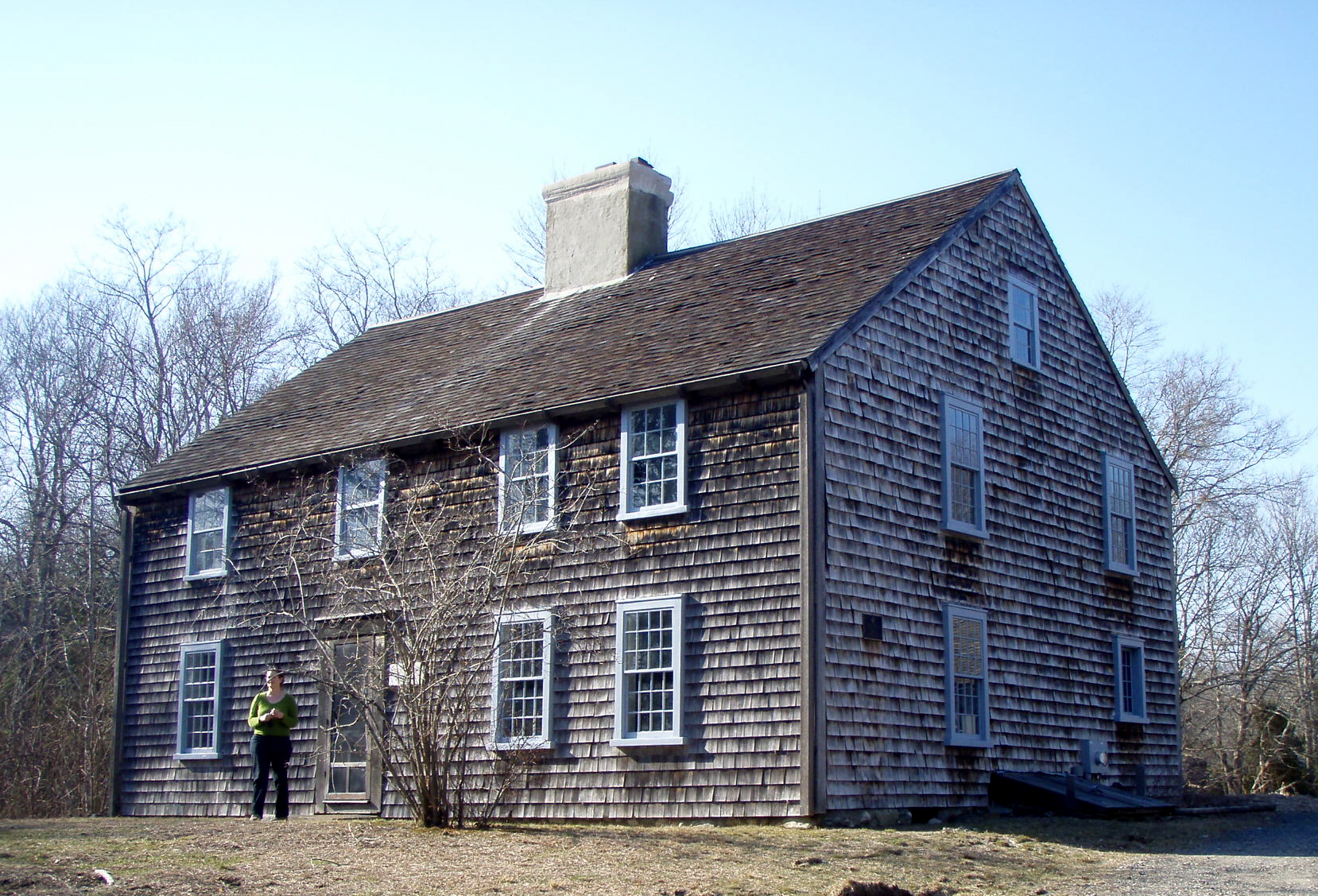
Alden House Historic Site, likely built by John and Priscilla's son Jonathan Alden, c. 1700

In January 1628, the land along Plymouth Bay was divided up into farm lots with each individual receiving 20 acres plus an additional 20 acres for each family member. John and Priscilla Alden, who had three children at that time, received 100 acres along the Bluefish River in the area known as Duxbury (sometimes spelled Duxburough or Duxborrow at that time). Grants were drawn by lot, so the location of Alden's farm was not his selection. By chance, as historian Dorothy Wentworth observed, the location was ideal as it included upland that had been partially cleared by Native Americans, woodland, and salt marshes (a good source of hay). Alden built their first small house in 1628. As they were required to travel to Plymouth every Sunday for Sabbath services (10 miles away), they lived seasonally on their Duxbury farm for the first few years, staying in Plymouth during the winter to avoid long travels in harsh weather. The site was professionally excavated by Roland Wells Robbins in 1960, unearthing many artifacts including a halberd blade which is now exhibited at Pilgrim Hall Museum in Plymouth. The site is now part of the Duxbury school campus and is located next to a playing field. The footprint of the house is evident as a depression in the ground and is marked by a boulder, plaque, and other interpretive signage.

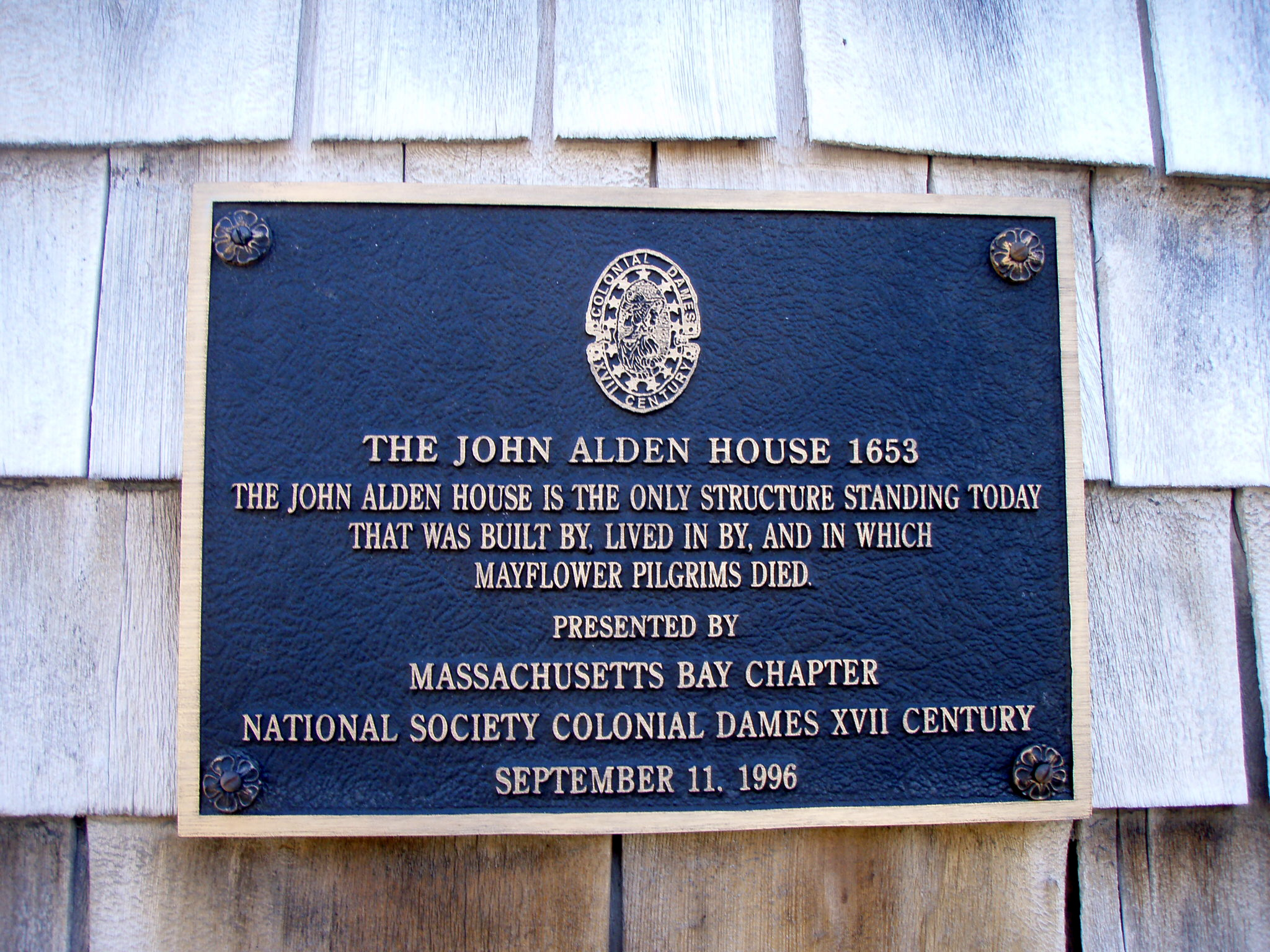
The historic marker at John Alden House

In 1632, Alden was one of several men who petitioned the colony to have Duxbury set off as a separate church congregation with their own minister. This would allow those with Duxbury grants to reside on their farms year-round. William Bradford and other colonial officials were reluctant to break apart the "mother" church congregation in Plymouth but nonetheless gave permission. Duxbury was incorporated as a separate town in 1637. John Alden became one of the leading men of the new town of Duxbury and a key figure in the colony. He served as Deputy from Duxbury to the General Court for most of the 1640s.

Local historians of the 19th and 20th centuries asserted that a later Alden house in Duxbury was the second home of John and Priscilla Alden and was constructed in 1653. As local historian Dorothy Wentworth wrote, the tradition "has been accepted for so long that there seems no point in doubting it." This house is now owned by the Alden Kindred of America and maintained as a museum known as the Alden House Historic Site. Long-standing assumptions about the house turned out to be incorrect as Dendrochronological and architectural analysis conducted in 2003 suggest that the house was likely built about 1700 and therefore was not the home of John and Priscilla Alden. It was likely built by one of their children (possibly Jonathan Alden) or grandchildren.

The Alden's first Duxbury home site and the Alden House Historic Site were together granted National Historic Landmark status in 2008.

== Family ==
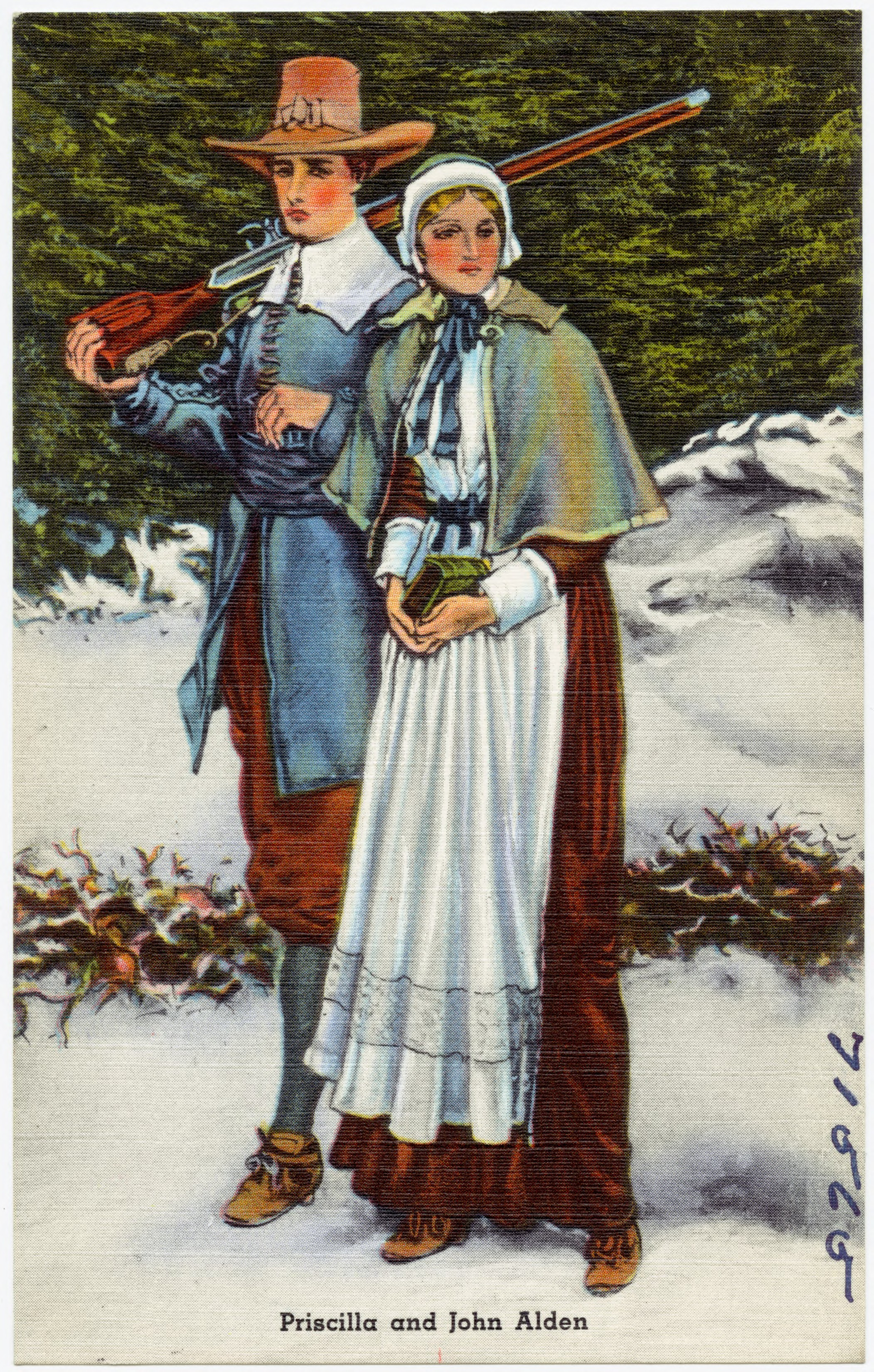
Early-20th-century depiction of Priscilla and John Alden

John and Priscilla Alden had ten children:

1. Elizabeth was born in 1623 in Plymouth and died in Little Compton, Rhode Island, on May 31, 1717. She married William Pabodie on December 26, 1644 in Duxbury and had thirteen children. Her grave and that of her husband are in the Old Commons Cemetery in Little Compton.
2. John Jr. was born about 1626 in Plymouth and died in Boston on March 14, 1701/2. He married Elizabeth (Phillips) Everill on April 1, 1660, and had fourteen children. He became a prosperous maritime merchant. He also played a controversial role in dealings with Native Americans in New Brunswick and Nova Scotia during King William's War. In 1692, he was accused of being a witch during the Salem witch trials and jailed, though he later escaped and fled to Duxbury.
3. Joseph was born about 1628 and died in Bridgewater, Massachusetts on February 8, 1696/7. He married Mary Simmons about 1660 and had seven children.
4. Priscilla was born about 1630. Little is known about her life except for a record which indicates she was alive and unmarried in 1688.
5. Jonathan was born about 1632 and died in Duxbury on February 14, 1697. He married Abigail Hallett on December 10, 1672, and had six children. Jonathan was buried in the Old Burying Ground in Duxbury. He was captain of the Plymouth Colony militia and documentation indicates that at his burial, the militia company attended in formation. During his burial, Rev. Ichabod Wiswall of Duxbury delivered a sermon. It is the first known instance of a sermon being delivered at a Plymouth Colony burial indicated changing religious customs. Prior to this, burials were simple affairs without religious ritual.
6. Sarah was born about 1634 and died before the settlement of her father's estate in 1688. She married Alexander Standish, son of Myles Standish, about 1660 and had eight children.
7. Ruth was born about 1636 and died in Braintree, Massachusetts on October 12, 1674. She married John Bass in Braintree on February 3, 1658, and had seven children. Among her children was Hannah Bass, paternal grandmother of future United States President John Adams.
8. Mary was born about 1638. She was alive and unmarried in 1688.
9. Rebecca was born about 1640. She married Thomas Delano in 1677 and had nine children. She died between June 12, 1696 and October 5, 1722. She is buried in Old Burying Ground in Duxbury.
10. David was born about 1642 and died in Duxbury between July 2, 1718, and April 1, 1719. He married Mary Southworth by 1674 and had six children.

== Final days and legacy ==
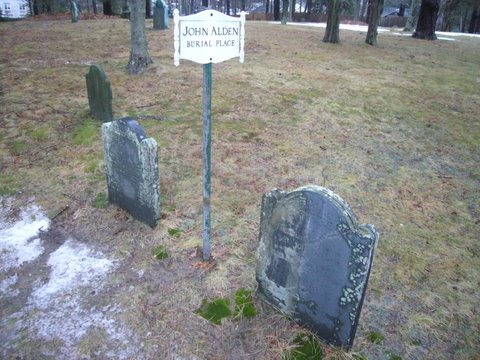
Commemorative headstones placed in 1930 to honor John and Priscilla Alden

John Alden was the last survivor of the signers of the Mayflower Compact. He died in Duxbury on September 12, 1687. Both he and his wife Priscilla were buried in the Old Burying Ground in South Duxbury. The precise location of their graves is not known as markers either were not placed or have crumbled away. In 1930, the Alden Kindred of America placed commemorative slate stones at the estimated location of their graves near the headstone of their son, Capt. Jonathan Alden.

Several artifacts attributed to John Alden are exhibited at major museums. These include the halberd blade discovered in the 1960 archaeological dig at the Alden first house site in Duxbury, the Alden family bible, and a mortar and pestle attributed to John and Priscilla Alden, all of which are displayed at Pilgrim Hall Museum. A wheel-lock carbine attributed to John Alden is housed at the National Firearms Museum. Of early-17th-century Italian make, the carbine was found in the Alden House during a 1924 restoration.

The Alden Kindred of America, initially a society composed strictly of Alden descendants, was established in 1906. It is now an incorporated non-profit organization welcoming both Alden descendants and non-descendants to its membership. The organization manages the Alden House Historic Site in Duxbury, Massachusetts.

According to the Alden Kindred of America, John Alden had more than one million living descendants as of 2008.

== Notable descendants ==
Notable descendants include:

- John Adams, 2nd President of the United States
- John Quincy Adams, 6th President of the United States and son of John Adams, the 2nd President of the United States
- Benedict Cumberbatch, British actor
- Jodie Foster, American actress and filmmaker
- Henry Wadsworth Longfellow, writer
- Edward Snowden, North American whistleblower and privacy spokesperson
- Dick Van Dyke, American entertainer.
