= Priscilla Alden =

Member of Massachusetts's Plymouth Colony of Pilgrims

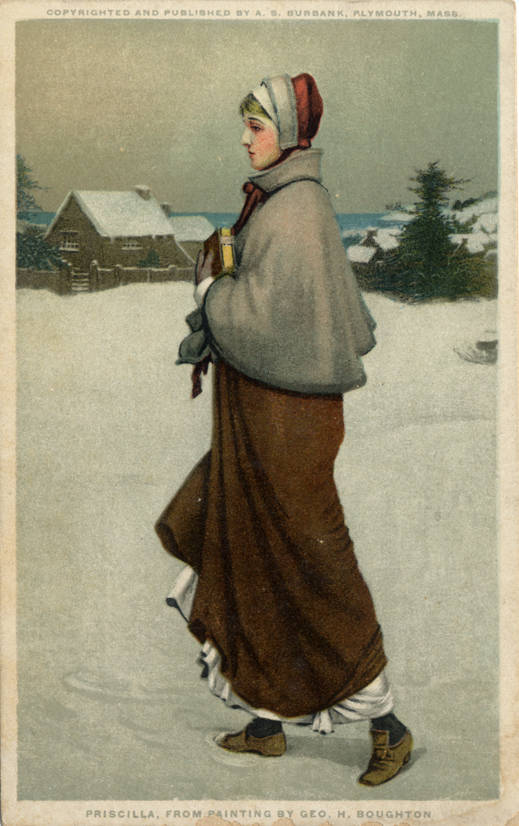
- Born: Priscilla Mullins c. 1602; Surrey, England
- Died: c. 1685
- Burial place: Myles Standish Burial Ground
- Spouse: John Alden (m. 1621)
- Relatives: William Mullins (father)

Priscilla Alden (née Mullins, c. 1602 – c. 1685) was a noted member of Massachusetts's Plymouth Colony of Pilgrims and the wife of fellow colonist John Alden (c. 1599 – 1687). They married in 1621 in Plymouth.

== Biography ==
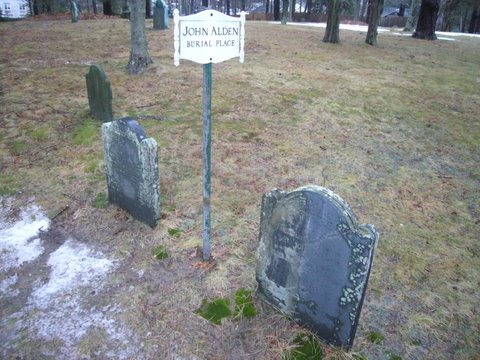
Myles Standish Burial Ground, the final resting place of John and Priscilla Alden

Priscilla was most likely born in Dorking in Surrey, the daughter of William and step-daughter of Alice Mullins. She was only seventeen when she boarded the Mayflower. She lost her father, step-mother and her brother Joseph during the first winter in Plymouth. She was then the only one of her family in the New World, although she had another brother and a sister who remained in England.

John Alden and Priscilla Mullins were probably the third couple to be married in Plymouth Colony. William Bradford's marriage to Alice Carpenter on August 14, 1623, is known to be the fourth. The first was that of Edward Winslow and Susannah White in 1621. Francis Eaton's marriage to his second wife Dorothy, maidservant to the Carvers, was possibly the second.

Priscilla is last found in the records in 1650, but oral tradition states that she died only a few years before her husband (which would be about 1680). She lies buried at the Miles Standish Burial Ground in Duxbury, Massachusetts. The exact location of her grave is unknown, but there is a marker honoring her.

== Longfellow's poem ==
A scene from Longfellow's The Courtship of Miles Standish, showing Standish looking upon Alden and Mullins during the bridal procession

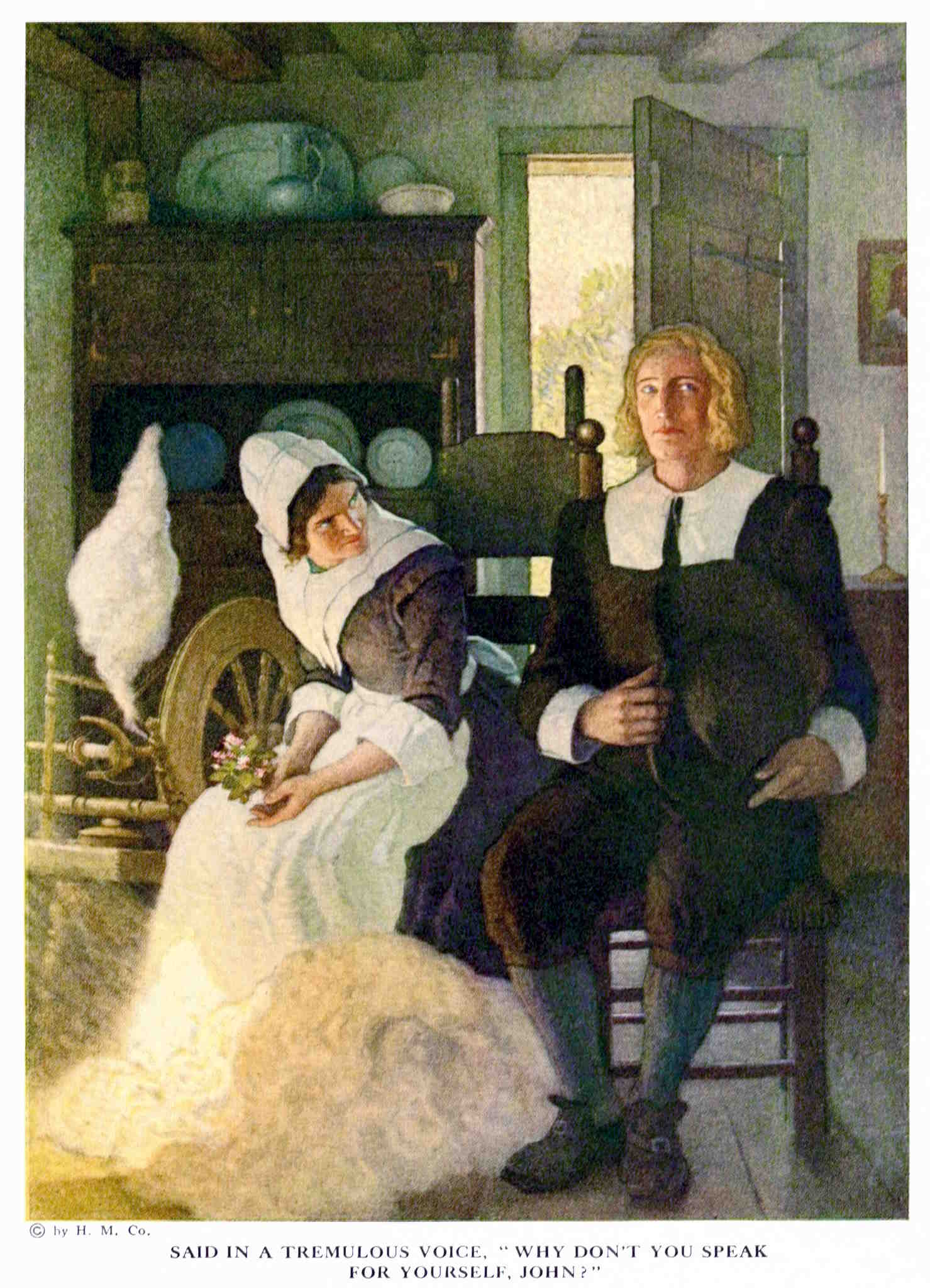
Illustration for the Longfellow poem ("Why don't you speak for yourself, John") by N.C. Wyeth, 1920.

She is known to literary history as the unrequited love of newly widowed Captain Miles Standish, the colony's military advisor, in Henry Wadsworth Longfellow's 1858 poem The Courtship of Miles Standish. According to the poem, Standish asked his good friend John Alden to propose to Priscilla on his behalf, only to have Priscilla ask, "Why don't you speak for yourself, John?"

Longfellow was a direct descendant of John and Priscilla, and based his poem on a romanticized version of a family tradition although, until recently, there was little independent historical evidence for the account. The basic story was apparently handed down in the Alden family and published by John and Priscilla's great-great-grandson Rev. Timothy Alden in 1814.

Scholars have recently confirmed the cherished place of romantic love in Pilgrim culture, and have documented the Indian war described by Longfellow. Circumstantial evidence of the love triangle also exists. Miles Standish and John Alden were likely roommates; Priscilla Mullins was the only single woman of marriageable age. The families of the alleged lovers remained close for several generations, moving together to Duxbury, Massachusetts, in the late 1620s.

== The Alden children ==
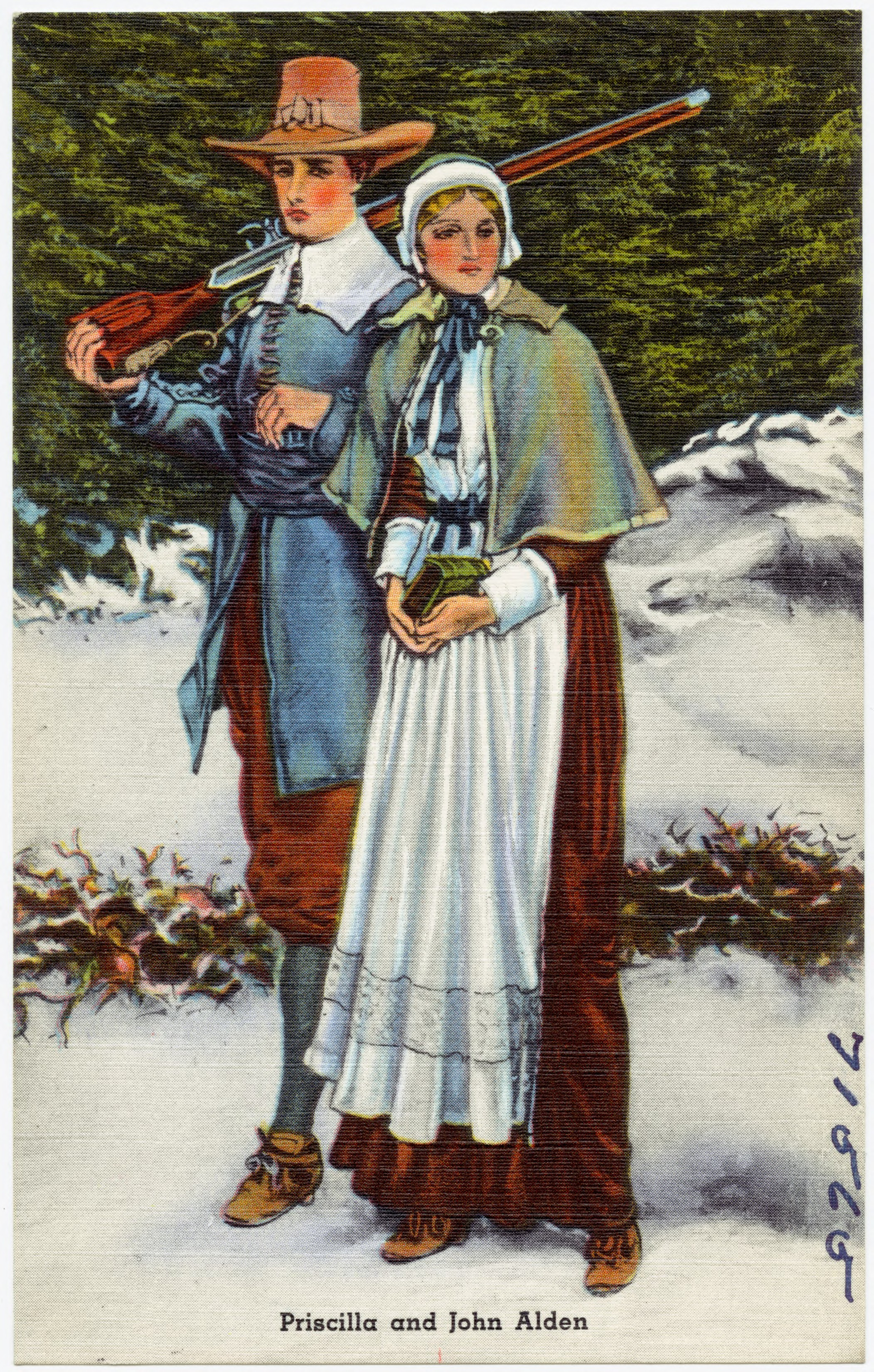
Priscilla and John Alden depicted on a postcard

Priscilla and John Alden had ten children, with a possible eleventh dying in infancy. It is presumed, although not documented, that the first three children were born in Plymouth, the remainder in Duxbury. The children were:

1. Elizabeth. (1624/25–1717). Married William Pabodie (Peabody), a civic and military leader of Duxbury, where all thirteen of their children were born. They moved to Little Compton, Rhode Island, where Elizabeth died in 1717 at the age of about ninety-four. Their descendants were prominent in settling areas of Rhode Island and Connecticut. From Elizabeth's line comes the individual most credited with spreading the fame of John and Priscilla far and wide, Henry Wadsworth Longfellow in his Courtship of Miles Standish.
2. John (1626–1701). Moved to Boston and married there Elizabeth (Phillips) Everill, widow of Abiel Everill. They had thirteen children. He was a mariner and became a naval commander of the Massachusetts Bay Colony. He was a member of the Old South Church of Boston and his ancient slate headstone is embedded in the wall there. Perhaps the best known event of his life was when he was accused of witchcraft on a trip to Salem, spending fifteen weeks in a Boston jail. He escaped shortly before nine of the other victims were executed during the Salem witch trials. Alden was later exonerated.
3. Joseph. (1627–1697) Moved to Bridgewater where he was a farmer on land purchased earlier from the Indians by his father and Myles Standish. He married Mary Simmons. They had a total of seven children. Joseph died sometime after.
4. Sarah. Her marriage to Myles Standish's son Alexander undercuts any idea of a long-standing feud between the Aldens and the Standish clan. In fact, there is much evidence to suggest that John and Myles remained lifelong friends or, at the minimum, associates. Sarah and Alexander lived in Duxbury until Sarah's death sometime before June 1688. (Alexander subsequently married Desire Doty, a twice-widowed daughter of Pilgrim Edward Doty.) They had seven or possibly eight children. Their home Alexander Standish House in Duxbury still stands.
5. Jonathan. Married Abigail Hallett, December 10, 1672. Lived in Duxbury until his death February 14, 1697. He was the second owner of the Alden House which he received from his father. The house then passed to his own son John, one of his six children. At his funeral oration, Jonathan was described as "a sincere Christian, one whose heart was in the house of God even when his body was barred hence by restraints of many difficulties which confined him at home."
6. Ruth. Married John Bass of Braintree, Massachusetts, where they lived and had seven children. Of the more illustrious descendants of this union came Presidents John Adams and John Quincy Adams. Ruth died on October 12, 1674.
7. Rebecca. Married Thomas Delano of Duxbury by 1667, a son of Philip Delanoye, one of the original settlers of Duxbury. They had nine children. Died in Duxbury sometime after June 13, 1688.
8. Mary. Married Deacon Samuel Allen, a union that produced at least one son, Joseph. Mary died in 1688. Joseph would go on to have several children of his own.
9. Priscilla, born 1628. Married Captain John Thurber in 1645. They had 8 children. She died in 1692.
10. David. Married Mary Southworth, daughter of Constant Southworth of Plymouth Colony. Died sometime during 1719. Six children. A man described as "a prominent member of the church, a man of great respectability and much employed in public business."

== Legacy ==
Prescott W. Baston's Sebastian Miniatures produced pewter figurines of the Aldens.
