= Folk art of the United States =

Folk art in the United States refers to the many regional types of tangible folk art created by people in the United States of America. Generally developing in the late 18th and early 19th centuries, when settlers revived artistic traditions from their home countries in a uniquely American way, folk art includes artworks created by and for a large majority of people. It is defined by artistic expressions in a practical medium that has a specific purpose or continues a certain tradition important to a community of people. It includes hand crafted items such as tools, furniture and carvings, and traditional mediums such as oil paintings and tapestries which often served dual purposes, such as for the protection of a surface.

== Development and history ==
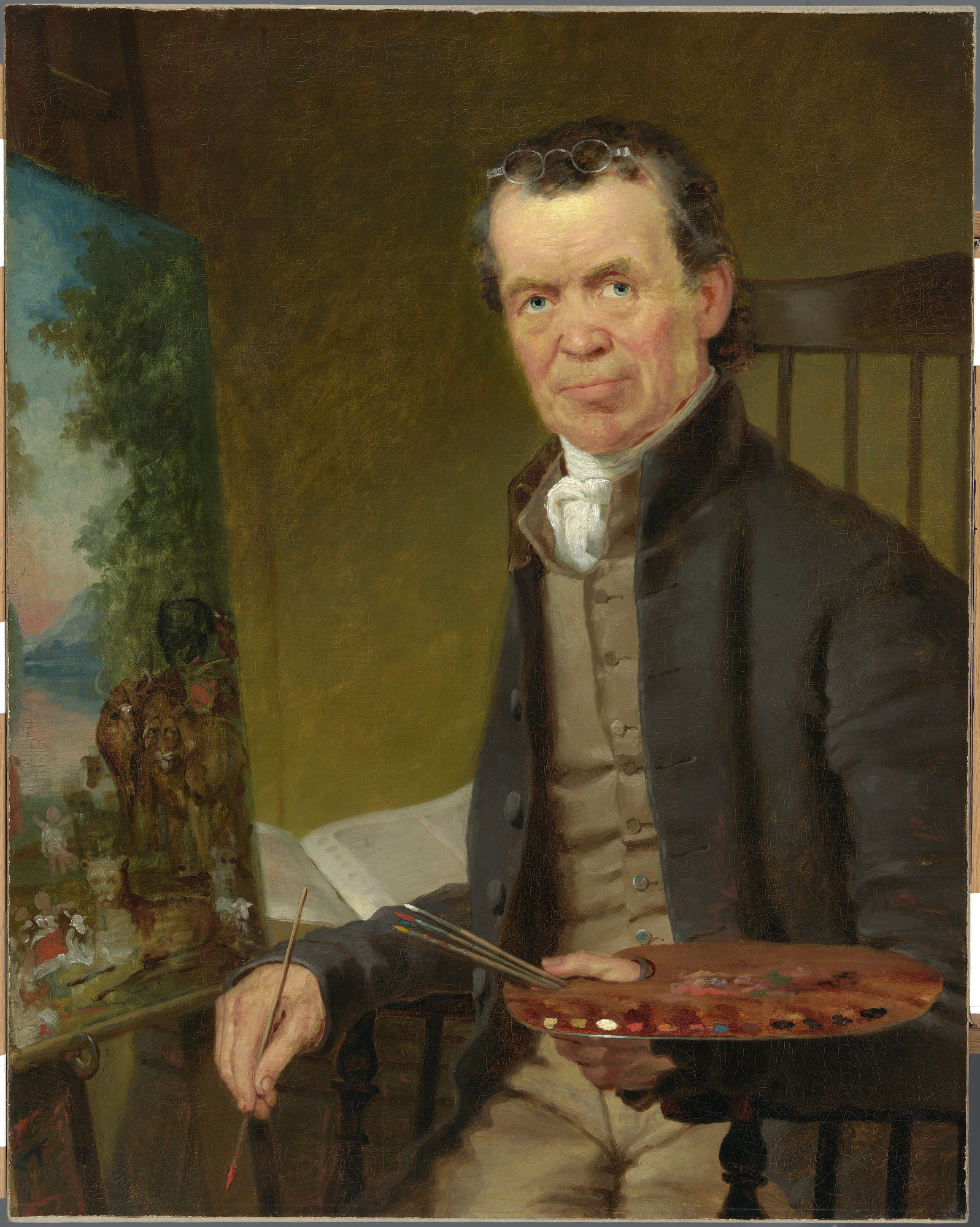
Edward Hicks Painting the Peaceable Kingdom by Thomas Hicks, depicting Edward Hicks painting one of his most noted artworks.

In colonial America, folk art grew out of artisanal craftsmanship in communities that allowed commonly trained people to individually express themselves, distinct from the high art tradition that dominated Europe, which was less accessible and generally less relevant to American settlers. The movements in art and craftsmanship in colonial America generally lagged behind that of Western Europe, with the prevailing medieval style of woodwork and primitive sculpture becoming integral to early American folk art, despite the emergence of renaissance styles in the late 16th and early 17th centuries in England. This would have been early enough to have a considerable impact on American folk art styles if it were not for the already adopted forms. As styles slowly changed, there was a tendency for rural artisans to continue the preexisting style longer than their urban counterparts, and far longer than those from Western Europe.

Surviving examples from as early as the beginning of the 17th century showcase a mixture of mediums and art styles, with portraits being painted in the New England area as early as the 1640’s. The prevalence and variety of folk art mediums and styles is due, in part, to social values in early colonial America that viewed the colonies as somehow inferior to the ruling European nations. Much of the fine art from the period focused on European scenes and values, leaving the expression of life in the colonies to folk art.

Communities with strong religious practices such as the Puritans and Quakers at times rejected the practice of art as being worldly and indulgent, leading to less ornate artworks, and fewer with any kind of prioritized purpose of personal expression. Despite this, many members of these communities still engaged in artistic expression often for religious reasons, or dealing with religious subject matter. A prominent example of such an individual was the painter Edward Hicks, a Quaker from the New England area who lived from 1780 to 1849.

== Challenges ==
Due to the often multiple practical uses of folk art artifacts from the United States, many pieces of art go anonymous and unconnected to any specific artists. Although there are many prominent and well known American folk artists, there are many more who are lacking in biographical details or cannot have anonymous creations attributed to them, posing a challenge to the study of folk art.

== Types ==
=== Painting ===
==== Portraiture ====
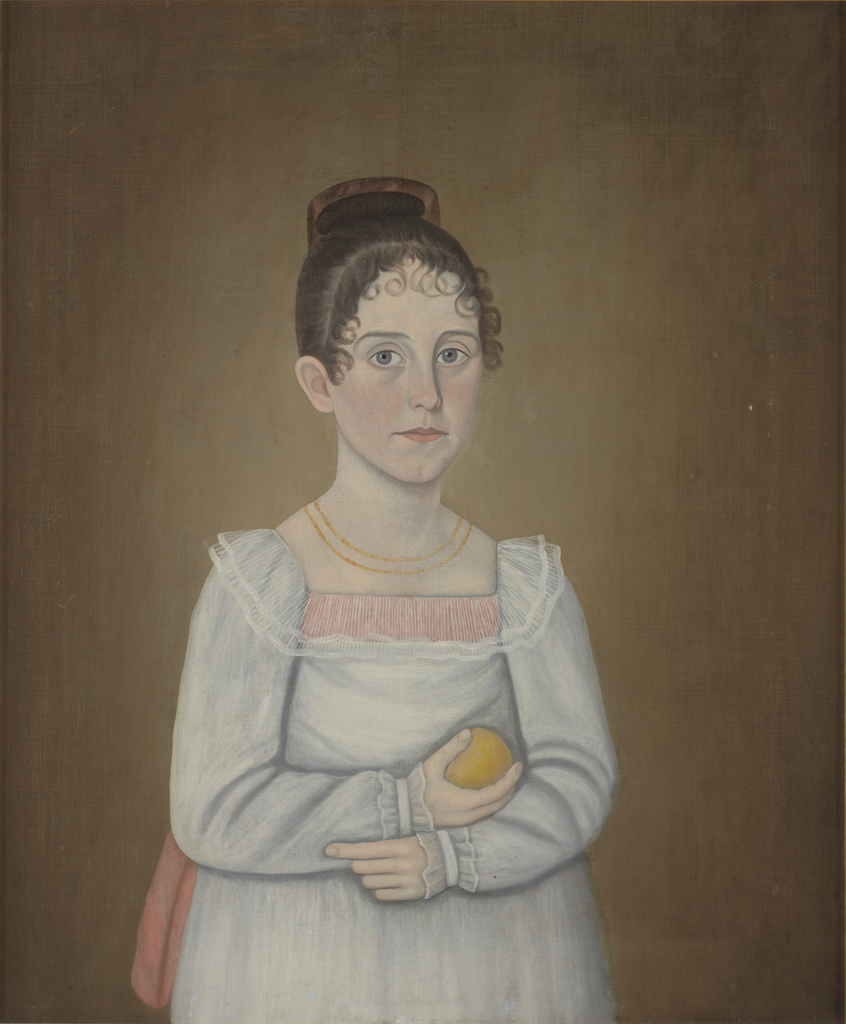
John Brewster Jr, Portrait of a Young Girl

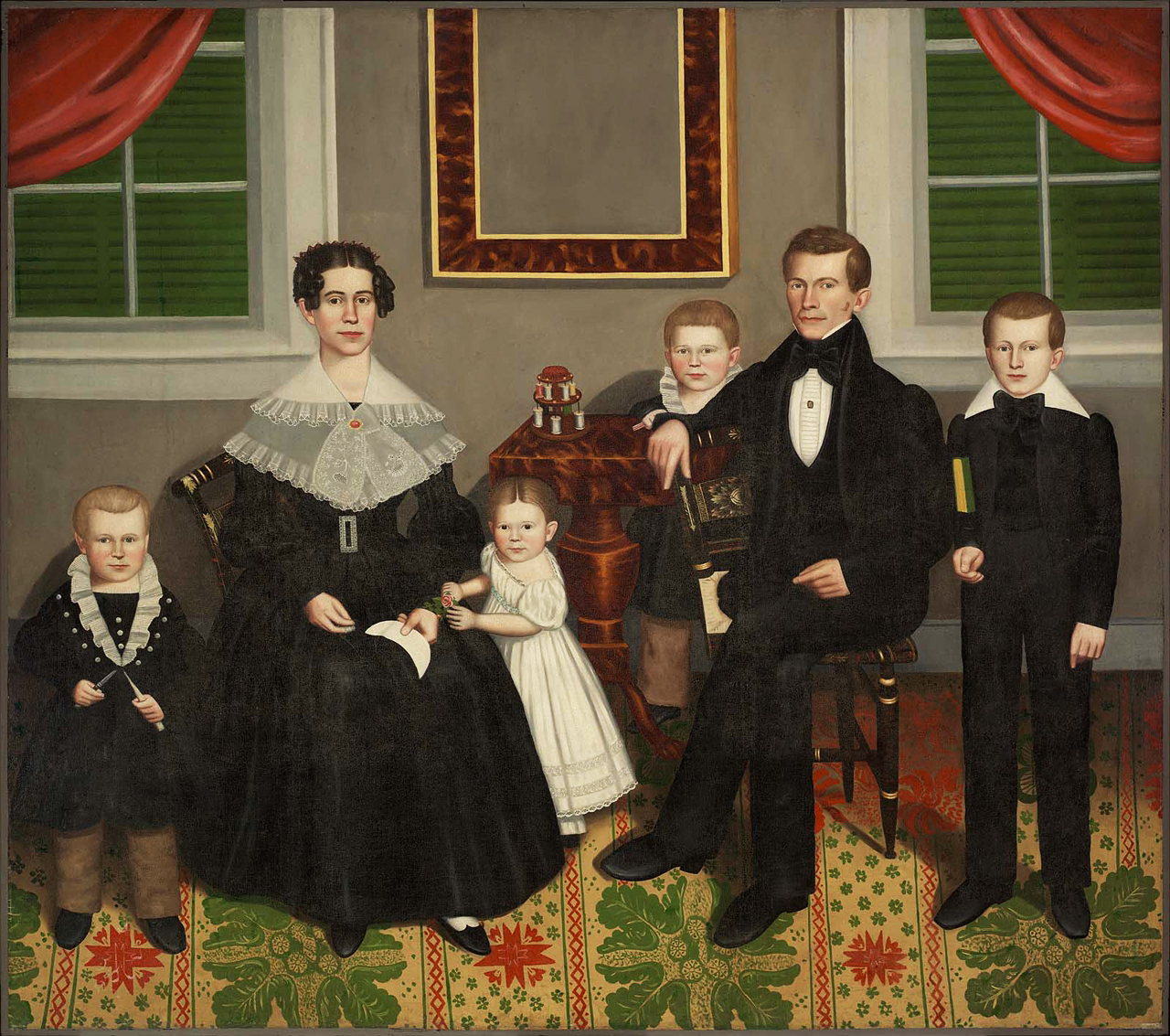
Erastus Salisbury, Joseph Moore and His Family

The style of American folk portraiture varied across different regions due to the diversity of immigrants. However, there is some influence of academic conventions in the composition, setting and poses of the portraits. There were two types of settings for portraits: a solid, monotone backdrop or the homes of the sitters often surrounded by objects that conveyed their personality, status or gender. The portraits are restrained in all aspects as they are characterized by a flattened perspective with generalized lighting which created little to none tonal shading. As artists distorted scale and depth, they confined their sitters to a narrow dimension of space between the picture plane and the background behind them to allow for a shorter depth of field. There is an overall flatness and linearity to the paintings due to the flat, delicate application of paint across the entire artwork. The artworks are carefully composed with clear spatial arrangements for each figure within the work as the sitters are either posted in full profile, looking straight at the viewer or slightly turned to one side. Folk art portraits were either bust portraits from the chest upwards or full body portraits with static poses as artists often relied on compositional formulas for the face and hands which provided a resemblance to all the sitters which allowed artists to work quickly with limited materials and time. This resulted in the lack of emotion depicted through the stern expressions, direct gazes and tight pursed lips. Motifs and objects were used instead as an identifying mark for the patrons with books and eventually newspapers were a common traditional motif in male portraits, while female portraits contained symbols of femininity and domesticity such as fruits, flowers, animals or handheld fans. The texture and patterns of the sitters' clothes, furniture or carpets allowed artists to enliven the already sombre portraits and evoke the personality of the sitters.

==== Fraktur art ====
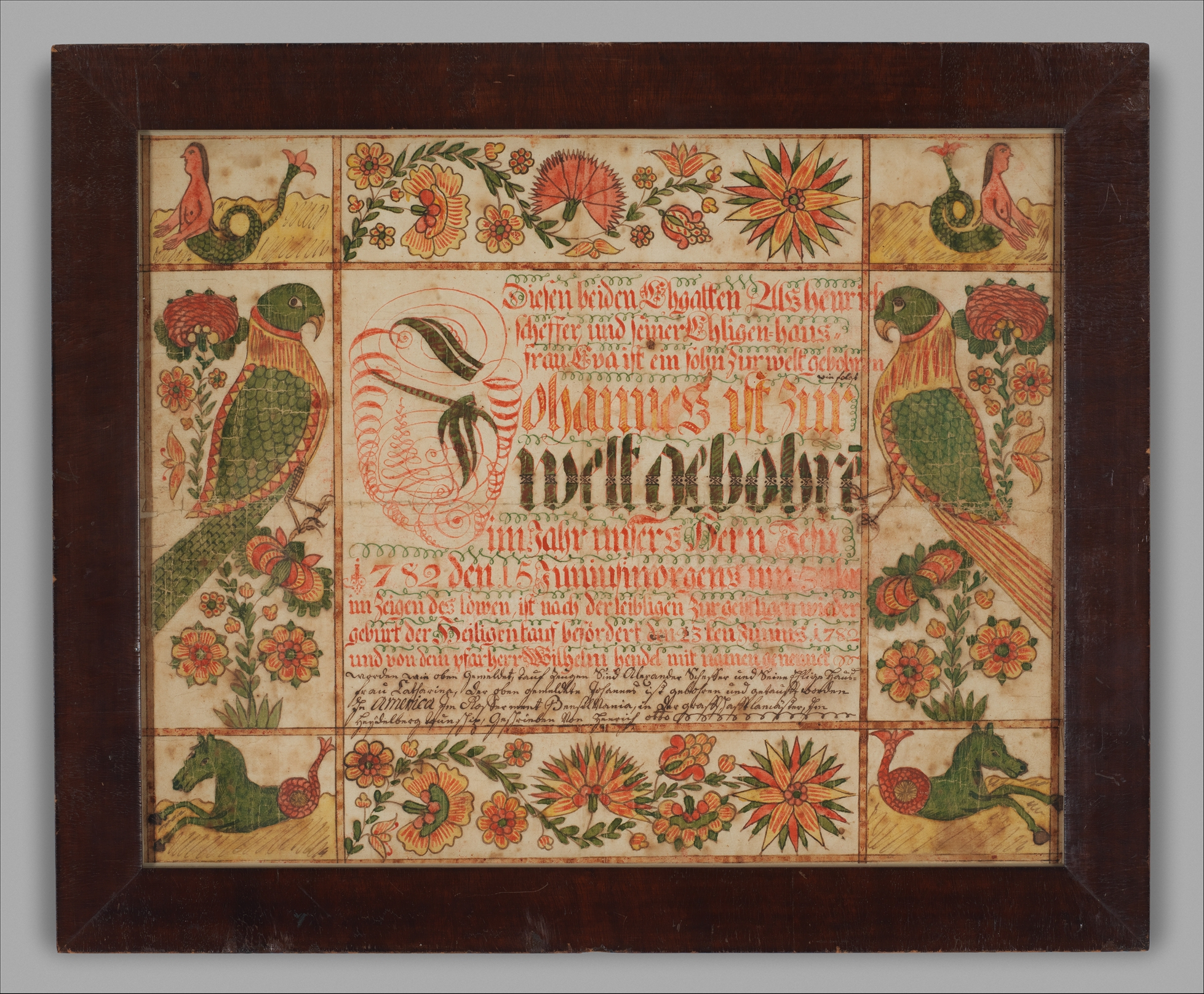
Birth and Baptismal Certificate

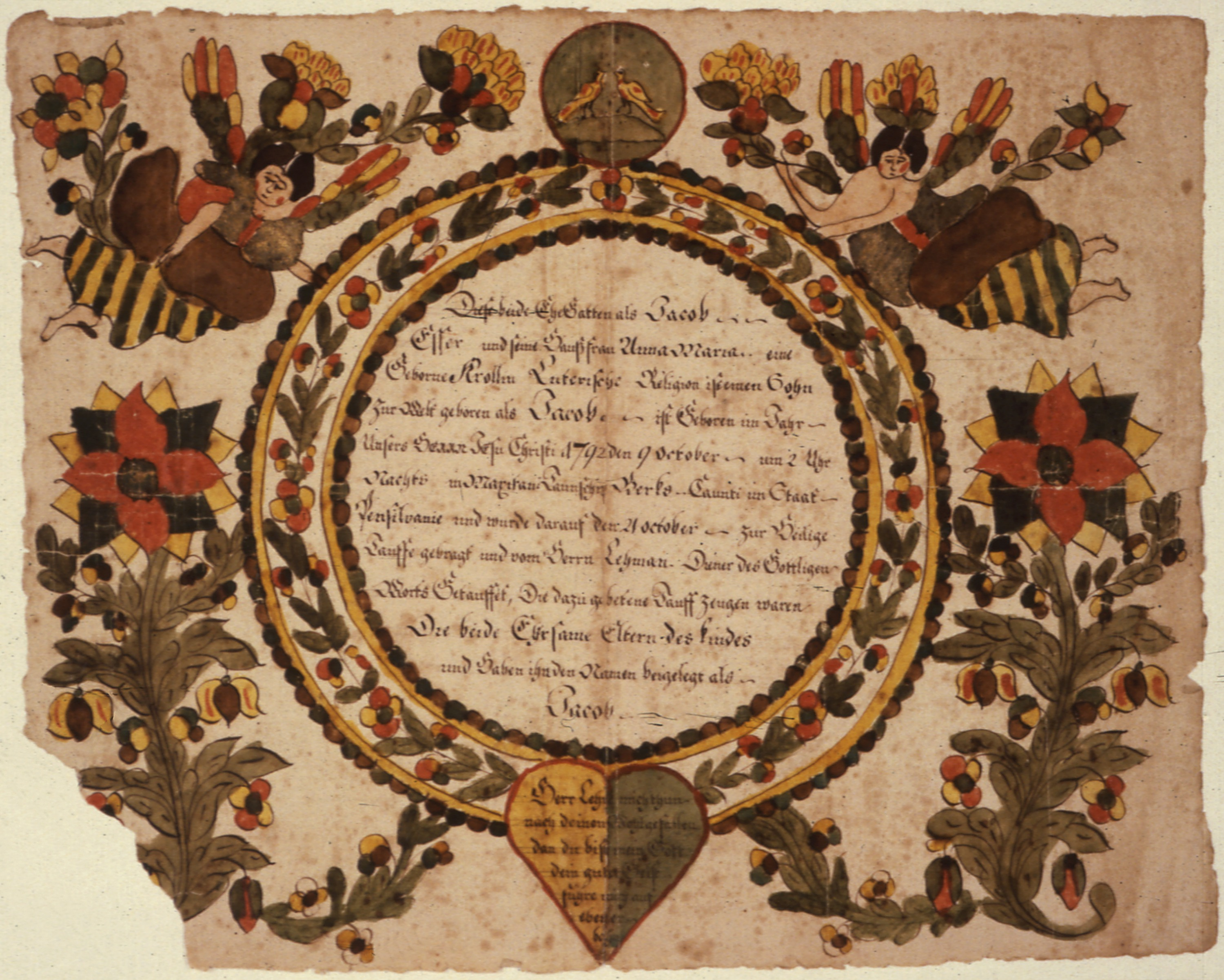
Fraktur of the Family of Jacob Esser

Fraktur art was a decorative illumination element for documents such as poems, religious texts, birth and baptismal certificates, and furniture. It was primarily practiced in Pennsylvania by the Pennsylvania Dutch, and was named after the fraktur script it commonly accompanied. Artists typically used a goose quill as a primary tool to outline and draw onto their mediums while using a brush made from cat hair to put the colors down. Fraktur art is closely related to calligraphy, not only in the similar use of tools but also in the dependence on the line to create dimension and shape within the artworks. All the elements within the artwork are outlined with a black calligraphic line to enhance the dimensionality of the element by providing layered details onto the flat colors laid down, while also contrasting it against the often pale background and monochromatic text. However, the lack of expressive brushwork, texture and shading resulted in an overall flatness by enhancing the two dimensionality of the artworks. The main subject matter of these fraktur artworks often consisted of birds, animals and flower motifs within a floral arrangement that encircled the text as a border.

==== Appalachian painting ====
Appalachian painting is a diverse collection of related styles that incorporate influence from Native American, African-American, and European traditions. Commonalities in Appalachian painting include making materials from what can be found locally, graining and marbling to imitate rare and costly woods and marbles, and painting landscapes as well as local folklore and legends. These paintings were often displayed prominently indoors, and formed the focal point for many both public and private interior spaces. Franklin D. Roosevelt's New Deal programs in the 30s and 40s provided support and employment for many Appalachian painters in that time, which lead to the creation of many new paintings and murals. One prominent modern Appalachian folk painter is Mike Ousley, whose work draws on stories and folklore he has heard and experienced throughout his life in eastern Kentucky.

==== Barn quilts ====
Barn quilts are a type of folk art found in the United States (particularly the South and Midwest) and Canada. They take the patterns of traditional quilt squares, and recreate them either directly on the side of a barn or on a piece of wood or aluminum which is then attached to the side of a barn. Patterns are sometimes modeled off of family quilts, loved ones, patriotic themes, or important crops to the farm. The origins of the barn quilt are contested- some claim they date back almost 300 years, but some claim they were invented by Donna Sue Groves of Adams County, Ohio in 2001. Their origin is likely connected to barn advertisements. Many rural counties will display their barn quilts as part of a quilt trail, creating a route that connects barns with barn quilts to sponsor local tourism.

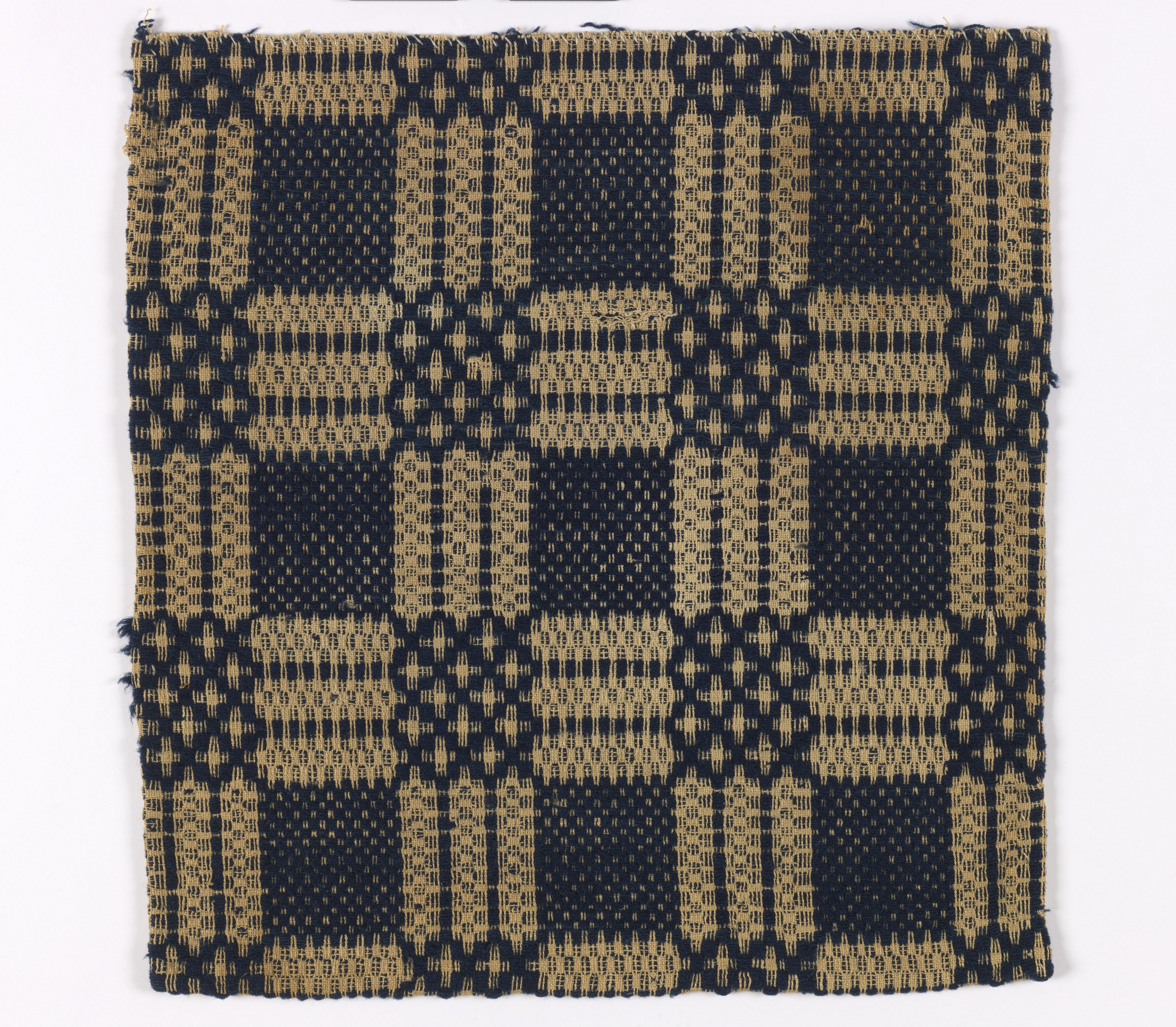
A fragment of a mountain coverlet from the late 18th-early 19th century. The pattern is known as the 'Cross of Tennessee.'

=== Textile art ===
Textile arts have historically been one of the most common forms of folk art, as spinning and weaving were daily necessities. Common types of textile art include quilting, coverlets, and many others. Textile arts were (and to a certain extent still are) predominantly done by women, for function, enjoyment, and for extra income. They would use local home-grown flax and cotton as materials, and colored their fabrics with either natural or store-bought dyes. Coverlet weaving (called 'mountain coverlets' in Appalachia) was a particularly prized craft, as it took the most effort and skill and was most able to express the weaver's personality and creativity.

The rise of mail-order catalogues and mass-produced consumer goods in Appalachia initially threatened traditional textile arts, but almost as soon as they arrived, regional movements to preserve textile arts sprung up. The 1920s and 30s produced many of these organizations, such as the Arrowcraft Shop, the John C. Campbell Folk School, the Southern Highland Handicraft Guild, and the Tennessee Association of Craft Artists (TACA).

Traditional quilting inspired the more recent tradition of barn quilts, which are not textiles but quilt patterns painted or affixed to the sides of barns.

=== Basketry ===
Basketry has most likely been practiced in North America for as long as humans have lived in North America. The traditions and styles of basketry are extremely diverse, but most include working with materials that are common in the area the basket is being produced in. Two prominent styles of baskets from Appalachia include slat baskets and rib baskets.

=== Pottery ===
Similar to basketry, pottery has been practiced in North America for as long as humans have inhabited it. The Catawba Nation is generally recognized as having the longest standing pottery-making tradition, and their pottery techniques have influenced both other Indigenous groups and White and Black settlers in the area.

=== Woodcarving ===
Woodcarving, being both a practical skill and an art form, is extremely widespread throughout North America. There are many different types of woodcarving, and purely recreational woodcarving is often called 'whittling.'

==== Ship carving ====
Ships were almost always adorned with some type of wood carving, be that a figurehead, a sternboard, a gangway board, or any other number of different places that could have aesthetic value. The figurehead of a ship was often the most ornately carved, being thought of as an expression of the mission, purpose, and spirit of the vessel. They would usually be women, but they could also be men, animals (eagles were particularly common), or other designs. A replacement for a figurehead that was smaller and did not depict any creatures was called a billethead.

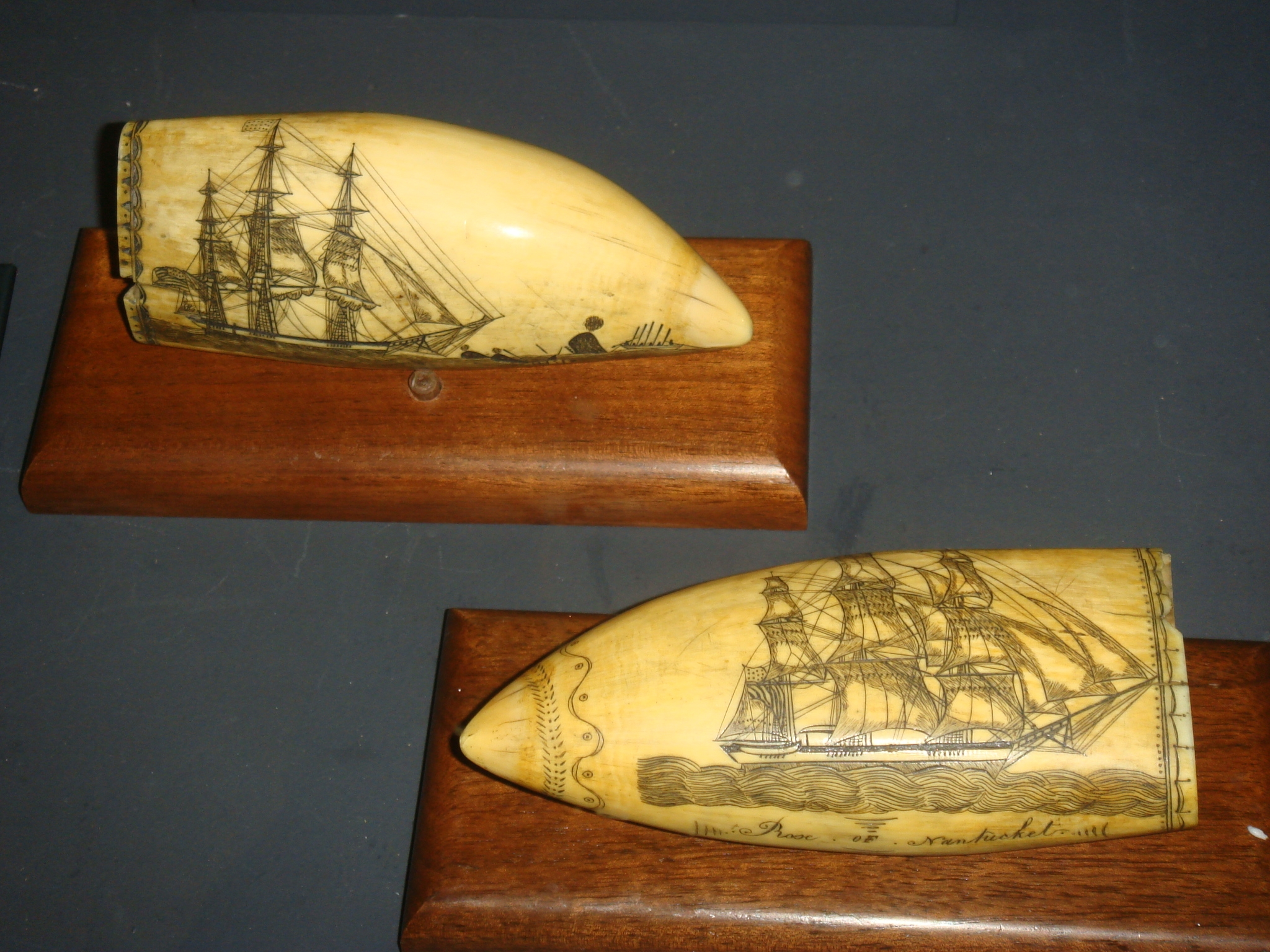
A set of two scrimshaws created by Nantucket whaler Edward Burdett

==== Scrimshaws ====
Although not a type of wood-carving, scrimshaws were carvings done by sailors into bone or ivory, typically whale teeth from the catch of whaling ships. Whale bone was easy to carve into, and was plentiful as it was generally not a product that was taken back and sold the way whale oil and meat was. Whalers generally had lots of free time in between whale sightings, so scrimshaw carving was one creative pursuit they found to fill that time. It was most commonly done by New England whalers.

==== Fish decoys ====
Fish decoys are wooden models of fish that are used to attract fish when ice fishing. They have been created by Indigenous peoples for thousands of years in northern North America, and today are made and used mostly in the Great Lakes region. Although their primary purpose is functional, artisans have taken and continue to take great pride in the art and design of their fish decoys, with styles ranging from photorealistic to stylized with Northern European folk art patterns. The hobby of producing and collecting fish decoys grew in popularity during the Great Depression era, and is still practiced today.

== Artists ==
Most American folk artists were self taught, and painters often worked as portrait makers to generate income. An example of this can be seen by Rufus Hathaway (1770-1822) who worked as a self taught portrait painter for five years. The nature of American folk art not relying on a traditional education in the arts meant there was a greater range of backgrounds among the artists that produced pieces of art in this movement. This means that there were many variations in the appearance of folk art. Although there were similar motifs and techniques across artworks, this variation made certain artists' pieces more difficult to identify or to categorize. For example, the variation in Ammi Phillips' (1788–1865) artworks once led art historians to believe his pieces were produced by several people.

The artists operating within this style tended to also rely on another profession to make a sufficient living. Some artists had to stop producing pieces in a professional capacity due to a lack of income. Artists with dual professions would draw from their experiences from their secondary profession to inform their method of art creation. Artists such as Edward Hicks (1780–1849) and Sheldon Peck (1797–1868) both had to find another source of income to support their art career, the latter becoming a farmer and the former working as a preacher. Rufus Hathaway would also stop producing art as a career by switching professions to a doctor. Following his death, his eulogy would mention how a lack of income played a part in informing his decision to stop creating art. Artists such as Ammi Phillips were the outliers in this regard; he would maintain art as his only profession the entire time he produced pieces professionally.

Of the better recognized artists, most of them worked in cities producing portraits for the inhabitants. Some traveled to other cities or states to continue their work once a population's demand for portraits reduced, such as Sheldon Peck and Ammi Phillips who both left their homes to continue producing art pieces.

Quaker artists who participated within this art style generally did not produce religious pieces, as English protestantism opposed the creation of religious art. Edward Hicks did not subscribe to this belief, as he began making pieces that he believed would spread the gospel. He was therefore able to merge careers and be both a preacher and artist simultaneously.

Better known artists were usually born into families who had experience within artisan or craft industries. Several would be born into families that had local political influence or enjoyed a higher standard of living due to a high demand for their services. The artist Edward Hicks was born into a family that had been loyal to the English Monarchy during the revolutionary war due to his role in local governance. There is thus some evidence to suggest that prominent folk-artists were of higher social standings, but artists generally came from a wide range of socio-economic backgrounds.

== Women folk artists ==
Without formal academic training as a prerequisite to a folk artist’s success, the art form gained popularity among those who were often denied such training, including women. Although the schooling of women in 18-19th century America was widespread in areas such as New England, the curriculum remained limited. The principal scope of sending young girls to school was to enhance their religious astuteness and knowledge of biblical texts. As such, the majority of scholastic projects undertaken by female students involved the deciphering of texts, but not the creation of their own. In fact, despite being able to read, most women could not write. Other similar creative and expressive pursuits were discouraged in academic settings, meaning women artists were often self-taught.

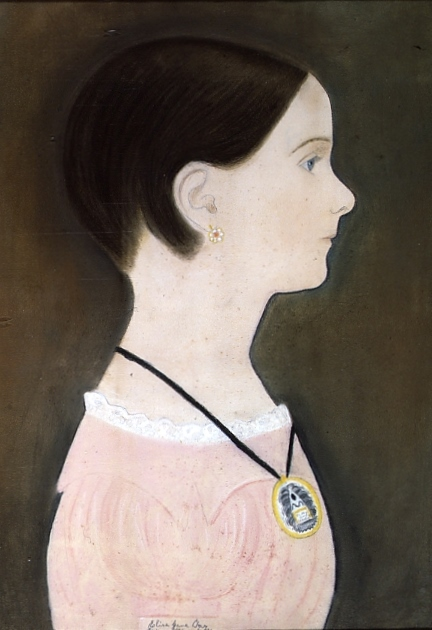
Eliza Jane Fay (1840) by Ruth Henshaw Bascom, Fenimore Art Museum

Once women completed their studies, marriage and subjugation to the domestic sphere was customary. Wives would often engage in small-scale production of textiles for commercial sale and domestic use. This allowed them to cultivate the artistic skills and craftsmanship both required to satisfy their role in society (clothing the children, making bedsheets, decorating the home) and to create art. Embroidery was thus a commonly employed medium of folk-art pieces made by women artists such as Sarah Ann Garges (c. 1834–c. 1887). Her piece, “Appliqué Bedcover (1853),” features pastoral motifs which represent her rural upbringing in Pennsylvania.

The appliance of practical skills associated with 19th century womanhood to the creation of folk-art is also evident in the widespread use of wool thread. For example, in her work “Adam and Eve (1835)”, Helen Shaw uses wool thread on wool ground to portray the biblical story. As critical acclaim was not often afforded to women artists, many of their artworks were made as gifts for family and friends, such as Shaw’s textile art.

As most women were confined to using techniques and tools that were culturally acceptable such as needle and thread, entering male dominated mediums such as easel painting could be difficult. Those women who were successful in doing so were usually from wealthier backgrounds and could therefore receive professional schooling in visual arts. Middle and upper-class women did not need to rely on domestically available mediums such as stitching and embroidery and instead experimented with high quality art materials which granted them greater validity as artists. One of the more prominent woman folk artists of 18-19th century America is Eunice Pinney. She used watercolors to paint genre scenes and mourning pictures, mainly featuring upper-class people and settings. Her and her contemporary Mary Ann Wilson are considered some of the first Americans to use the medium of watercolor.

Ruth Henshaw Bascom (1772–1884) was another established female folk artist. Her compositions are almost exclusively portraits, of which she produced over 1,400. Portraiture became popular among women artists who would often use children and relatives in the home as models. Their art thus emphasized community and family involvement. Other prominent women folk artists of the 18–19th century who specialized in portraiture include Susan Waters and Emily Eastman.
