= Zilpha =

Zilpha is a given name. Close variations include Zilphia and Zilpah. Notable people with the name include:

- Zilpah, mother of Gad and Asher in the book of Genesis
- Zilpah P. Grant Banister (1794–1874), American educator
- Zilpha Carruthers Franklin (1897–1975), American journalist, editor, government official
- Zilpha Drew Smith (1852–1926), American social worker
- Zilpha Elaw (c. 1790 – 1873), American Methodist missionary and writer
- Zilpha Grant (1919–2011), English freestyle swimmer who competed for Great Britain in the 1936 Summer Olympics
- Zilphia Horton (1910–1956), American musician, folklorist, activist
- Zilpher Jennings (1928–1961), American Samoan politician
- Zilpha Keatley Snyder (1927-2014), author of books for children and young adults

== Fictional characters ==
- Zilpha Geary, played by Oona Chaplin in Taboo
