= Old Town Hall Historic District (Duxbury, Massachusetts) =

Historic district in Massachusetts, United States

- U.S. National Register of Historic Places
- U.S. Historic district
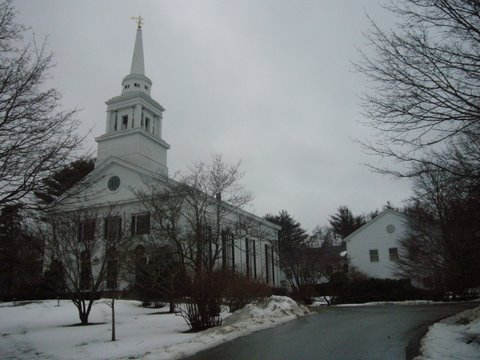
- The First Parish Church

- Location within Massachusetts Location within the United States
- Location: 774, 842, 862, and 878 Tremont St., Duxbury, Massachusetts
- Coordinates: 42°2′8″N 70°41′30″W
- Architect: Multiple
- Architectural style: Greek Revival
- NRHP reference No.: 100006129
- Added to NRHP: February 11, 2001

The Old Town Hall Historic District is a historic district on Tremont Street in Duxbury, Massachusetts. The district includes the town's Greek Revival town hall (built 1840), the Greek Revival First Parish Church, and the 18th-century Mayflower Cemetery. The district was added to the National Register of Historic Places in 2021 for its architecture and local historical significance.

== Description and history ==
Duxbury's Old Town Hall is located among a cluster of municipal and religious facilities on the west side of Tremont Street (Massachusetts Route 3A). It is a 1 1/2-story frame building, with a gabled roof and clapboarded exterior. Its entrance is set in a recess supported by Doric columns set in antes, and flanked by similarly styled pilasters. The interior houses town offices. Adjacent is a similar building, built in 1975 to house more town offices. To the left of the municipal property is the town's First Parish Church, another fine example of Greek Revival architecture built in 1841. The Mayflower Cemetery, established in 1787 lies beyond the church.

Duxbury was founded by the Pilgrim settlers of the Plymouth Colony, and was incorporated in 1637. Its original municipal center was on Chestnut Street in South Duxbury, where its first two meeting houses stood. The third meeting house was built on the site of the First Parish Church in 1787, marking the movement of town facilities inland from the coast. The Old Town Hall was built in 1840, and was the first of three strongly Greek Revival buildings on the site. The church was built in 1841, and Partridge Academy was built in 1844 on the site now occupied by the 1975 building.

== See also ==
- National Register of Historic Places listings in Plymouth County, Massachusetts
