= Zilpha Drew Smith =

American social worker

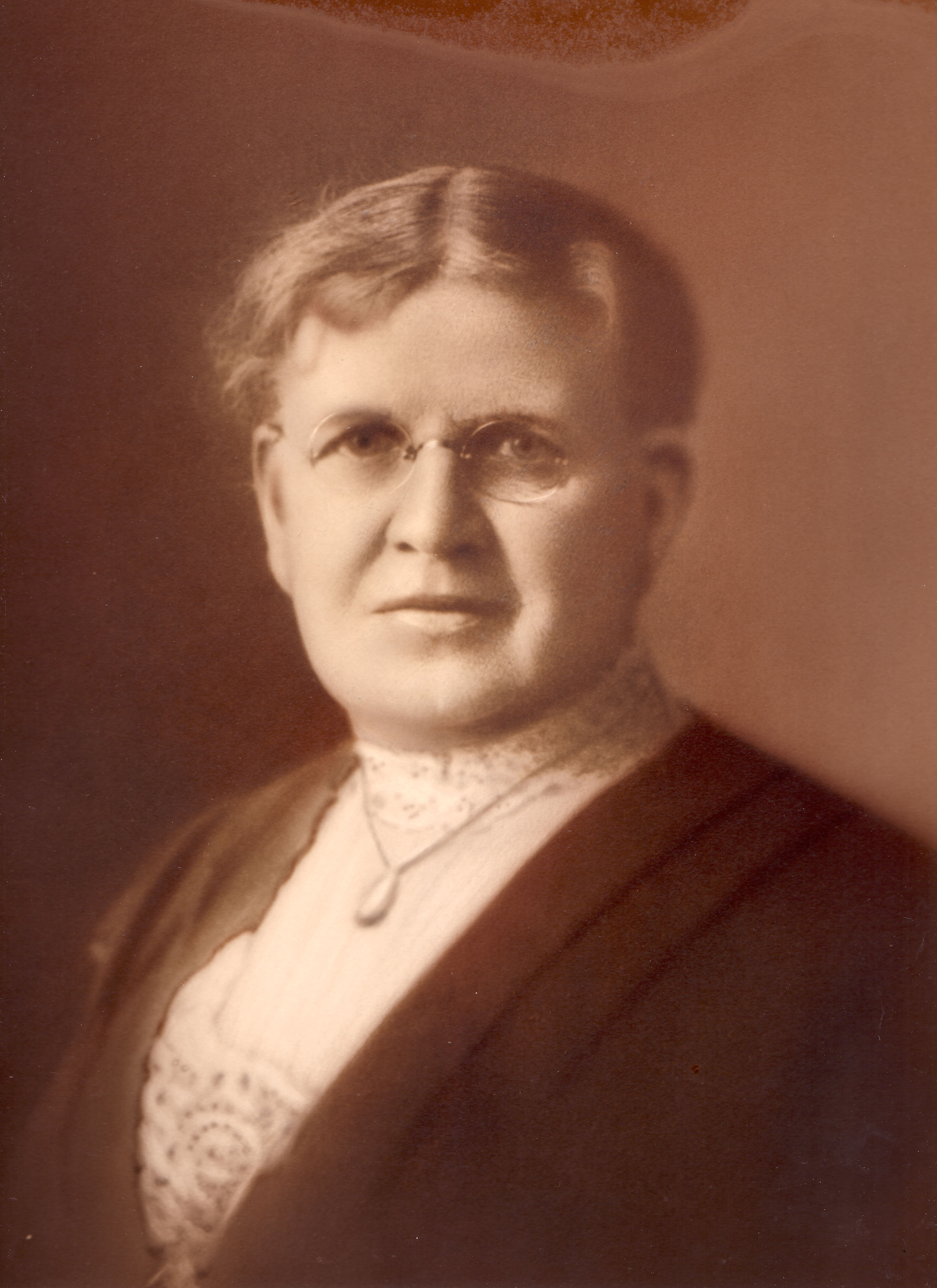
Zilpha Drew Smith

Zilpha Drew Smith (1852 – 1926) was an American social worker. She was a leading figure in the charity organization movement and in the professionalization of social work, in Boston and across the nation.

== Early life and education ==
Smith was born on January 25, 1852, in Pembroke, Massachusetts, to Silvanus and Judith Winsor Smith. Her parents were involved in numerous social causes including abolitionism, education, temperance, and women's suffrage, She graduated from the Boston Girls' High and Normal School in 1868.

== Career ==
Her first employment was as a telegraph operator. She subsequently revised the Probate Court index for Suffolk County. She volunteered, alongside her mother, in relief efforts to care for victims of the Great Boston Fire of 1872; the experience led her towards a career in social work.

Smith joined the Associated Charities of Boston as Head of the Office Staff in 1879 and became its General Secretary in 1886. At that organization, she applied new theories about "charity organization." The charity organization movement aimed to coordinate private agencies in order to use their resources efficiently to ameliorate urban poverty. Under her administrative leadership, the Associated Charities of Boston successfully brought together the majority of the private charitable and relief organizations in the city. Smith developed a centralized office to coordinate unpaid and paid workers. She emphasized record-keeping and shared information. Smith created a system for volunteer "friendly visitors" to assist the needy, as well as a method for applicants to request aid. Smith believed in the value of personal relationships between privileged volunteers and impoverished clients, especially as a means of imparting middle-class values to the poorer classes, At the same time, she encouraged volunteers and paid workers to learn from one another, particularly through district-based committees. Smith championed supervision and training classes in social work. Though she increased central oversight, the district retained considerable authority within her innovative administrative structure.

Smith's influence extended far beyond Boston. Other cities emulated the Associated Charities model she established. In 1888, she and Charles W. Birtwell (of the Boston Children's Aid Society) founded a group for Bostonians interested in social service, bringing together both volunteers and professionals for discussion. The Monday Evening Club was the first such group in the U.S. and a forerunner of social workers' professional associations.

Smith often spoke at the National Conference of Charities and Correction, beginning with it gathering in St. Louis, Missouri, in 1884. In 1892, she gave an address on "The Education of the Friendly Visitor," in which she reflected on the relationships between volunteers and professionals, as well as between social workers and clients. Smith said:

We are apt in beginning to be so occupied with our own attitude toward the poor people that we forget to ask ourselves what their attitude toward us may be. . . . . We do personal work among the poor, we say; but do we make the poor people feel that it is personal to them? We can make it so by really giving ourselves, not merely our thought and care in their affairs, but telling them from the first something of our own. "Tell them about yourself and your family," is good advice to a visitor. If some one is sick, the mother or sister will be interested to hear about your friends who have recovered from the same disease. All your affairs will be quite as interesting to them as theirs to you, and any confidence you can give will inspire confidence in return.

In 1900, Smith lectured at the New York School of Philanthropy. She also produced several books. One production, from 1901, studied 234 wives deserted by their husbands, from research conducted by the Associated Charities of Boston.

Smith had a lifelong collaborative relationship with another social work pioneer, Mary Richmond. At first Richmond looked to Smith for mentorship but over time they came to see one another as colleagues and eventually close friends. Richmond applied Smith's charitable organization approach in her own city of Baltimore, Maryland.

From 1904 to 1918, she was the Associate Director of the new Boston School of Social Work maintained by Simmons College and Harvard University, overseeing the expansion of its curriculum and the use of case records in social work education.

== Death ==
Zilpha Drew Smith died in Boston in 1926 and was buried in the Mayflower Cemetery, Duxbury, Massachusetts.
