= Judith Winsor Smith =

American women's suffrage activist and social reformer

- Born: Judith Winsor McLauthlin; November 26, 1821; Marshfield, Massachusetts, U.S.
- Died: December 12, 1921 (aged 100); Boston, U.S.
- Known for: Women's suffrage activism
- Spouse: Silvanus Smith
- Children: Sidney, Frances, Zilpha, Mary, Erasmus, Jennie

Judith Winsor Smith (née McLauthlin; November 26, 1821 – December 12, 1921) was an American women's suffrage activist, social reformer, and abolitionist. She was involved in the suffrage movement until the Nineteenth Amendment was passed in 1920, when she voted for the first time at the age of 99. She was a founder and the first president of the Home Club of East Boston, one of the first women's clubs in Massachusetts.

== Personal life ==
Judith Winsor McLauthlin was born in Marshfield, Massachusetts, on November 26, 1821, to Lewis and Polly (née Hathaway) McLauthlin. Both of her parents were descendants of people who had arrived on the Mayflower. Her father was the groundskeeper for the shipbuilder Ezra Weston, and her maternal grandfather was the physician and painter Rufus Hathaway. She moved to Duxbury, Massachusetts as a young woman to take a teaching job. In 1841 (or 1842) she married an East Boston shipbuilder named Silvanus (or Sylvanus) Smith, and the couple had six children. Her daughter Zilpha Drew Smith became a prominent social worker in Boston.

The family lived for several years in Duxbury and then Pembroke before moving to East Boston in 1854. In 1871 they built a home at 76 White Street in East Boston, overlooking the Border Street shipyards. Towards the end of her life she went to live with her daughter at 11 Roanoke Avenue in Jamaica Plain. She died there on December 12, 1921, aged 100.

== Activism ==
=== Abolitionism ===
Smith was on the Standing Committee of the congregation led by abolitionist Theodore Parker, and was involved in the abolitionist movement. (Note: See her papers for specifics. "The correspondence and diaries are primarily of a personal nature, although occasional letters and diary entries mention her involvement with the suffrage and anti-slavery movements.")

In a 1920 Boston Globe interview, Smith claimed that her father had been an abolitionist and "had a station on the underground railway." Lewis McLauthlin was a vice president of the Old Colony Anti-Slavery Society, and served on its finance committee. In 1859 he unsuccessfully petitioned the Massachusetts legislature "to enact that no person, who has been held as a slave, shall be delivered up, by any officer or court, State or Federal, within this Commonwealth, to anyone claiming him on the ground that he owes 'service or labor' to such claimant, by the laws of one of the Slave States of this Union."

=== Home Club of East Boston ===
Smith was a founder and the first president of the Home Club of East Boston. Established in 1875, the Home Club was the second women's club in Massachusetts. At their first meeting, the thirty women members were addressed by the noted suffragist Julia Ward Howe. Later that year, the club women successfully petitioned the Massachusetts legislature for an amendment to the state law regarding "nightwalking," so that men would be subject to it as well as women. They established a sewing school for girls, raised funds for various charities, and sent delegates to national women's club conventions. The club met monthly at Smith's home until it outgrew that space, and they began meeting at a local hall. Smith was president of the club for ten years.

=== Women's suffrage ===
When Smith cast her first vote for president in 1920, she had been active in the women's suffrage movement for over 70 years. She served for many years as president of the East Boston Woman Suffrage League, was on the executive committees of the Massachusetts, New England, and American Woman Suffrage Associations, and was a director of the New England Women's Club. She was a friend of noted suffragists Julia Ward Howe, Lucy Stone, and Henry B. Blackwell.

She petitioned the Massachusetts state legislature for women's right to vote in town and municipal elections in 1885, and to vote in primaries and caucuses for the nomination of school committee candidates in 1905.

At the age of 89, Smith stood outside the polls for two hours on election day, handing out suffrage leaflets. Alice Stone Blackwell was so impressed she wrote Smith a poem for her 90th birthday:

For two long hours on election day, not long ago
She stood where the voters streamed past in a row
And gave suffrage leaflets to all who would take them
Now isn't she plucky, and good as they make them?

She joined the New England Women's Club in 1873, and was honored by them at a reception just a few weeks before her death in 1921. She also helped organize the Dorchester Club and the Fortnightly Club of Winchester.

== Legacy ==
Most of her papers are held by the Massachusetts Historical Society. Some are in the Woman's Rights Collection of the Schlesinger Library. Family records are also in the Drew Archival Library of the Duxbury Rural and Historical Society. She is remembered on the Jamaica Plain walk of the Boston Women's Heritage Trail.
