= Rufus Hathaway =

American physician and painter (1770–1822)

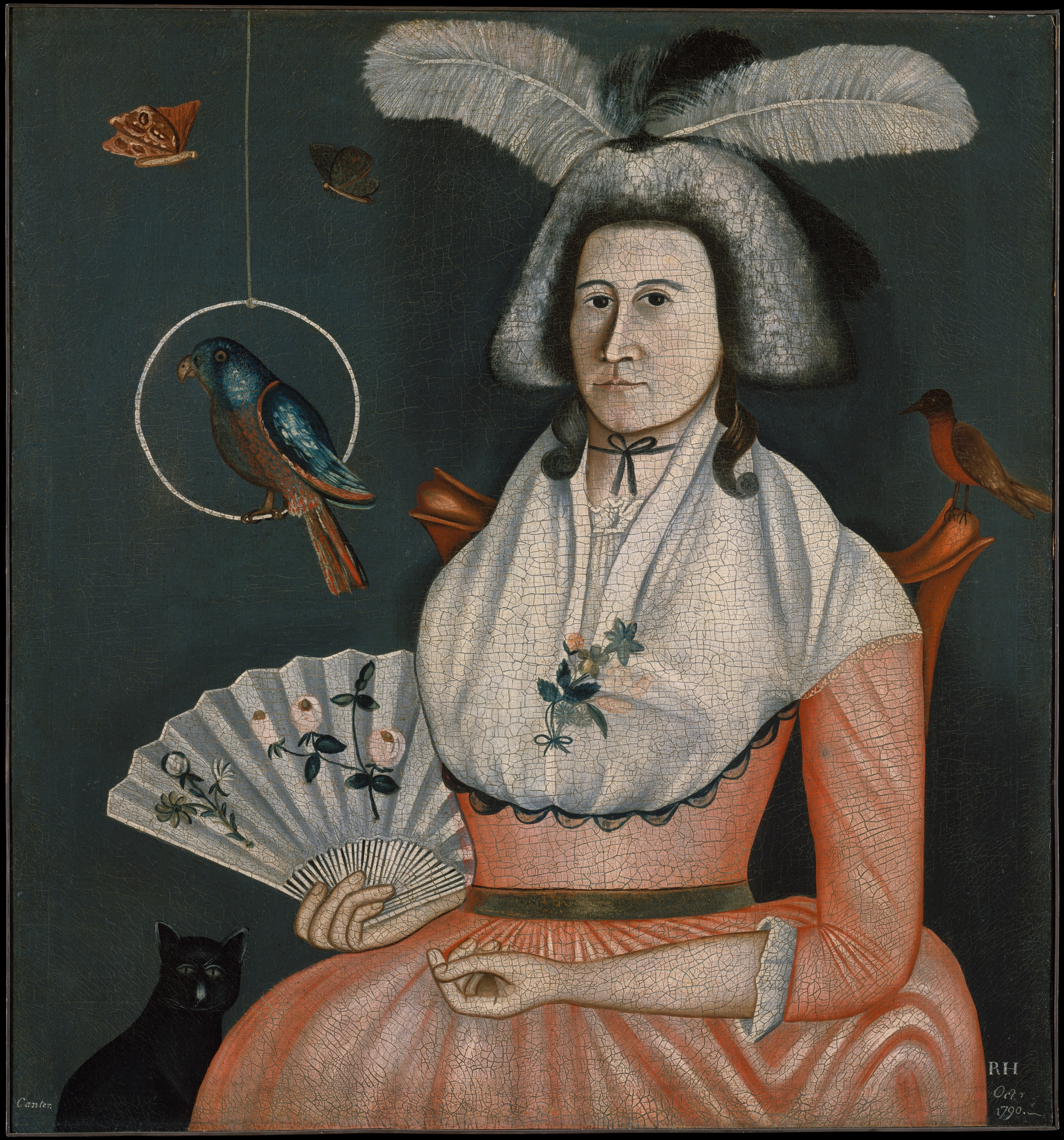
Lady with Her Pets, 1790, Metropolitan Museum of Art

Rufus Hathaway (1770–1822) was an American medical doctor and folk art painter. He lived in southern Massachusetts, where he painted numerous portraits between 1790 and 1795. He later studied medicine and established himself as a doctor at Duxbury.

Hathway was born in Freetown, Massachusetts, and was the eldest of six children born to Asa Hathaway and Mary Phillips; his father and grandfather were ship carpenters. The family moved several times, settling in Bristol, Rhode Island in the mid-1780s. The source of Hathaway's artistic training is unknown, though it is believed he may have worked as a decorative artist or apprentice ship-carver; as a painter he appears to have been self-taught. He is known to have been active in the vicinity of Taunton, Massachusetts in 1790. Hathaway arrived in Duxbury in 1791, and began painting portraits of members of locally prominent families. In 1795 he married Judith Winsor, the daughter of a locally important merchant. He took up medicine at this time, possibly at the behest of his new wife's family, studying with Dr. Isaac Winslow of Marshfield. He seems to have abandoned painting, as very few works by his hand are known after the time of his marriage, although paintings dating to as late as 1808 have been documented. Hathaway had twelve children by Judith; at one time the only physician in Duxbury, he was highly respected in the field, and was elected Honorary Fellow of the Massachusetts Medical Society shortly before his death. One of his granddaughters was the abolitionist and suffragist Judith Winsor Smith, and surgeon Frederick Winsor was a great-nephew.

Thirty-three portraits by Hathaway are known to exist, dating almost exclusively to the years between 1790 and 1795; all are of relatives and friends, among them the educator and politician George Partridge. He also painted landscapes, portrait miniatures, and overmantels. One genre painting, the Welch Curate of about 1800, is documented; it was adapted from an English mezzotint. Furthermore, he is known to have created at least one wood carving, a figure of an eagle used to crown a temporary arch constructed to inaugurate a new bridge over the Bluefish River, and he carved the frames to some of his paintings.

Hathaway died of a hernia incurred while lifting a patient, traditionally held to be Ezra Weston, and is buried in the Mayflower Cemetery in Duxbury. His epitaph, which he may have composed himself, relates to his career as a physician. He was survived by Judith, who would go on to live to be 102, and left his heirs a little more than 700 pounds at his death.

A bill of sale for six portraits of the Weston family exists, dating to 1793; it indicates that the paintings cost six pounds, and that Hathaway charged a further three shillings for the frame on the portrait of Ezra Weston. In 2006, a pair of portraits, of Josiah Dean III and his wife, Sarah, were sold at Sotheby's, together fetching $380,000.

== Selected works ==
- Lady with Her Pets, 1790, Metropolitan Museum of Art: his earliest known work
- Joseph Robertson Tolman, c. 1795, formerly Whitney Museum of American Art, New York (sold 1999)
- Sylvia Church Weston Sampson, 1793, Yale University Art Gallery, New Haven, Connecticut
- Lucy Winsor, c. 1794, Baltimore Museum of Art, Baltimore, Maryland
- Joshua Winsor (1748–1827), 1793, formerly New England Historic Genealogical Society, Boston, Massachusetts (sold)
- Seth Winsor, c. 1793–95, RISD Museum
- A View of Mr. Joshua Winsor's House & c., c. 1793–95, American Folk Art Museum
- three portraits (of Ezra Weston II, his wife Jerusha, and his daughter Maria), Abby Aldrich Rockefeller Folk Art Museum (attributed)
