= Emily Eastman =

American painter

- Born: 1804; Loudon, New Hampshire
- Died: Unknown
- Years active: 1820–1830

Emily Eastman was an early 19th century American painter. A watercolor painter, Eastman produced a series of bust portraits of fashionable women in Loudon, New Hampshire.

== Personal ==
Eastman was born in Loudon, New Hampshire, in 1804. She married Dr. Daniel Baker in 1824. Not much else is known about her personal life; what little information is recorded about her has been gleaned from inscriptions on her drawings.

== Paintings ==
Eastman painted watercolor bust portraits of women in the style of fashion plates, a popular medium seen in women's magazines of the period.

Rather than painting her subjects in thin outlines of watercolor, Eastman drew her subjects in graphite and then filled in different areas with washes of rich color. Eastman rarely signed her paintings, similar to other contemporary folk artists. However, those that are unsigned can be identified "speculatively as her work on the basis of such similarities as prominent thin, delicately arched eyebrows, small bowed mouths, and elaborate coiffures of tight curls crowned by jewelry, flowers, and other adornments."

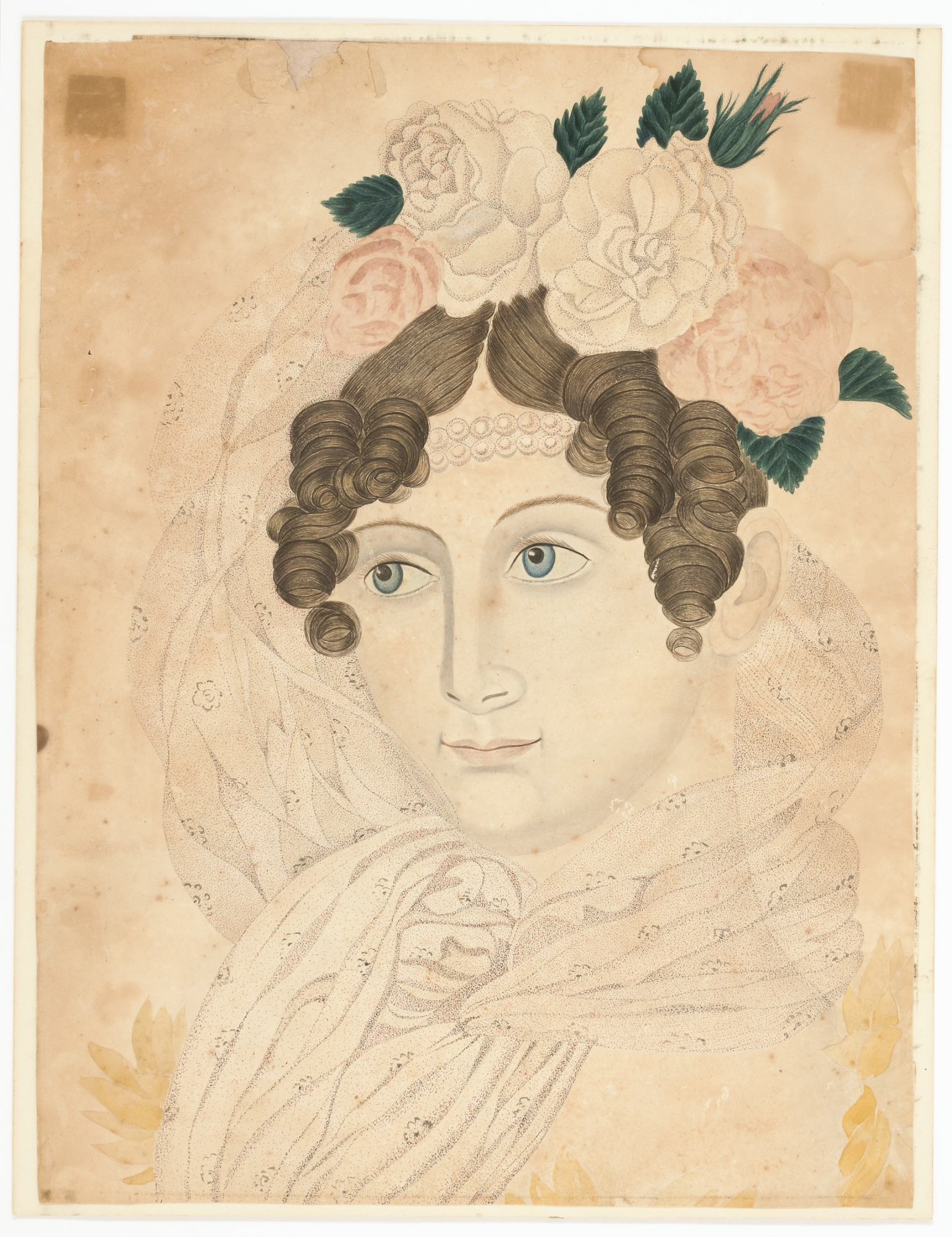
Woman with Roses in Hair (1820-1824)

Eastman's paintings have been—or currently are—on display in the Smithsonian American Art Museum, the National Gallery of Art, the Museum of Fine Arts in Boston, the American Folk Art Museum, and the Terra Museum of American Art.
