= Zilpha Carruthers Franklin =

American editor (1897–1975)

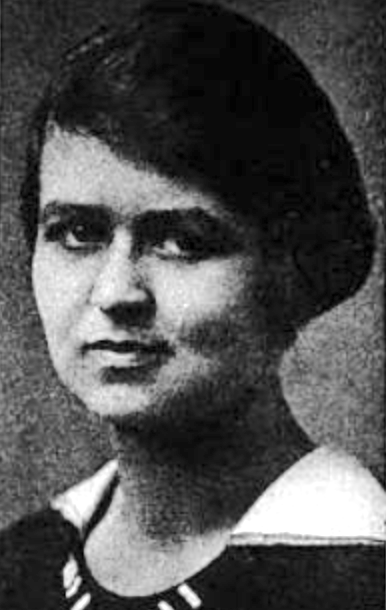
- Zilpha Carruthers Franklin, from a 1922 publication
- Born: Zilpha Mary Carruthers; September 1, 1897; Denver, Colorado
- Died: June 6, 1975; Washington, D.C.
- Occupation(s): Writer, editor, federal official

Zilpha Mary Carruthers Franklin (September 1, 1897 – June 6, 1975) was an American writer, editor, and federal official. In 1943, she was named chief information officer of the Federal Security Agency, the first woman to hold that title at a federal agency.

== Early life and education ==
Zilpha Mary Carruthers was born in Denver, Colorado, the daughter of Arthur Chapin Carruthers and Bertha Wilcox Carruthers. She graduated from the University of Colorado in 1918, with further studies at the University of Geneva and the London School of Economics. She earned a master's degree from the Columbia University Graduate School of Journalism in 1925, with a master's thesis titled "Through John Bull's Looking Glass: A Study of the Relations Between England and America as Reflected in the Periodical Press between 1830 and 1840." She held a Pulitzer Traveling Scholarship in 1922.

== Career ==
Franklin was a freelance journalist as a young woman, based in New York City. She was an editorial assistant at the American Child Health Association in the mid-1920s. She edited Child Study, the monthly magazine of the Child Study Association of America, from 1928 to 1935. In 1943, Franklin was named chief information officer of the Federal Security Agency, and remained in that position until 1953, when she resigned after disagreements with Oveta Culp Hobby, and took a public relations job in Toledo, Ohio. From 1954 to 1962, she worked for the National Health Council on promoting health careers.

== Publications ==
Franklin's byline regularly appeared in Parents' Magazine, Child Health Magazine, and National Municipal Review, among other publications. She also wrote a children's book, The Path of the Gopatis (1926), for the National Dairy Council.

- "Adventures in Health Education" (1924)
- "The Technique of Poster-Making" (1924)
- "Our Immaculate Canal Zone" (1924)
- "Between Whistles Milk; Factory Workers Like Milk and Demand More at Home" (1924)
- "Seen in Mansfield; An Expert Looks at Health Education" (1924)
- The Path of the Gopatis (1926)
- "Does Behavior Depend on Health?" (1929)
- "Can One Influence an Unborn Child?" (1930, with Thomas Woods)
- "When is a Family a Success?" (1931)
- "Just Teasing" (1932)
- "Discipline: Strict or Lax?" (1934, with Goodwin Watson)
- "Little Known Facts about Grandparents" (1934)
- "The School and Social Security" (1937)
- "Public Assistance in Relation to Municipal Welfare Problems" (1937)
- "Extension of Old-Age Insurance" (1939)
- "Impact of National Defense on Family Life" (1942)
- "On the Local Front" (1943)
- "A Place in the Summer Sun" (1944)
- "Community Services" (1945)

== Personal life ==
Carruthers married journalist Ben A. Franklin in 1923. They had a son, Ben, who became a reporter for The New York Times, and a daughter, Zilpha Jane. Her husband died in 1935, when their children will both young. She died in 1975, at the age of 77.
