= Erastus Salisbury Field =

American painter

External videos
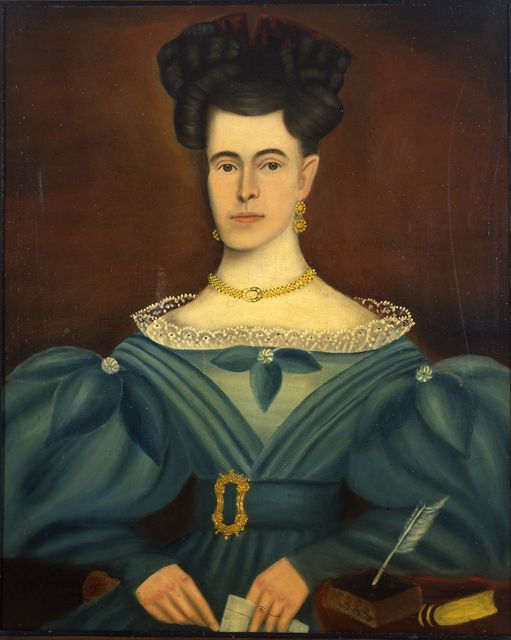
- Smarthistory – Erastus Salisbury Field's Portrait of a Young Woman

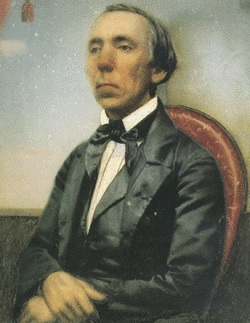
Erastus Salisbury Field, 1840s. Daguerreotype colored by an unidentified photographer.

Erastus Salisbury Field (May 19, 1805 in Leverett, Massachusetts – June 28, 1900 in Sunderland, Massachusetts) was an American folk art painter of portraits, landscapes, and history pictures.

Erastus Field and his twin sister, Salome, were born in Leverett, Massachusetts, on May 19, 1805. By the age of nineteen, Field had displayed sufficient talent in sketching portraits to be admitted as a student at the studio of Samuel F. B. Morse in New York. Morse closed his studio some three months later, and Field returned to Leverett in 1825. His earliest known painting is a portrait of his grandmother, Elizabeth Billings Ashley, painted around 1826.

Field married Phebe Gilmur in Ware, Massachusetts, in 1831. They had one daughter, born in 1832. Field made a good living as a limner or itinerant portrait painter in the 1830s, traveling in western Massachusetts and the Connecticut Valley. He was known for his ability to capture "a good likeness" in a single sitting. In the 1840s, the family settled in Greenwich Village in New York City, where Field exhibited a few paintings and is thought to have taken up the new art of photography. He learned from David Acheson Woodward to use the latter's 1857 solar camera to make enlargements from collodion negatives of portraits onto photo-sensitized canvas which he would over-paint in oils.

He remained in New York for about seven years before relocating to Sunderland, Massachusetts to manage his ailing father's farm. From about 1847 Field embarked on a new phase of his artistic career, creating landscapes and history paintings, as photography began to supplant painting as the preferred medium for portraiture.

Following the death of his wife in 1859, Field and his daughter moved to the settlement of Plumtrees in Sunderland, where he built a studio and continued to paint biblical scenes and Romantic landscapes. From the end of the Civil War he painted mostly historical and patriotic works. His best-known work, the Historical Monument of the American Republic, is a fantastical architectural image of key aspects of American history, inspired by plans for the Centennial Exposition to be held in 1876. Field began work on the large canvas in 1867 and was still adding to it as late as 1888.

Field died at Plumtrees, Sunderland, on June 28, 1900.

All together, over 300 surviving works are attributed to Field.

== Works ==
=== Portraits ===
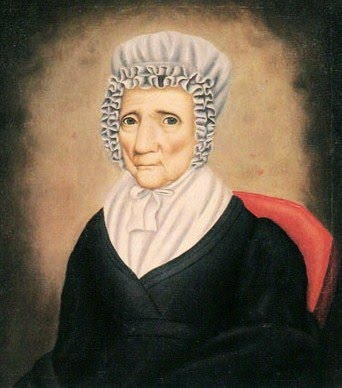
Elizabeth Billings Ashley, ca. 1826

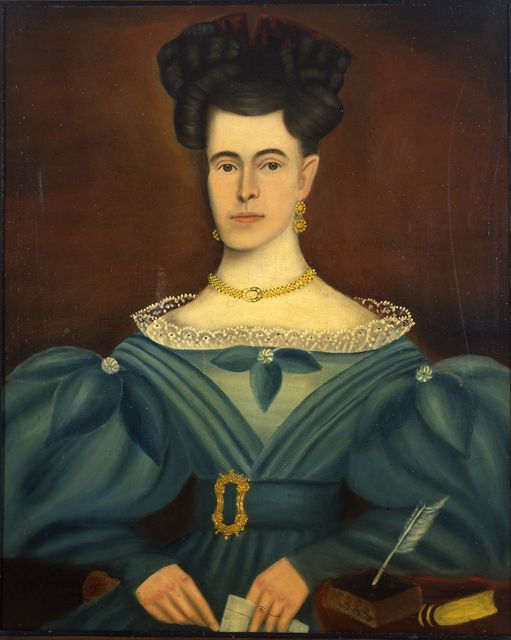
Portrait of a Young Woman, ca. 1830

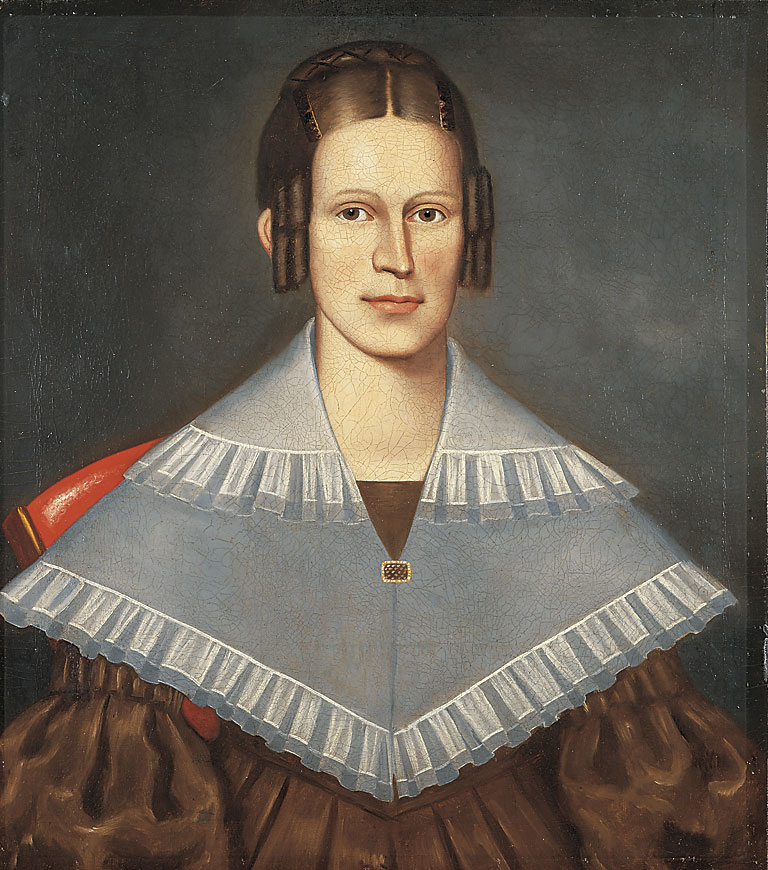
Portrait of Thankful Field (the artist's sister-in-law), 1835

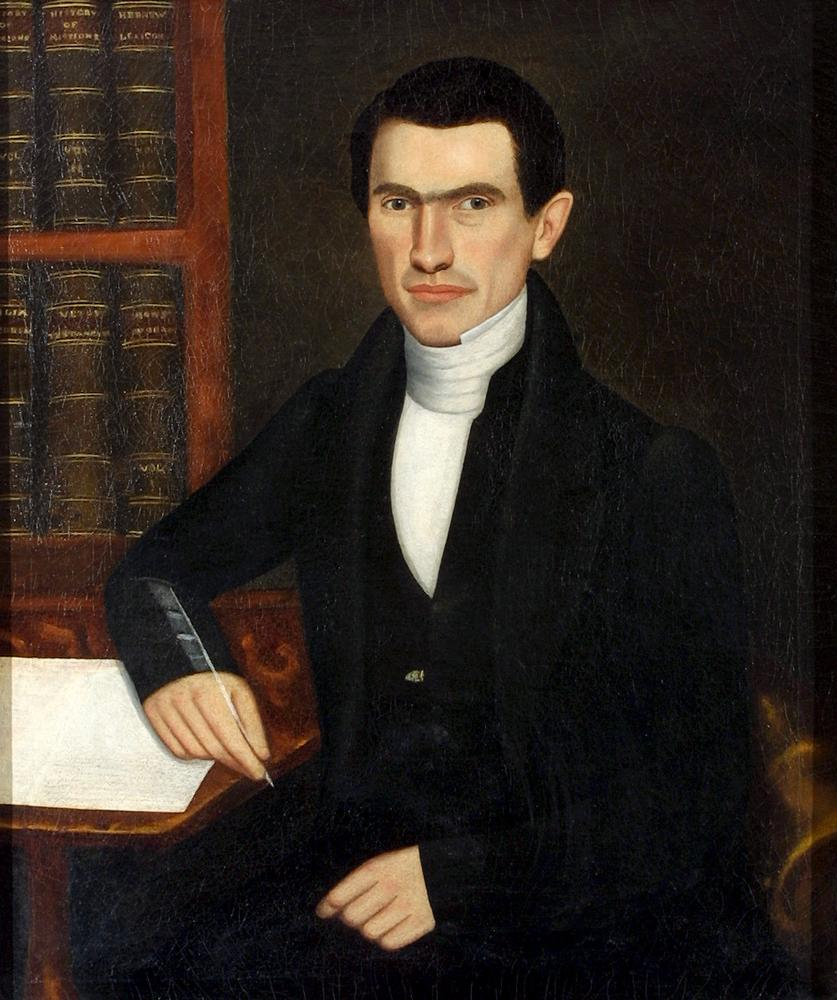
Josiah Goddard, 1838

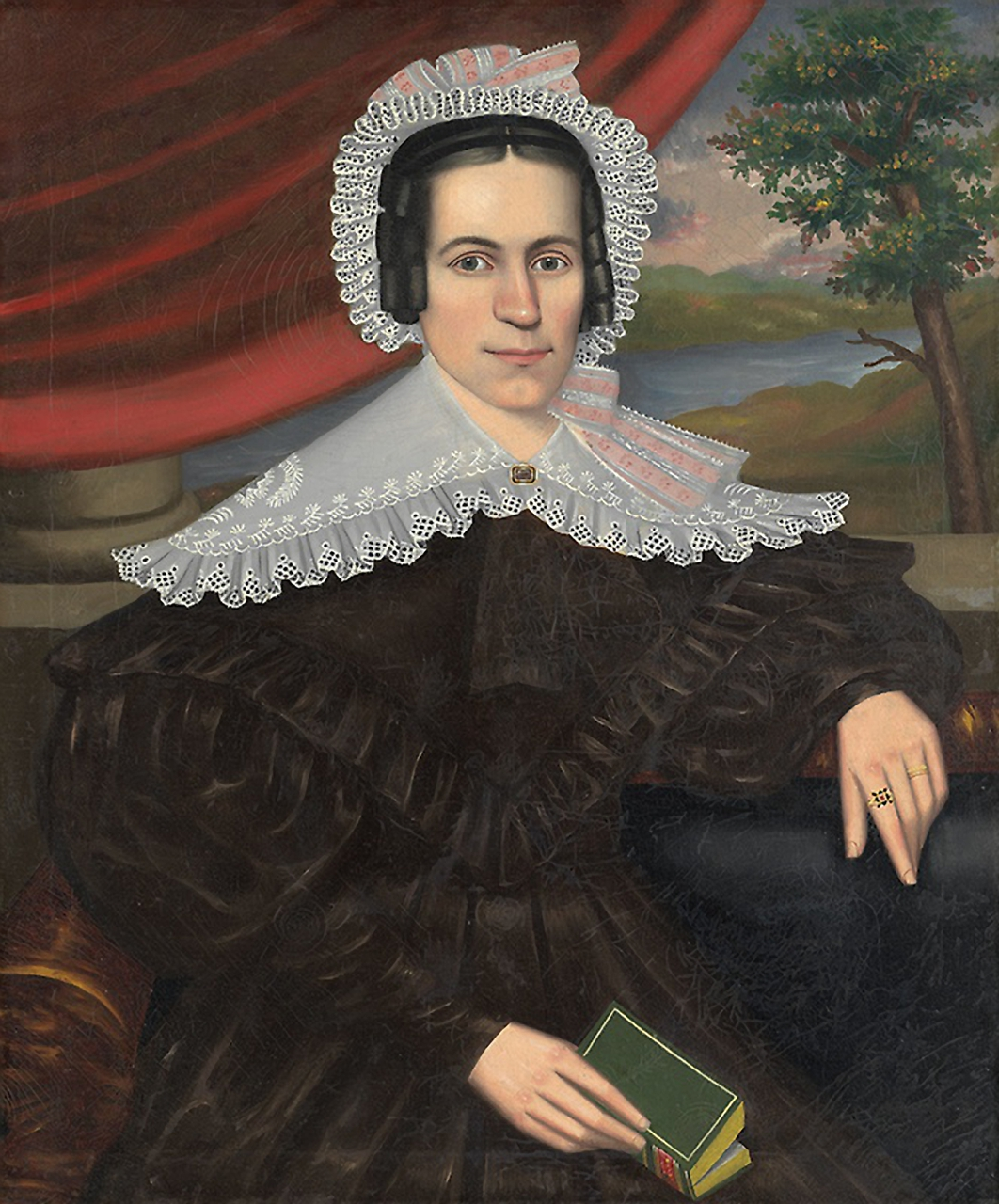
Woman with a Green Book (Louisa Gallond Cook?), ca. 1838

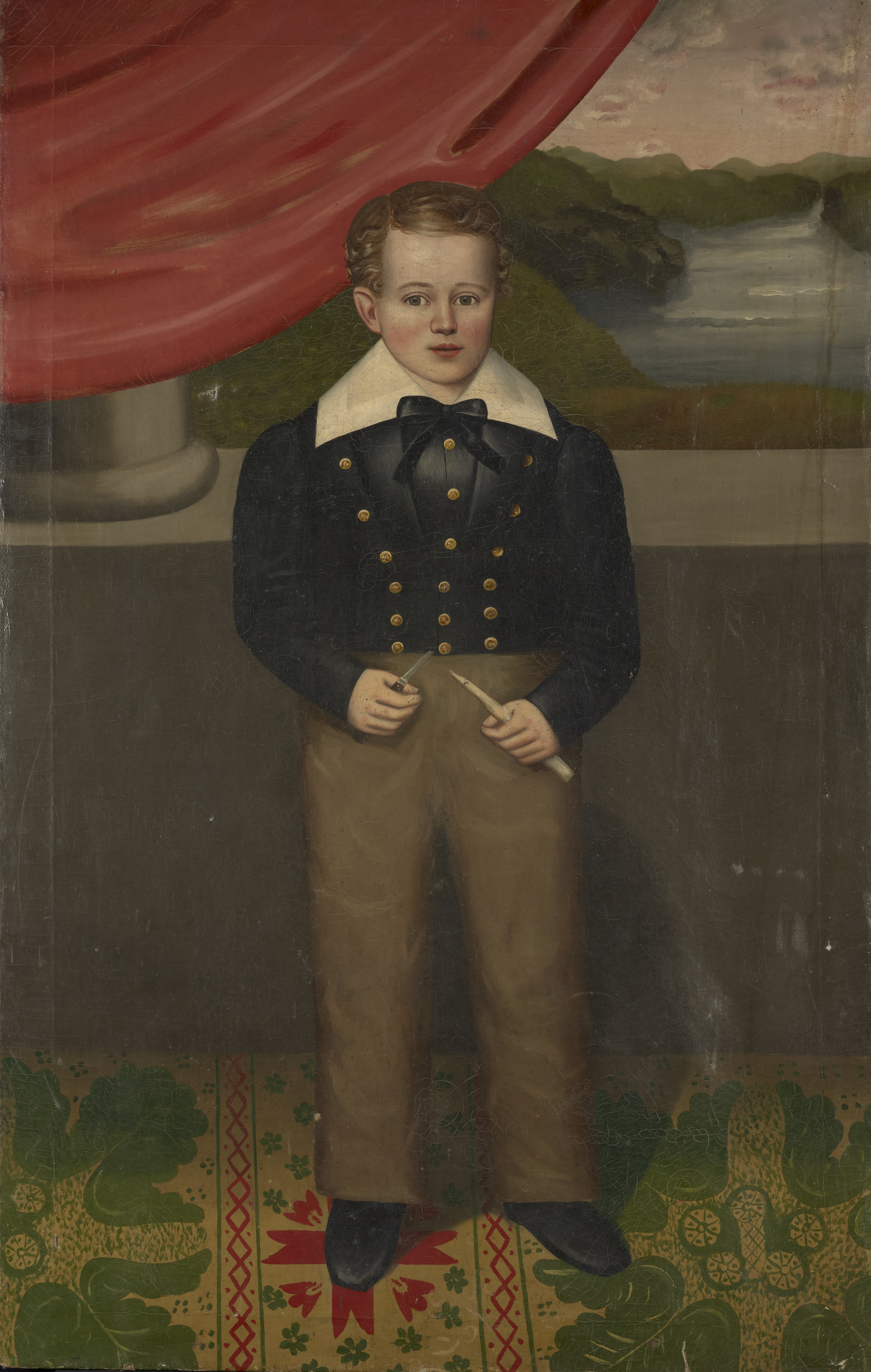
Josiah B. Woods Jr., ca. 1838, Princeton University Art Museum

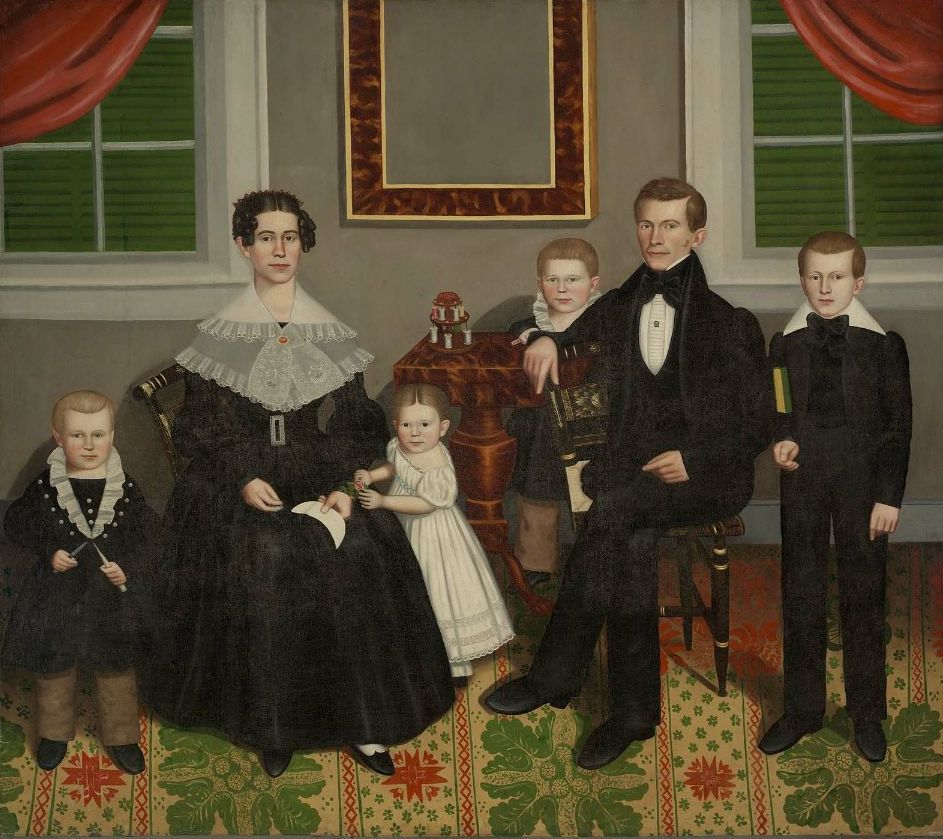
Joseph Moore and His Family, ca. 1839

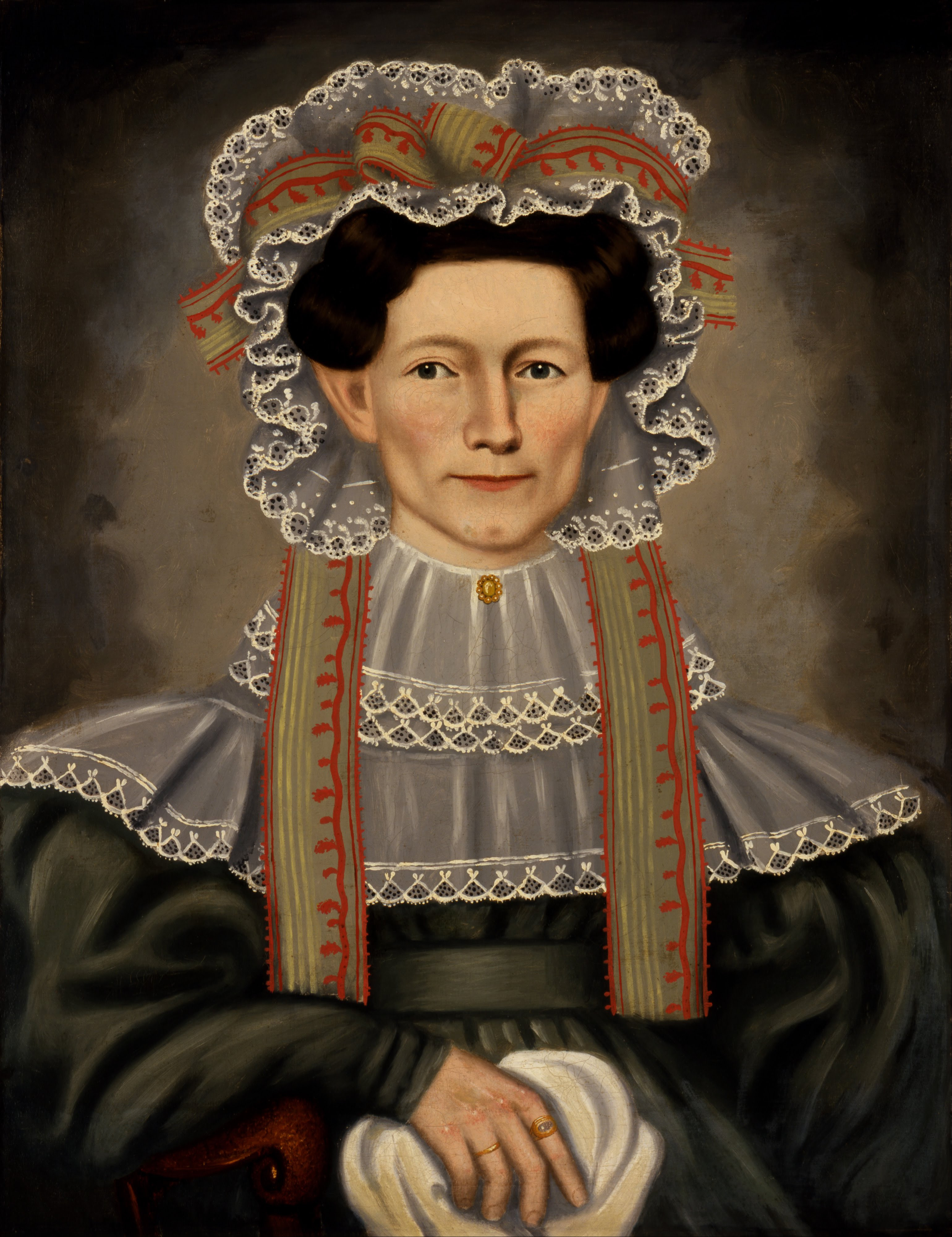
Lady of Squire Williams House ca. 1829

=== Later works ===
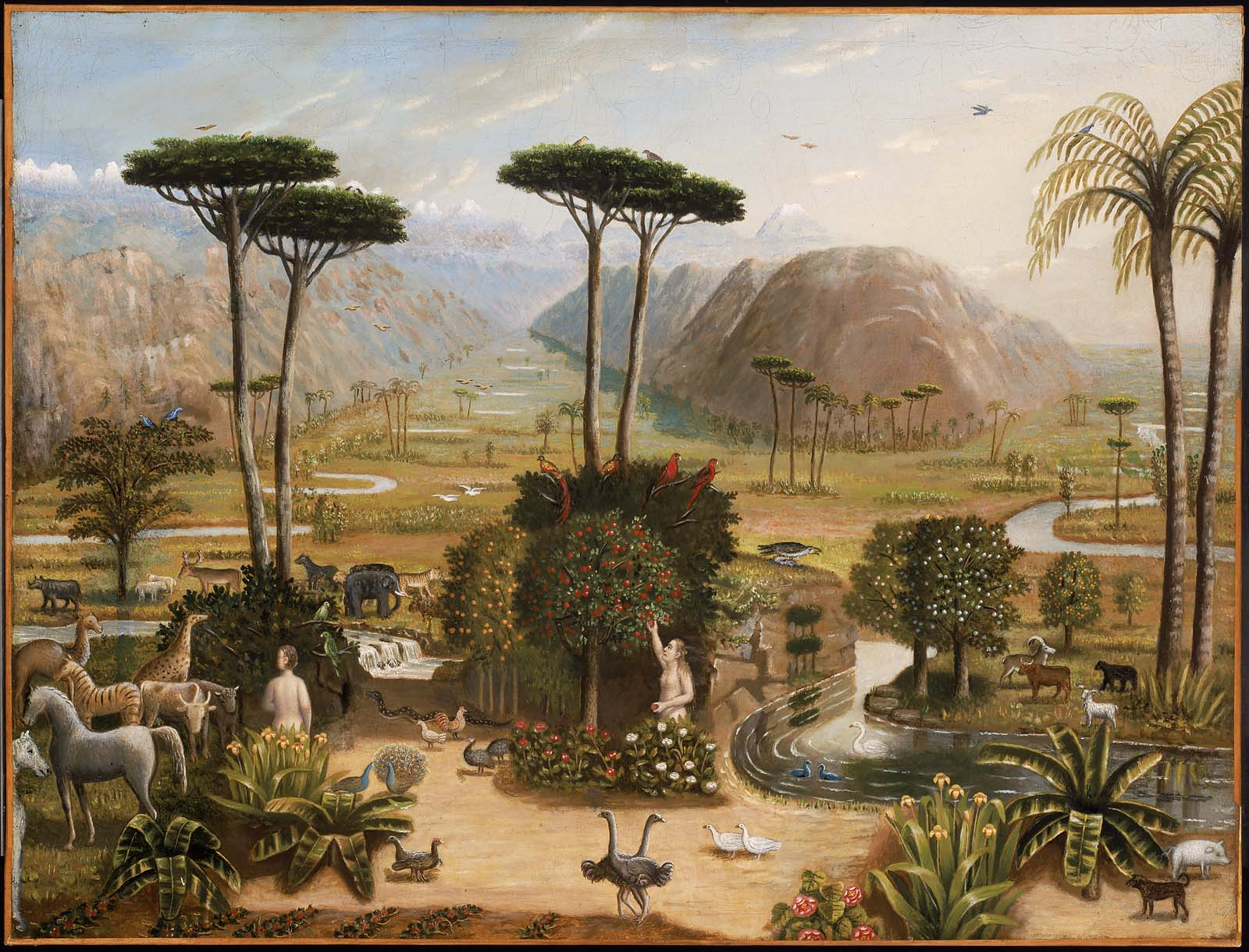
The Garden of Eden, ca. 1860

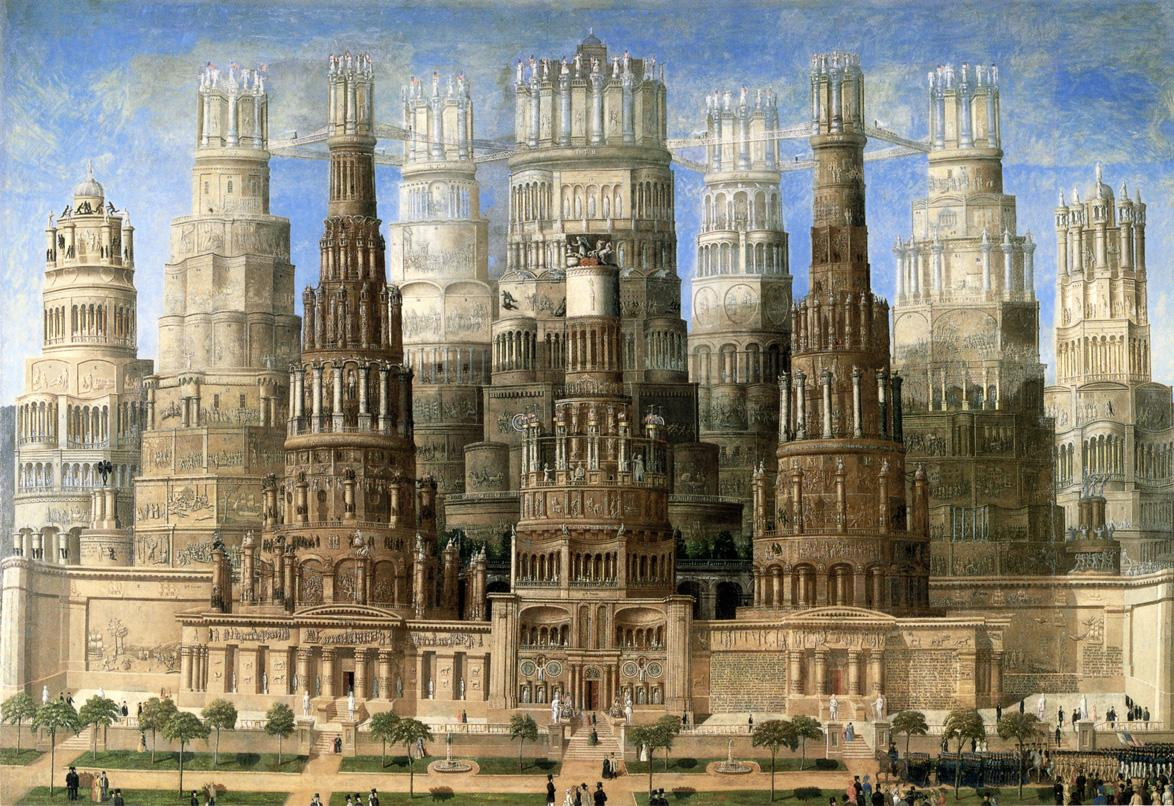
Historical Monument of the American Republic, 1867–1888

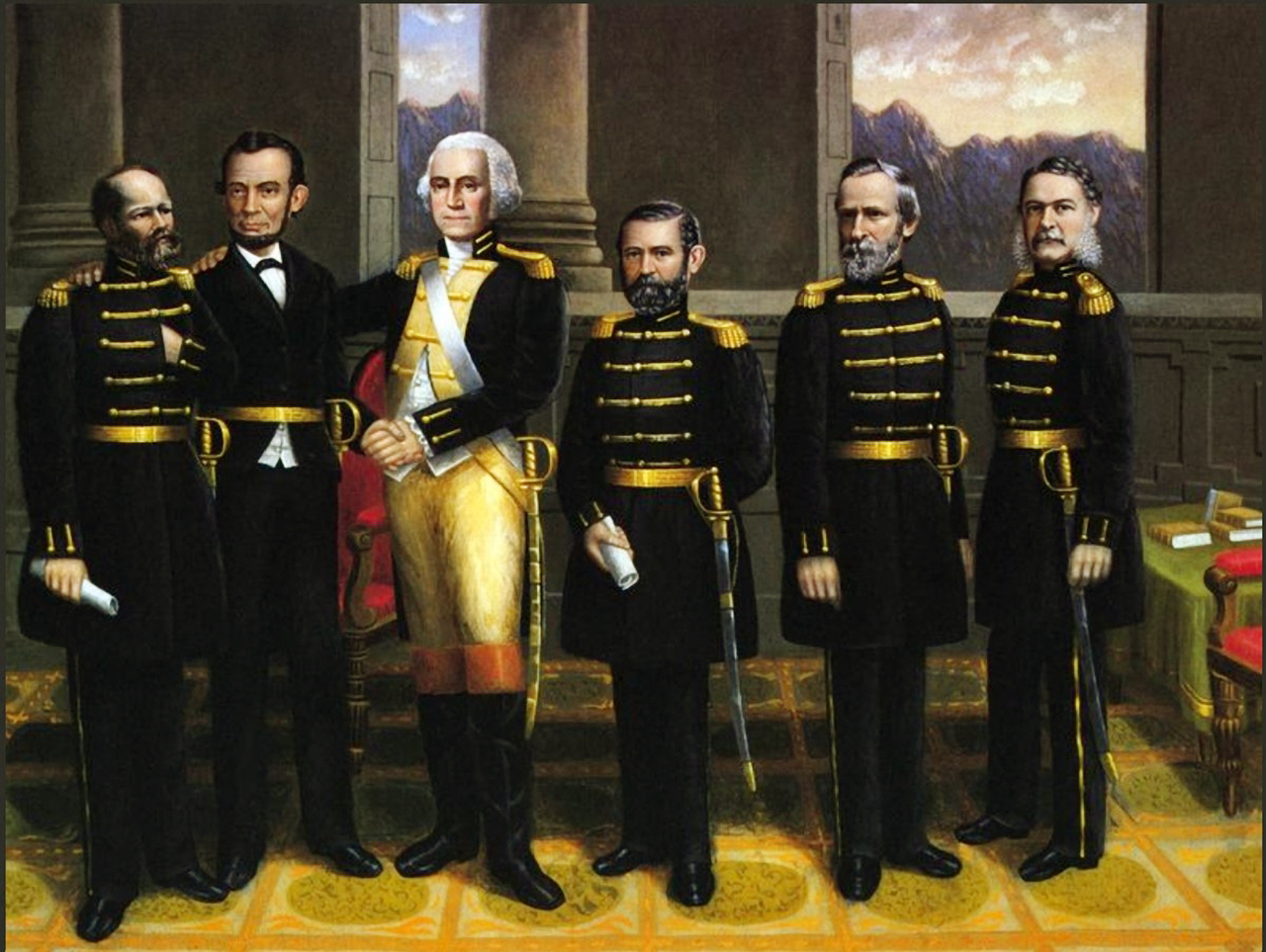
Lincoln with Washington and his Generals, 1881
