= Mayflower Cemetery =

Historic cemetery in Duxbury, Plymouth County, Massachusetts

Coordinates: 42°02′00″N 70°41′37″W

Mayflower Cemetery is a town-owned cemetery in Duxbury, in Plymouth County, Massachusetts. The first grave was of Stephen Russell in 1787 and the first engraved stone was of Ichabod Sampson in 1788. The Duxbury Crematory, also owned by the town, is located on the cemetery grounds. The cemetery is also known as the "Old Cemetery at Unitarian Church Duxbury."

== Notable burials ==
- Richard W. Day (1916–1978) – principal of Phillips Exeter Academy
- Mark Goddard (1936-2023) - actor
- Rufus Hathaway (d. 1822) – physician and painter
- George Partridge (1740–1828) – delegate to the Continental Congress, U.S. Representative
- Cid Ricketts Sumner (1890–1970) – novelist
- Ruth Graves Wakefield (1903–1977) – baker, inventor of the chocolate chip cookie
- Jerry Williams (1923–2003) – American radio host
