= Pine Street Pond =

Lake of the United States of America

- Location within Massachusetts
- Location: Duxbury, Massachusetts
- Coordinates: 42°01′24″N 70°45′22″W
- Primary outflows: unnamed brook
- Basin countries: United States
- Surface area: 17 acres (6.9 ha)

Pine Street Pond is a 17-acre (69,000 m^{2}) pond in Duxbury, Massachusetts. The pond is located southeast of Lower Chandler Pond and northeast of Reeds Millpond. The water quality is impaired due to non-native aquatic plants in the pond. The pond is hydrologically associated with a cranberry bog operation located to the west of the pond. An unnamed brook heading west through the cranberry bog and ultimately leading to Pine Brook is the outflow of the pond.
