= West Chandler Pond =

Lake of the United States of America

- Location within Massachusetts
- Location: Pembroke, Massachusetts
- Coordinates: 42°02′26″N 70°46′39″W
- Primary outflows: unnamed stream
- Basin countries: United States
- Surface area: 12 acres (4.9 ha)

West Chandler Pond is a 12-acre (49,000 m^{2}) pond in Pembroke, Massachusetts. The pond is located west of Upper Chandler Pond and northwest of Pembroke's easternmost Town Forest. The pond is hydrologically associated with a cranberry bog located to the southeast. An unnamed stream that runs through the cranberry bog and ultimately leads to Pine Brook, a tributary of the Jones River, is the outflow of the pond.
