= Upper Chandler Pond =

Lake of the United States of America

- Location within Massachusetts
- Location: Duxbury and Pembroke, Massachusetts
- Coordinates: 42°02′38″N 70°46′04″W
- Primary outflows: Pine Brook
- Basin countries: United States
- Surface area: 10 acres (4.0 ha)

Upper Chandler Pond is a 10-acre (40,000 m^{2}) pond in Duxbury and Pembroke, Massachusetts, USA. It is located north of Lower Chandler Pond and east of West Chandler Pond. The pond is the headwaters to Pine Brook, a tributary of the Jones River. It is hydrologically associated with two nearby cranberry bogs. The water quality is impaired due to non-native aquatic plants and non-native fish in the pond.
