= Reeds Millpond =

Pond in Kingston, Massachusetts

- Location within Massachusetts
- Location: Kingston, Massachusetts
- Coordinates: 42°00′57″N 70°46′14″W
- Primary inflows: Pine Brook
- Primary outflows: Pine Brook
- Basin countries: United States
- Surface area: 10 acres (4.0 ha)

Reeds Millpond is a 10-acre (40,000 m^{2}) pond in Kingston, Massachusetts. The pond is located on Route 27 northwest of the intersection with Winter Street and Reed Street, north of Pembroke Street South Pond, south of Lower Chandler Pond and southwest of Pine Street Pond. Pine Brook, a tributary of the Jones River, flows through the pond. The water quality is impaired due to non-native aquatic plants and non-native fish in the pond.
