= Pembroke Street South Pond =

Lake of the United States of America

- Location within Massachusetts
- Location: Kingston, Massachusetts
- Coordinates: 42°00′40″N 70°46′21″W
- Primary inflows: Pine Brook
- Primary outflows: Pine Brook
- Basin countries: United States
- Surface area: 16 acres (6.5 ha)

Pembroke Street South Pond is a 16-acre (65,000 m^{2}) pond in Kingston, Massachusetts. The pond is located on Route 27 northwest of the intersection with Winter Street and Reed Street, south of Reeds Millpond. Pine Brook, a tributary of the Jones River, flows through the pond. The water quality is impaired due to non-native aquatic plants and non-native fish in the pond.
