= Lower Chandler Pond =

Lake of the United States of America

- Location within Massachusetts
- Location: Duxbury and Pembroke, Massachusetts
- Coordinates: 42°01′52″N 70°45′43″W
- Primary inflows: Pine Brook
- Primary outflows: Pine Brook
- Basin countries: United States
- Surface area: 30 acres (12 ha)

Lower Chandler Pond is a 30-acre (120,000 m^{2}) pond in Duxbury and Pembroke, Massachusetts. The pond is located north of Reeds Millpond and south of Upper Chandler Pond. Pine Brook, a tributary of the Jones River, flows through the pond. The water quality has been impaired by non-native aquatic plants and non-native fish in the pond.
