= Union Street Historic District =

There are three Union Street Historic Districts listed on the U.S. National Register of Historic Places:

- Union Street Historic District (Newton, Massachusetts)
- Union Street Historic District (Poughkeepsie, New York)
- Union Street Historic District (Schenectady, New York)

It may also refer to:

- Bradford-Union Street Historic District, in Plymouth, Massachusetts
- North Union Street Historic District, in Concord, North Carolina
- South Union Street Historic District (disambiguation), in several locations
- Union Street-Academy Hill Historic District, in Montgomery, New York
- West Union Street Historic District, in Morganton, North Carolina
