= National Register of Historic Places listings in Plymouth County, Massachusetts =

Location of Plymouth County in Massachusetts

This is a list of the National Register of Historic Places listings in Plymouth County, Massachusetts.

This is intended to be a complete list of the properties and districts on the National Register of Historic Places in Plymouth County, Massachusetts, United States. The locations of National Register properties and districts for which the latitude and longitude coordinates are included below, may be seen in a map.

There are 147 properties and districts listed on the National Register in the county, including 6 National Historic Landmarks. There is also one now-delisted property, and one listing that was moved to another county.

Contents: Counties in Massachusetts

Barnstable | Berkshire | Bristol | Dukes | Essex | Franklin | Hampden | Hampshire | Middlesex | Nantucket | Norfolk | Plymouth | Suffolk | Worcester

This National Park Service list is complete through NPS recent listings posted July 10, 2026.

== Current listings ==
	Name on the Register	Image	Date listed	Location	City or town	Description
1	Frederic C. Adams Public Library	Frederic C. Adams Public Library	June 6, 2001 (#01000625)	33 Summer St. 41°59′45″N 70°43′48″W	Kingston	
2	John and Priscilla Alden Family Sites	John and Priscilla Alden Family Sites	December 14, 1978 (#78000476)	105 Alden St. 42°02′42″N 70°41′09″W	Duxbury	
3	Bartlett–Russell–Hedge House	Bartlett–Russell–Hedge House	April 30, 1976 (#76001614)	32 Court St. 41°57′27″N 70°40′02″W	Plymouth	
4	Bethel African Methodist Episcopal Church and Parsonage	Bethel African Methodist Episcopal Church and Parsonage	March 19, 2007 (#07000168)	6 Sever St. 41°57′25″N 70°40′08″W	Plymouth	
5	Bird Island Light	Bird Island Light	September 28, 1987 (#87002030)	Sippican Harbor; 41°40′07″N 70°43′04″W	Marion	
6	Blanchard Plat Historic District	Blanchard Plat Historic District	February 13, 2025 (#100011476)	4-17 Carleton St, 10-79 Ellsworth St, 70 Highland St, 4-18 Montgomery St, 101-138 Newbury St, 3-18 North Arlington St, 195-249 West Elm St; 42°04′57″N 71°01′41″W	Brockton	
7	Boston Harbor Islands Archeological District	Boston Harbor Islands Archeological District	December 21, 1985 (#85003323)	Locations in and around Boston Harbor; 42°19′07″N 70°56′45″W	Hingham, Hull	Extends into Quincy and Weymouth in Norfolk County and Boston and Winthrop in Suffolk County
8	Bradford House	Bradford House	March 15, 2006 (#06000128)	50 Landing Rd. 41°59′17″N 70°43′27″W	Kingston	
9	Captain Daniel Bradford House	Captain Daniel Bradford House	February 20, 1986 (#86000301)	251 Harrison St. 42°02′21″N 70°41′08″W	Duxbury	
10	Capt. Gamaliel Bradford House	Capt. Gamaliel Bradford House	February 17, 1978 (#78001402)	West of Duxbury at 942 Tremont St. 42°02′18″N 70°41′22″W	Duxbury	
11	Capt. Gershom Bradford House	Capt. Gershom Bradford House	February 8, 1978 (#78001403)	West of Duxbury at 931 Tremont St. 42°02′16″N 70°41′21″W	Duxbury	
12	Bradford–Union Street Historic District	Bradford–Union Street Historic District	November 10, 1983 (#83004094)	Bradford, Union, Emerald, Water Cure, and Freedom Sts. 41°57′19″N 70°39′38″W	Plymouth	
13	Bridgewater Iron Works	Bridgewater Iron Works	February 28, 2002 (#01000087)	High Street; 42°00′11″N 70°58′54″W	Bridgewater	
14	Brockton City Hall	Brockton City Hall	March 26, 1976 (#76000296)	45 School St. 42°04′56″N 71°01′07″W	Brockton	
15	Brockton Edison Electric Illuminating Company Power Station	Brockton Edison Electric Illuminating Company Power Station	September 17, 1987 (#87000874)	70 School St. 42°05′00″N 70°59′46″W	Brockton	
16	Brockton VA Hospital Historic District	Brockton VA Hospital Historic District	August 12, 2022 (#100008004)	940 Belmont St. 42°03′49″N 71°03′16″W	Brockton	
17	Bryant–Cushing House	Bryant–Cushing House	March 26, 1976 (#76001613)	768 Main St. 42°09′35″N 70°47′14″W	Norwell	
18	Camp Kiwanee Historic District	Camp Kiwanee Historic District	February 24, 2005 (#05000081)	1 Camp Kiwanee Rd. 42°03′34″N 70°50′50″W	Hanson	
19	Cardinal Cushing Center Historic District	Cardinal Cushing Center Historic District	August 10, 2018 (#100002782)	369 Washington St. 42°07′01″N 70°49′13″W	Hanover	
20	Central Fire Station	Central Fire Station	July 25, 1977 (#77000193)	40 Pleasant St. 42°05′06″N 71°01′17″W	Brockton	
21	Centre and Montello Streets Historic District	Centre and Montello Streets Historic District	June 15, 2015 (#15000352)	43–51, 53–61, 63–77, 91–93 Centre & 95, 124–126 Montello Sts. 42°05′02″N 71°01′03″W	Brockton	
22	Thomas Chubbuck Jr. House	Thomas Chubbuck Jr. House	August 7, 1992 (#92000954)	1191 Main St. 42°10′37″N 70°53′09″W	Hingham	
23	Clifford–Warren House	Clifford–Warren House	April 8, 1980 (#80000666)	East of Plymouth at 3 Clifford Rd. 41°56′20″N 70°37′04″W	Plymouth	
24	Cole's Hill	Cole's Hill	October 15, 1966 (#66000142)	Carver St. 41°57′27″N 70°39′46″W	Plymouth	
25	Commonwealth Shoe and Leather Co.	Commonwealth Shoe and Leather Co.	May 13, 2014 (#14000271)	7 Marble Street; 42°04′50″N 70°55′57″W	Whitman	
26	Conant's Hill Site	Conant's Hill Site	November 25, 1983 (#09000091)	End of Station St., ½ mile south of Main St. 41°45′51″N 70°43′51″W	Wareham	
27	Cove Street Historic District	Cove Street Historic District	May 28, 2019 (#100003964)	22-66 Cove St. & 56 Old Cove Rd. 42°02′59″N 70°40′18″W	Duxbury	
28	Curtis Building	Curtis Building	April 15, 1982 (#82004424)	105–109 Main St. 42°04′59″N 71°01′15″W	Brockton	
29	Cushing Homestead	Cushing Homestead	June 4, 1973 (#73000326)	210 East Street; 42°14′25″N 70°51′45″W	Hingham	
30	Dr. Edgar Everett Dean House	Dr. Edgar Everett Dean House	May 5, 1978 (#78000471)	81 Green St. 42°05′05″N 71°01′22″W	Brockton	
31	District 7 School House	District 7 School House	August 11, 2005 (#05000876)	565 Main St. 42°02′25″N 70°51′46″W	Hanson	
32	Duxbury Pier Light	Duxbury Pier Light	June 4, 2014 (#14000287)	Mouth of Duxbury Bay at Plymouth Bay, 5.1 mi. NNE. of Plymouth Rock; 41°59′15″N 70°38′55″W	Plymouth	
33	East Bridgewater Common Historic District	East Bridgewater Common Historic District	May 12, 1999 (#99000559)	Central and Plymouth Sts, and Morse Ave. 42°01′47″N 70°57′09″W	East Bridgewater	
34	East Rochester Church and Cemetery Historic District	East Rochester Church and Cemetery Historic District	January 9, 2008 (#07001361)	355 County Rd. 41°47′05″N 70°46′39″W	Rochester	
35	Emerson Shoe Company	Emerson Shoe Company	June 1, 2018 (#100002542)	51 Maple St. 42°07′28″N 70°55′15″W	Rockland	
36	D.W. Field Park	D.W. Field Park	November 24, 2000 (#00001341)	Between Pond St., Avon St., and Pleasant St. 42°06′17″N 71°02′47″W	Brockton	Extends into Avon in Norfolk County
37	First Baptist Church of Scituate	First Baptist Church of Scituate	July 27, 2015 (#15000469)	656 & 660 Country Way; 42°12′58″N 70°46′37″W	Scituate	
38	First Parish Church	First Parish Church	July 21, 1978 (#78001404)	Southwest of Duxbury at Tremont and Depot Sts. 42°02′06″N 70°41′33″W	Duxbury	
39	First Parish Church of Plymouth	First Parish Church of Plymouth	December 2, 2014 (#14000973)	19 Town Sq. 41°57′20″N 70°39′54″W	Plymouth	
40	First Trinitarian Congregational Church	First Trinitarian Congregational Church	September 12, 2002 (#02001037)	381 Country Way; 42°12′00″N 70°45′37″W	Scituate	
41	Forest Avenue School	Forest Avenue School	July 15, 1982 (#82004425)	Memorial Drive; 42°04′11″N 71°02′27″W	Brockton	
42	Franklin Block	Franklin Block	February 21, 1989 (#89000042)	1102–1110 Main St. 42°03′49″N 71°00′57″W	Brockton	
43	Goldthwaite Block	Goldthwaite Block	April 15, 1982 (#82004427)	99–103 Main St. 42°05′00″N 71°01′12″W	Brockton	
44	Grand Army of the Republic Hall	Grand Army of the Republic Hall	May 16, 1997 (#97000438)	34 School St. 42°07′36″N 70°54′52″W	Rockland	
45	Hanover Center Historic District	Hanover Center Historic District	May 9, 1996 (#96000476)	Roughly Silver St. from Lantern Ln. to Hanover St. 42°07′06″N 70°50′40″W	Hanover	
46	Harlow Old Fort House	Harlow Old Fort House	December 27, 1974 (#74001762)	119 Sandwich St. 41°57′07″N 70°39′26″W	Plymouth	
47	Sgt. William Harlow Family Homestead	Sgt. William Harlow Family Homestead	April 15, 1982 (#82004434)	8 Winter St. 41°57′06″N 70°39′15″W	Plymouth	
48	Hatch Homestead and Mill Historic District	Hatch Homestead and Mill Historic District	September 11, 2009 (#09000698)	385 Union St. 42°07′21″N 70°46′12″W	Marshfield	
49	Hatch-Clift House		July 16, 2026 (#100012790)	687 Union Street; 42°07′57″N 70°46′03″W	Marshfield	
50	Hillside	Hillside	September 18, 1975 (#75001626)	230 Summer St. 41°56′54″N 70°40′48″W	Plymouth	
51	Holy Family Church Complex Historic District	Holy Family Church Complex Historic District	November 3, 2025 (#100012359)	18 North Avenue, 403 Union Street, and 408 Union Street; 42°08′01″N 70°55′01″W	Rockland	
52	Howard Block	Howard Block	April 15, 1982 (#82004969)	93–97 Main St. 42°05′01″N 71°01′11″W	Brockton	
53	Howard Home for Aged Men	Howard Home for Aged Men	December 20, 2016 (#16000871)	940 Belmont St. 42°03′56″N 71°03′11″W	Brockton	Building 60 of the Brockton VA complex
54	Jabez Howland House	Jabez Howland House	October 9, 1974 (#74002032)	33 Sandwich St. 41°57′16″N 70°39′47″W	Plymouth	
55	Hull Shore Drive, Nantasket Avenue, Metropolitan Park System of Greater Boston MPS	Hull Shore Drive, Nantasket Avenue, Metropolitan Park System of Greater Boston MPS	January 21, 2004 (#03001470)	Hull Shore Dr., Nantasket Ave. 42°16′20″N 70°51′39″W	Hull	
56	Island Grove Park National Register District	Island Grove Park National Register District	March 6, 2002 (#02000127)	Park Ave. 42°06′46″N 70°51′40″W	Abington	
57	Capt. Benjamin James House	Capt. Benjamin James House	November 29, 1983 (#83004095)	301 Driftway; 42°10′37″N 70°44′35″W	Scituate	
58	King Caesar House	King Caesar House	March 29, 1978 (#78000477)	King Caesar Rd. 42°02′43″N 70°39′52″W	Duxbury	
59	Gardner J. Kingman House	Gardner J. Kingman House	July 25, 1977 (#77000196)	309 Main St. 42°04′45″N 71°01′15″W	Brockton	
60	Kingston Center Historic District	Kingston Center Historic District	October 4, 2002 (#02001085)	Main and Green Sts; 41°59′42″N 70°44′00″W	Kingston	
61	Lawson Tower	Lawson Tower	September 28, 1976 (#76001963)	Off First Parish Rd. 42°12′01″N 70°45′21″W	Scituate	
62	Leonard, Shaw & Dean Shoe Factory	Leonard, Shaw & Dean Shoe Factory	August 3, 2018 (#100002733)	151 Peirce St. 41°53′45″N 70°54′44″W	Middleborough	
63	Lincoln Historic District	Lincoln Historic District	January 7, 1991 (#90001728)	Roughly North and South Sts. from West to Water Sts., Main St. south to Garrison Rd., and Lincoln St. and Fearing Rd. north to Miles; 42°14′23″N 70°53′27″W	Hingham	
64	Gen. Benjamin Lincoln House	Gen. Benjamin Lincoln House	November 28, 1972 (#72001303)	181 North St. 42°14′35″N 70°53′35″W	Hingham	
65	Lower Union Street Historic District	Lower Union Street Historic District	April 7, 1989 (#89000219)	Union St. from Water St. to Market St. 42°07′38″N 70°54′57″W	Rockland	
66	Lyman Block	Lyman Block	April 15, 1982 (#82004430)	83–91 Main St. 42°05′01″N 71°01′15″W	Brockton	
67	Rocky Marciano House		August 20, 2025 (#100012153)	168 Dover Street; 42°04′27″N 71°01′37″W	Brockton	
68	Marshfield Hills Historic District	Marshfield Hills Historic District	December 18, 2009 (#09001096)	Bow, Highland, Main, Old Main, Pleasant, and Prospect Sts., Glen; 42°08′45″N 70°44′23″W	Marshfield	
69	Mayflower II (square-rigged sailing ship)	Mayflower II (square-rigged sailing ship)	October 22, 2020 (#100005762)	State Pier, Pilgrim Memorial State Park, 79 Water St. 41°57′36″N 70°39′44″W	Plymouth	
70	William H. McElwain School	William H. McElwain School	January 14, 2013 (#12001170)	250 Main St. 41°59′43″N 70°58′53″W	Bridgewater	
71	Men of Kent Cemetery	Men of Kent Cemetery	June 25, 2013 (#13000442)	Meeting House Lane; 42°11′12″N 70°43′44″W	Scituate	
72	Middleborough Center Historic District	Middleborough Center Historic District	June 15, 2000 (#00000685)	Roughly bounded by Conraill RR, Frank, Pierce, School, North Sts., Nemasket R., and East Grove St. 41°53′32″N 70°54′43″W	Middleborough	
73	Middleborough Waterworks	Middleborough Waterworks	March 2, 1990 (#90000129)	E. Grove St. at the Nemasket River and Wareham St. at Barden Hill Rd. 41°53′11″N 70°53′46″W	Middleborough	
74	Minot's Ledge Light	Minot's Ledge Light	June 15, 1987 (#87001489)	Minot's Ledge; 42°16′04″N 70°45′38″W	Scituate	
75	Muttock Historic and Archeological District	Muttock Historic and Archeological District	May 18, 2000 (#00000504)	Oliver Mills Park; 41°54′26″N 70°54′50″W	Middleborough	Ruins of millworks first established by Peter Oliver.
76	Myles Standish Burial Ground	Myles Standish Burial Ground	May 26, 2015 (#15000261)	Chestnut St. 42°01′30″N 70°41′15″W	Duxbury	
77	Myles Standish Park and Myles Standish House Site	Myles Standish Park and Myles Standish House Site	February 4, 2021 (#100006091)	0 Mayflower Dr. 42°00′27″N 70°40′28″W	Duxbury	
78	National Monument to the Forefathers	National Monument to the Forefathers	August 30, 1974 (#74002033)	Allerton St. 41°57′36″N 70°40′36″W	Plymouth	
79	Ned Point Light	Ned Point Light	June 15, 1987 (#87001488)	Ned Point Rd. 41°38′53″N 70°46′16″W	Mattapoisett	
80	New England Telephone and Telegraph Engineering Office	New England Telephone and Telegraph Engineering Office	December 3, 2019 (#100004052)	47 Pleasant St. 42°05′08″N 71°01′16″W	Brockton	
81	North Abington Depot	North Abington Depot	May 13, 1976 (#76001612)	Railroad St. 42°07′45″N 70°56′32″W	Abington	
82	North Downtown Historic District	North Downtown Historic District	August 19, 2024 (#100010689)	Roughly bounded by Main and North Main Streets between Linden Street to the north, Legion Parkway to the south, extending west to Warren Avenue between Spring Street to the north and Legion Parkway to the south 42°05′05″N 71°01′19″W	Brockton	
83	North Rochester Congregational Church	North Rochester Congregational Church	March 21, 2008 (#07001400)	289 North Ave. 41°46′57″N 70°53′39″W	Rochester	
84	Norwell Village Area Historic District	Norwell Village Area Historic District	June 2, 1982 (#82004432)	MA 123; 42°09′41″N 70°47′28″W	Norwell	
85	Old Burial Hill	Old Burial Hill	August 7, 2013 (#13000582)	Church, School & S. Russell Sts. 41°57′22″N 70°39′58″W	Plymouth	
86	Old County Courthouse	Old County Courthouse	February 23, 1972 (#72001297)	Leyden and Market Sts. 41°57′20″N 70°39′53″W	Plymouth	
87	Old Post Office Building	Old Post Office Building	March 8, 1978 (#78000474)	Crescent St. 42°04′51″N 71°01′10″W	Brockton	
88	Old Ship Meetinghouse	Old Ship Meetinghouse	October 15, 1966 (#66000777)	Main St. 42°14′28″N 70°53′16″W	Hingham	
89	Old Shipbuilder's Historic District	Old Shipbuilder's Historic District	August 21, 1986 (#86001899)	Both sides of Washington St. from Powder Point Ave. to north of South Duxbury; 42°02′17″N 70°40′31″W	Duxbury	
90	Old Town Hall Historic District	Old Town Hall Historic District	February 11, 2021 (#100006129)	774, 842, 862, and 878 Tremont St. 42°02′08″N 70°41′30″W	Duxbury	
91	Moses Packard House	Moses Packard House	February 17, 1978 (#78000475)	647 Main St. 42°04′20″N 71°01′11″W	Brockton	
92	Paragon Park Carousel	Paragon Park Carousel	September 14, 1999 (#99001081)	1 Wharf Ave. 42°16′12″N 70°51′26″W	Hull	
93	Parting Ways Archeological District	Parting Ways Archeological District	March 19, 1979 (#79000367)	Plympton Road; 41°56′44″N 70°44′00″W	Plymouth	
94	Pembroke Friends Meetinghouse	Pembroke Friends Meetinghouse	September 6, 2006 (#06000786)	Washington St. and Schoosett St. 42°06′17″N 70°48′18″W	Pembroke	
95	Phoenix Building	Phoenix Building	April 7, 1989 (#89000220)	315–321 Union St. 42°08′16″N 70°54′59″W	Rockland	
96	Peter Pierce Store	Peter Pierce Store	April 30, 1976 (#76001611)	N. Main and Jackson Sts. 41°53′35″N 70°54′28″W	Middleborough	Now the police station.
97	Pilgrim Hall	Pilgrim Hall	April 11, 1972 (#72001298)	75 Court St. 41°57′32″N 70°40′05″W	Plymouth	
98	Pillsbury Summer House	Pillsbury Summer House	November 27, 2004 (#04001257)	45 Old Cove Rd. 42°03′04″N 70°40′15″W	Duxbury	
99	Pinewoods Camp	Pinewoods Camp	December 16, 2009 (#09001151)	80 Cornish Field Rd. 41°51′17″N 70°36′16″W	Plymouth	
100	Plymouth Antiquarian House	Plymouth Antiquarian House	December 27, 1974 (#74002034)	126 Water St. 41°57′37″N 70°40′04″W	Plymouth	
101	Plymouth Light Station	Plymouth Light Station	March 8, 1977 (#77000655)	Southeast of Duxbury at Gurnet Point; 42°00′12″N 70°36′04″W	Plymouth	
102	Plymouth Post Office Building	Plymouth Post Office Building	October 23, 1986 (#86002926)	5 Main St. 41°57′21″N 70°39′50″W	Plymouth	
103	Plymouth Rock	Plymouth Rock	July 1, 1970 (#70000680)	Water St. 41°57′29″N 70°39′45″W	Plymouth	
104	Plymouth Village Historic District	Plymouth Village Historic District	June 2, 1982 (#82004435)	Roughly bounded by Water, Main, and Brewster Sts. 41°57′26″N 70°39′49″W	Plymouth	
105	Plympton Village Historic District	Plympton Village Historic District	March 7, 2007 (#07000120)	Main St., Elm St., Parsonage Rd., Mayflower Rd. 41°57′11″N 70°48′51″W	Plympton	
106	Point Allerton Lifesaving Station	Point Allerton Lifesaving Station	June 11, 1981 (#81000110)	Nantasket Ave. 42°18′20″N 70°54′01″W	Hull	
107	H.R. Reed House	H.R. Reed House	December 2, 2019 (#100004738)	46 Water St. 41°41′58″N 70°45′24″W	Marion	
108	Rockland Almshouse	Rockland Almshouse	April 28, 1983 (#83000600)	198 Spring St. 42°06′52″N 70°54′45″W	Rockland	Now the North River Collaborative.
109	Rockland High School	Rockland High School	March 23, 1989 (#89000217)	394 Union St. 42°08′56″N 70°55′05″W	Rockland	
110	Rockland Memorial Library	Rockland Memorial Library	March 23, 1989 (#89000221)	382 Union St. 42°08′20″N 70°55′04″W	Rockland	
111	Rockland Trust Company	Rockland Trust Company	April 7, 1989 (#89000218)	288 Union St. 42°08′10″N 70°54′59″W	Rockland	
112	Sachem Rock Farm	Sachem Rock Farm	December 11, 2006 (#06001129)	355 Plymouth St. 42°01′06″N 70°57′06″W	East Bridgewater	
113	Sampson-White Joiner Shop	Sampson-White Joiner Shop	December 11, 2023 (#100009826)	267 Winter Street; 42°01′19″N 70°44′42″W	Duxbury	
114	School Street-Main Street Historic District		August 20, 2025 (#100012152)	Roughly bounded by Main Street to the west, School Street to the north and east. and East Elm Street to the south 42°05′00″N 71°01′12″W	Brockton	
115	Scituate Light	Scituate Light	June 15, 1987 (#87001490)	Cedar Pt. 42°12′07″N 70°42′55″W	Scituate	
116	William Sever House	William Sever House	March 7, 2019 (#100003469)	2 Linden St. 41°59′33″N 70°43′31″W	Kingston	
117	Skim Milk Bridge and Causeway Historic District		August 25, 2025 (#100012154)	Off Scotland Street over Town River; 41°59′43″N 71°01′32″W	West Bridgewater	
118	Snow Fountain and Clock	Snow Fountain and Clock	July 25, 1977 (#77000197)	N. Main and E. Main Sts. 42°05′45″N 71°01′11″W	Brockton	
119	South Hingham Historic District	South Hingham Historic District	July 24, 1998 (#98000838)	Roughly along Main St. from Cushing St. to Tower Brook Rd. 42°12′40″N 70°53′06″W	Hingham	
120	South Middleborough Historic District	South Middleborough Historic District	June 19, 2009 (#09000438)	Locust, Spruce, and Wareham Sts. 41°49′27″N 70°49′38″W	Middleborough	
121	South Street Historic District	South Street Historic District	October 6, 1983 (#83004096)	Roughly South St. from Main St. to Warren Ave. 42°03′47″N 71°01′11″W	Brockton	
122	Richard Sparrow House	Richard Sparrow House	October 9, 1974 (#74002035)	42 Summer St. 41°57′15″N 70°39′54″W	Plymouth	
123	Alexander Standish House	Alexander Standish House	July 12, 1978 (#78001407)	341 Standish St. 42°00′30″N 70°40′45″W	Duxbury	
124	Stetson House	Stetson House	September 7, 1979 (#79000366)	Hanover St. 42°06′58″N 70°50′39″W	Hanover	
125	Stetson–Ford House	Stetson–Ford House	March 9, 1998 (#98000120)	2 Meadow Farms Way; 42°07′18″N 70°47′05″W	Norwell	
126	The Tack Factory	The Tack Factory	December 3, 1980 (#80000472)	Southwest of Norwell at 49 Tiffany Rd. 42°07′21″N 70°48′33″W	Norwell	Demolished by fire in 1983.
127	Tarkiln School	Tarkiln School	August 26, 2009 (#09000647)	245 Summer Street; 42°02′09″N 70°44′27″W	Duxbury	Misspelled "Tarklin" in the National Register.
128	Telegraph Hill	Telegraph Hill	July 12, 1976 (#76000953)	Farina Road; 42°18′15″N 70°54′16″W	Hull	
129	Third Meetinghouse	Third Meetinghouse	January 2, 1976 (#76000956)	1 Fairhaven Rd. 41°39′43″N 70°49′13″W	Mattapoisett	
130	Thomas–Webster Estate	Thomas–Webster Estate	April 5, 1993 (#93000206)	238 Webster St. 42°04′46″N 70°40′46″W	Marshfield	
131	Tom Thumb House	Tom Thumb House	April 16, 1993 (#93000298)	351 Plymouth St. 41°55′16″N 70°55′08″W	Middleborough	
132	Tobey Homestead	Tobey Homestead	June 5, 1986 (#86001219)	Main St. and Sandwich Rd. 41°45′24″N 70°42′51″W	Wareham	
133	Town Brook Historic and Archeological District	Town Brook Historic and Archeological District	October 12, 1995 (#95001176)	Address restricted 41°57′01″N 70°40′08″W	Plymouth	
134	Town Hall	Town Hall	October 22, 1976 (#76000955)	Bedford St. 41°50′45″N 70°57′02″W	Lakeville	
135	Tremont Nail Factory District	Tremont Nail Factory District	October 22, 1976 (#76001964)	21 Elm St. 41°45′59″N 70°43′20″W	Wareham	
136	US Post Office–Middleborough Main	US Post Office–Middleborough Main	October 19, 1987 (#87001774)	90 Center St. 41°53′33″N 70°54′40″W	Middleborough	
137	WPA Field House and Pump Station	WPA Field House and Pump Station	May 29, 2009 (#09000355)	7-19 Henry Turner Bailey Rd. 42°13′06″N 70°47′16″W	Scituate	
138	Wampanoag Royal Cemetery	Wampanoag Royal Cemetery	November 11, 1975 (#75001625)	Bedford Street; 41°47′43″N 70°54′45″W	Lakeville	
139	Wampanucket Site	Wampanucket Site	June 4, 1973 (#73001596)	near Assawompset Pond	Middleborough	Paleo-Indian site
140	War Memorial Park	War Memorial Park	May 21, 2008 (#08000445)	River St. 42°09′46″N 71°00′31″W	West Bridgewater	
141	C.P. Washburn Grain Mill	C.P. Washburn Grain Mill	April 8, 1980 (#80000667)	Central and Cambridge Sts. 41°53′37″N 70°55′10″W	Middleborough	Demolished.
142	Daniel Webster Law Office and Library	Daniel Webster Law Office and Library	May 30, 1974 (#74002053)	Careswell and Webster Sts. 42°04′18″N 70°40′26″W	Marshfield	
143	Whitman Park	Whitman Park	March 18, 2004 (#04000187)	Park, Maple, Whitman, and Hayden Aves. 42°04′58″N 70°56′04″W	Whitman	
144	Winslow Cemetery	Winslow Cemetery	January 2, 2018 (#100001219)	Winslow Cemetery Rd. 42°05′09″N 70°40′49″W	Marshfield	
145	Isaac Winslow House	Isaac Winslow House	August 15, 2000 (#00000872)	634 Careswell St. 42°04′18″N 70°40′23″W	Marshfield	
146	Woodworth House	Woodworth House	April 9, 1996 (#96000317)	47 Old Oaken Bucket Rd. 42°10′39″N 70°45′23″W	Scituate	
147	Wright Memorial Library	Wright Memorial Library	July 11, 2007 (#07000680)	147 St. George St. 42°02′55″N 70°40′48″W	Duxbury	

== Former listings ==
	Name on the Register	Image	Date listed	Date removed	Location	City or town	Description
1	Bixby Block–Home Bank Building		March 29, 1978 (#80004071)	February 7, 1980	106 Main St.	Brockton	Destroyed by fire January 1980
2	WITCH (catboat)	WITCH (catboat)	June 18, 2008 (#08000533)		35 Lydia Island Rd. 41°44′04″N 70°39′45″W	Wareham	Moved to Osterville, Massachusetts.

== See also ==
- List of National Historic Landmarks in Massachusetts
- National Register of Historic Places listings in Massachusetts
