= John Washburn =

John Washburn could refer to:

- John Washburn (American colonist), 17th-Century emigrant from England to the Plymouth Colony, see C.P. Washburn Grain Mill
- John Hosea Washburn, American chemist and college president.
- John L. Washburn, U.S. government official and United Nations official
