= Tarkiln School =

- U.S. National Register of Historic Places
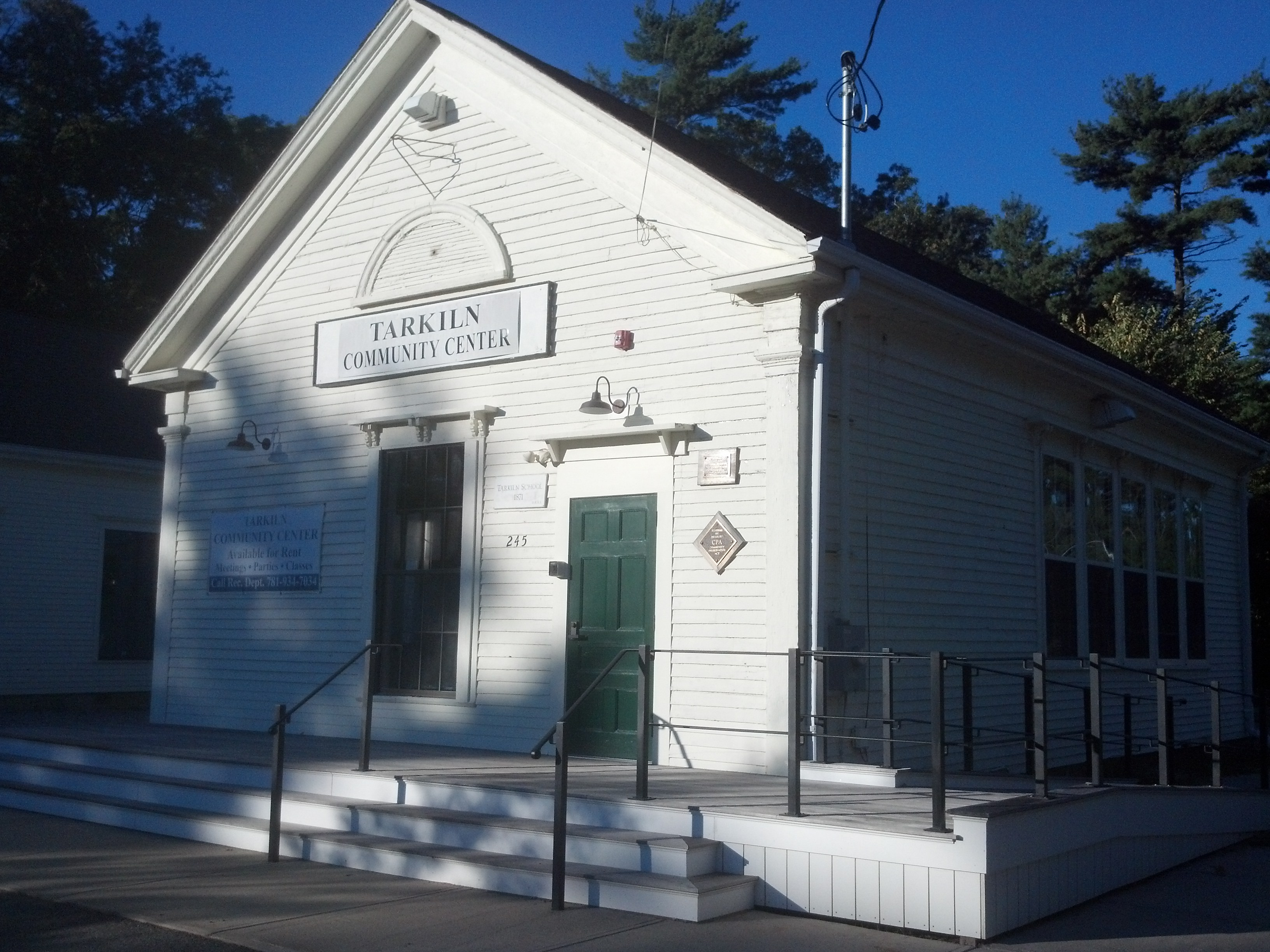
- The south wing

- Location within Massachusetts Location within the United States
- Location: 245 Summer St., Duxbury, Massachusetts
- Coordinates: 42.03599°N 70.74065°W
- Area: 5.7 acres (2.3 ha)
- Built: 1871
- Architect: White, H. Dennison; Parker, L.F.
- Architectural style: Greek Revival, Italianate
- NRHP reference No.: 09000647
- Added to NRHP: August 26, 2009

The Tarkiln School (also misspelled as Tarklin School), is a historic school building at 245 Summer Street in Duxbury, Massachusetts. The oldest portion of this school is a Greek Revival/Italianate one-room schoolhouse that was built in 1871, which is the right (south) wing of the current U-shaped building. A matching building, now the north wing, was erected in 1908, and the two were joined by a hyphen in 1926. A kitchen wing was added to the east in 1951. The school's name is derived from the Tarkiln neighborhood in which it stands, which was derived from the presence of tar kilns in the area. It served the town as a school until 1949, and has been a community center since 1951.

The building was listed on the National Register of Historic Places in 2009 (where it is listed as the "Tarklin" School).

== See also ==
- National Register of Historic Places listings in Plymouth County, Massachusetts
