= Men of Kent Cemetery =

Historic cemetery in Plymouth County, Massachusetts, US

- U.S. National Register of Historic Places
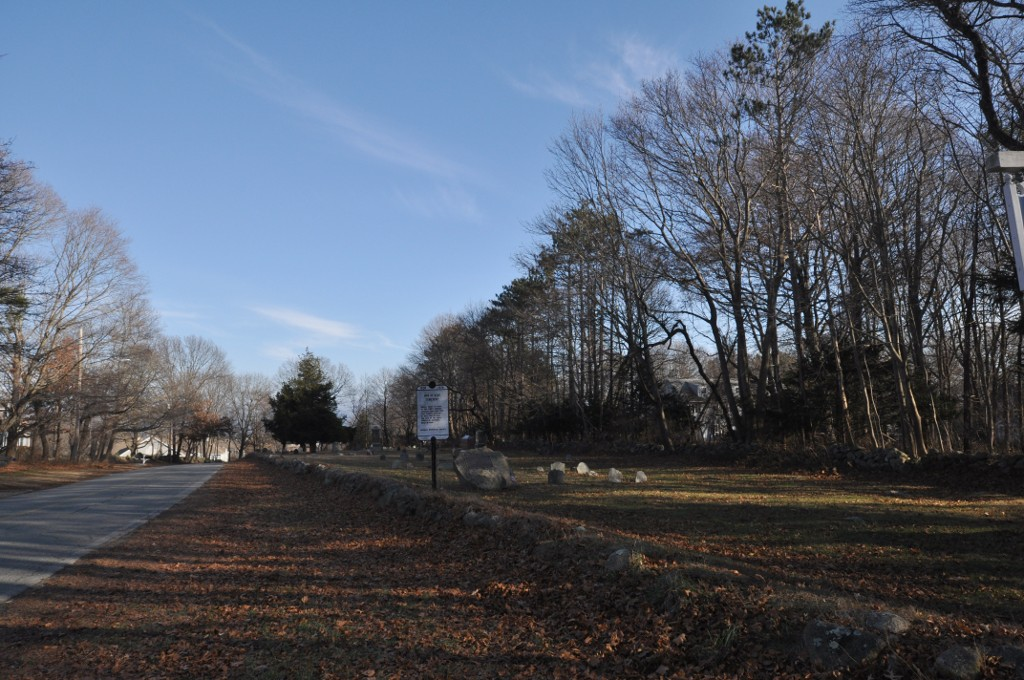

- Location within Massachusetts Location within the United States
- Nearest city: Scituate, Massachusetts
- Coordinates: 42°11′19″N 70°43′44″W
- NRHP reference No.: 13000442
- Added to NRHP: June 25, 2013

The Men of Kent Cemetery is a historic cemetery on Meetinghouse Lane in Scituate, Massachusetts. The cemetery dates from the earliest days of Scituate's settlement, estimated to have been established in 1628. It is the town's oldest cemetery, containing the graves of some of its original settlers. The 0.75 acres (0.30 ha) cemetery is also the site where the town's first meeting house was built in 1636. The cemetery is so named because Scituate was founded by colonists from the English county of Kent.

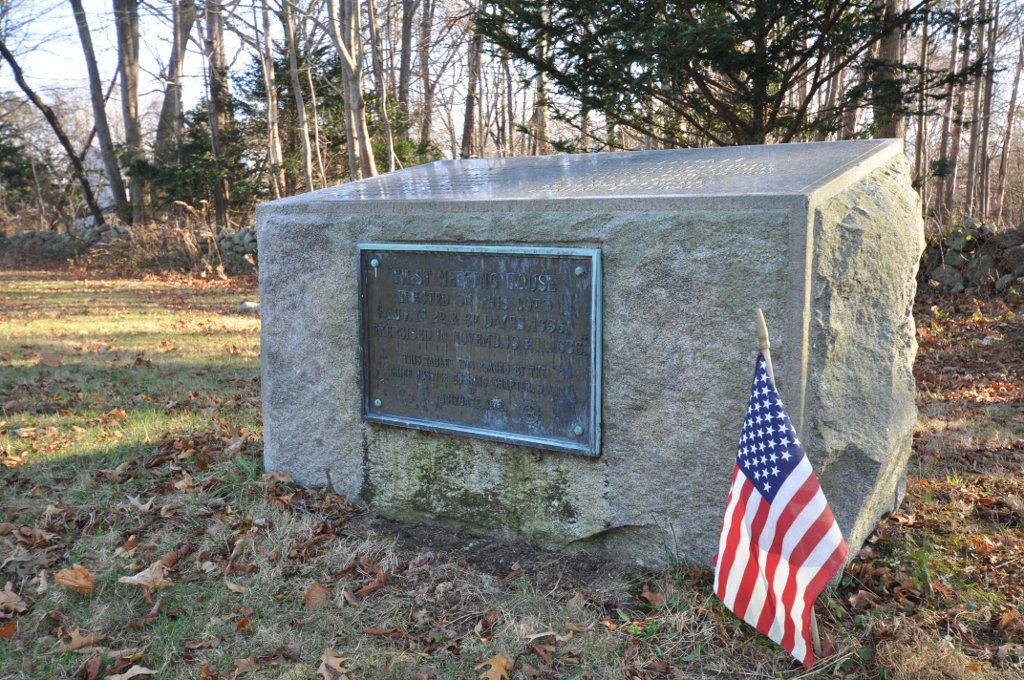
Memorial to Scituate's early ministers

The cemetery was listed on the National Register of Historic Places in 2013.

== See also ==
- National Register of Historic Places listings in Plymouth County, Massachusetts
