= Plympton Village Historic District =

Historic district in Massachusetts, United States

- U.S. National Register of Historic Places
- U.S. Historic district
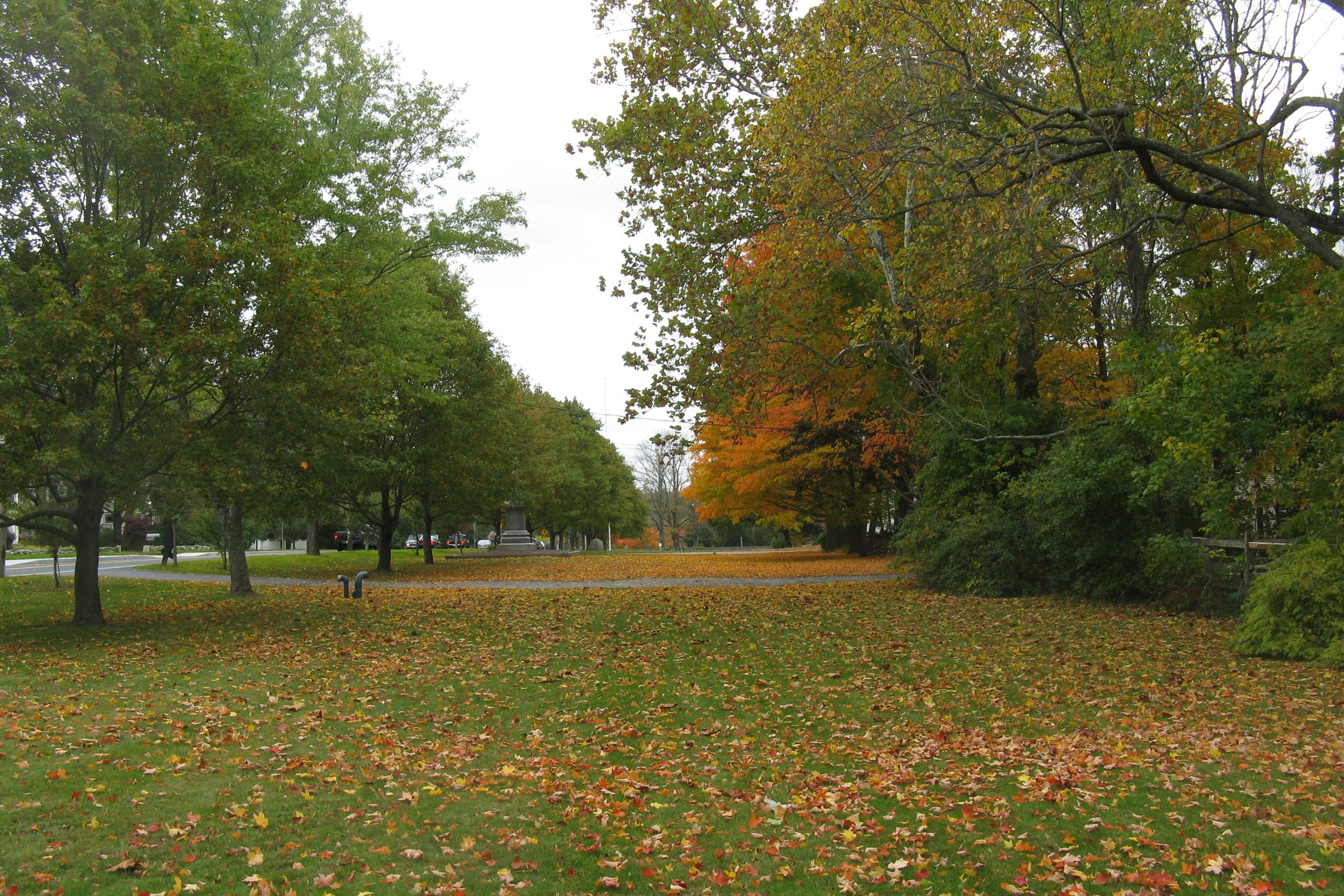
- Plympton Green

- Location within Massachusetts Location within the United States
- Location: Plympton, Massachusetts
- Coordinates: 41°57′12.2″N 70°48′51.4″W
- Area: 60 acres (24 ha)
- Built: 1706
- Architect: Sherman, Zacheus; Peterson, Whittemore
- Architectural style: Georgian, Federal
- NRHP reference No.: 07000120
- Added to NRHP: March 7, 2007

The Plympton Village Historic District encompasses the historic village center of Plympton, Massachusetts. It is a roughly linear district, running along Main Street (Massachusetts Route 58) between Palmer Road and Mayflower Road. There are twenty buildings in the district, most of which are residential. The focal point of the district, however, is the town green, around which the town's main civic buildings are arrayed. The green was laid out in 1702, but the oldest civic building (the First Congregational Church) was built in the 1850s, a period in which many of the houses were also built. The oldest building in the district is the Reverend Ezra Sampson House at 255 Main Street, which was built in the late 18th century.

The district was listed on the National Register of Historic Places in 2007.

== See also ==
- National Register of Historic Places listings in Plymouth County, Massachusetts
