= Franklin Block (Brockton, Massachusetts) =

- U.S. National Register of Historic Places
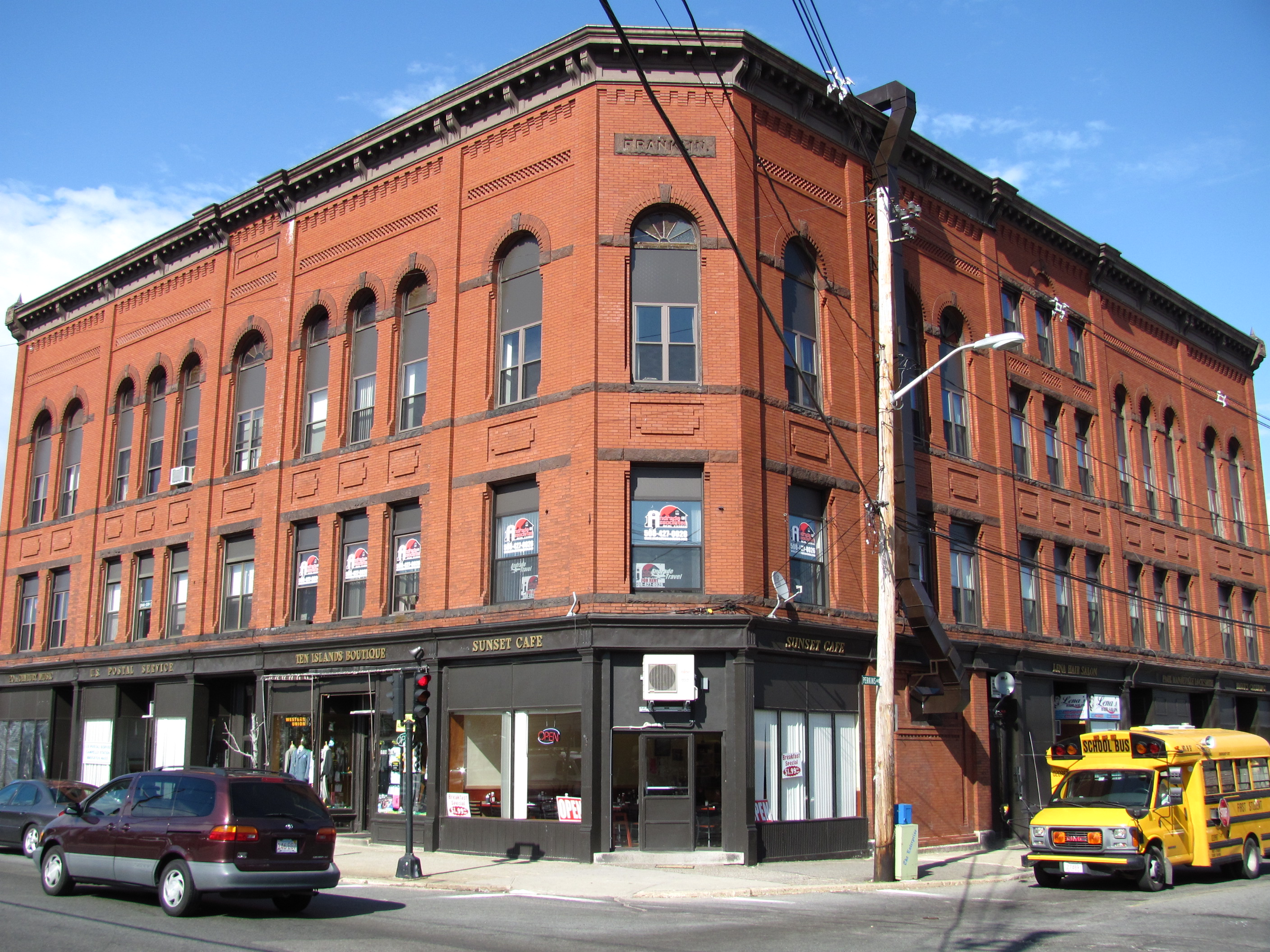
- Franklin Block

- Location within Massachusetts Location within the United States
- Location: 1102–1110 Main Street, Brockton, Massachusetts
- Coordinates: 42°3′49″N 71°0′57″W
- Area: less than one acre
- Built: 1888
- Architectural style: Romanesque Revival
- NRHP reference No.: 89000042
- Added to NRHP: February 21, 1989

The Franklin Block is a historic commercial building in Brockton, Massachusetts. The three-story brick Romanesque Revival-style building was built in 1888. Its construction marked the high point in the economic recovery of the city's Campello neighborhood, which had been devastated by fire in 1853, and is one of two 19th-century buildings in the area. The building was listed on the National Register of Historic Places in 1989.

== Description and history ==
The Franklin Block is set at the northeast corner of Main and Perkins Street in the city's Campello neighborhood, a secondary area of industrial and commercial development south of the city's downtown. The building is a four-story L-shaped brick structure with Romanesque Revival styling, and an angled section at the corner. Its two street-facing elevations have storefronts on the ground floor, defined by plate glass windows and entrances demarcated by fluted pilasters. The upper floor bays are demarcated in groups by tall brick pilasters. The second floor has rectangular sash windows with transoms, with sills set in a sandstone string course. Raised brick panels separate the second and third floors. The third floor windows have round-arch transoms, and are set in openings with sandstone keystones. Its historic uses are as retail space on the ground floor, office space on the second, and a meeting hall on the upper levels, used by lodges, fraternal societies, and community organizations.

The city of Brockton developed economically in the 19th century as a major center of the shoemaking industry. Its development was strung along Main Street, which paralleled the railroad tracks through the city. The Campello section south of the downtown was part of this boom in the mid-19th century, but was devastated by a major fire in 1853. It recovered due in part to the city's continued prosperity, and this building was built in 1888. The only other surviving 19th-century building in the area is the 1871 Kingman Block at 1147 Main Street.

== See also ==
- National Register of Historic Places listings in Plymouth County, Massachusetts
