= Peter Pierce Store =

- U.S. National Register of Historic Places
- U.S. Historic district – Contributing property
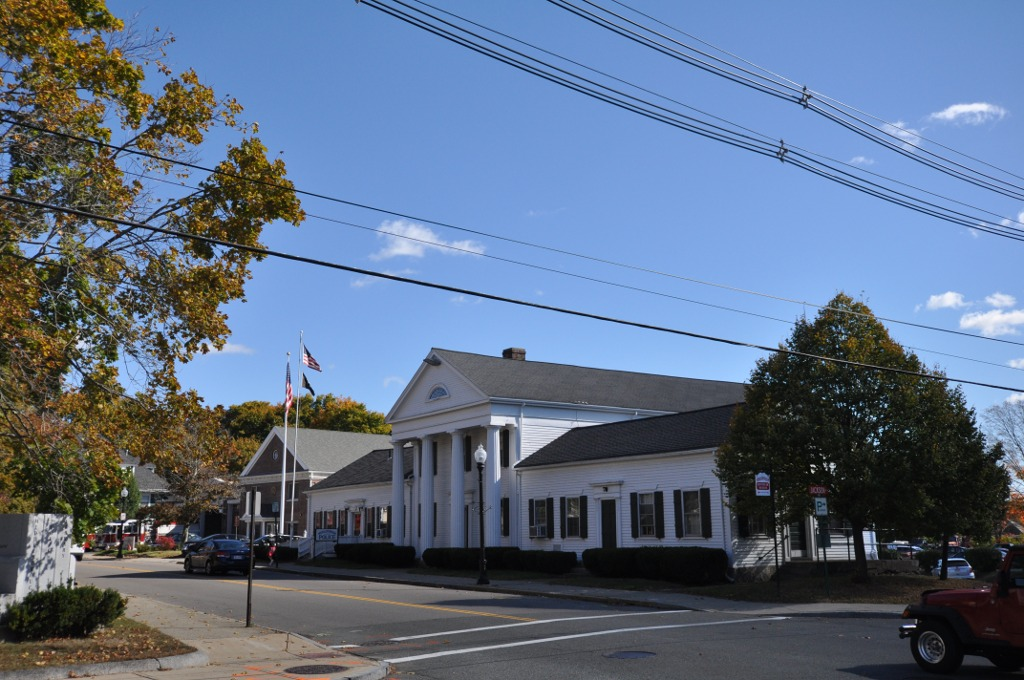

- Location within Massachusetts Location within the United States
- Location: 99 N. Main St., Middleborough, Massachusetts
- Coordinates: 41°53′35″N 70°54′28″W
- Area: less than one acre
- Built: 1825
- Part of: Middleborough Center Historic District (ID00000685)
- NRHP reference No.: 76001611

Significant dates
- Added to NRHP: April 30, 1976
- Designated CP: June 15, 2000

The Peter Pierce Store is a historic commercial building at 99 North Main Street in Middleborough, Massachusetts. The Greek Revival structure was built in 1808 by Colonel Peter Pierce, one of the town's leading businessmen of the mid 19th century. It has been renovated into apartments. The building was listed on the National Register of Historic Places in 1976.

== Description and history ==
The former Peter Pierce Store occupies a prominent location the center of Middleborough, at the northeast corner of North Main and Jackson Streets. It is a T-shaped wood frame structure, with a two-story central section forming the leg of the T, and single-story flanking sections on either side. The central section is fronted by a monumental four-column Greek Revival portico, the columns supporting an entablature and fully pedimented gable with a semi-oval window at the center. The side wings have gable roofs perpendicular to that of the central block, and are each five bays wide with a center entrance framed by pilasters and a corniced entablature.

Peter Pierce (or Peirce, 1788-1861) was for many years one of Middleborough's most prominent businessmen. In addition to a retail store, he operated a cotton mill, a shovel factory, and served as a money lender. He was active in civic affairs, serving for two years in the state legislature. This building was erected in stages between 1825 and 1830 to house all of his diverse retail affairs. The business was operated by his sons until 1901, and then sold out of the family. In 1935 it was purchased by the town and adapted for use as its police headquarters, a function it served until 2018. It is one of the town's most architecturally significant 19th-century buildings.

== See also ==
- National Register of Historic Places listings in Plymouth County, Massachusetts
