= William Sever House =

Historic house in Massachusetts, United States

- U.S. National Register of Historic Places
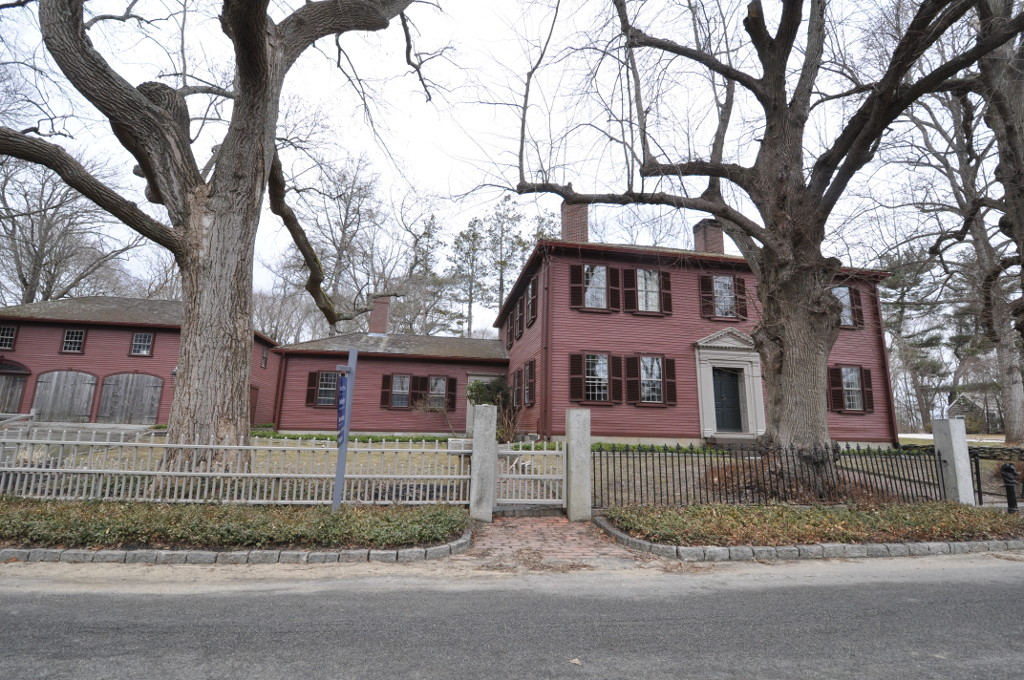

- Location within Massachusetts Location within the United States
- Location: 2 Linden St., Kingston, Massachusetts
- Coordinates: 41°59′33″N 70°43′31″W
- Area: 1.43 acres (0.58 ha)
- Built: 1768
- Architectural style: Georgian; Federal
- NRHP reference No.: 100003469
- Added to NRHP: March 7, 2019

The William Sever House is an historic house at 2 Linden Street in Kingston, Massachusetts. Built in 1768, it is a good local example of Georgian and Federal period architecture. Its builder, William Sever, was a prominent local political figure and businessman, serving in the colonial legislature for many years. The house was listed on the National Register of Historic Places in 1978.

== Description and history ==
The William Sever House stands in the central village of Kingston, on the north side of Linden Street, a short street between Main Street and Landing Road. The house is a wood-frame structure, 2 1/2 stories in height, with a hipped roof and clapboarded exterior. The main facade is five bays wide, with sash windows arranged symmetrically around the main entrance. The entrance is framed by a broad surround with fluted Doric pilasters and a corniced entablature. The property includes a barn and carriage house, each of which date to the late 19th century.

The house was built in 1768 for William Sever, a prominent local merchant who began service as a town representative to the colonial legislature in 1750. The house originally had a gambrel roof, which was raised around 1800 to its present hip configuration. A Federal style balustrade added at that time was removed around 1924. The house remained in the Sever family until the early 20th century.

== See also ==
- National Register of Historic Places listings in Plymouth County, Massachusetts
