= Wampanucket Site =

- U.S. National Register of Historic Places
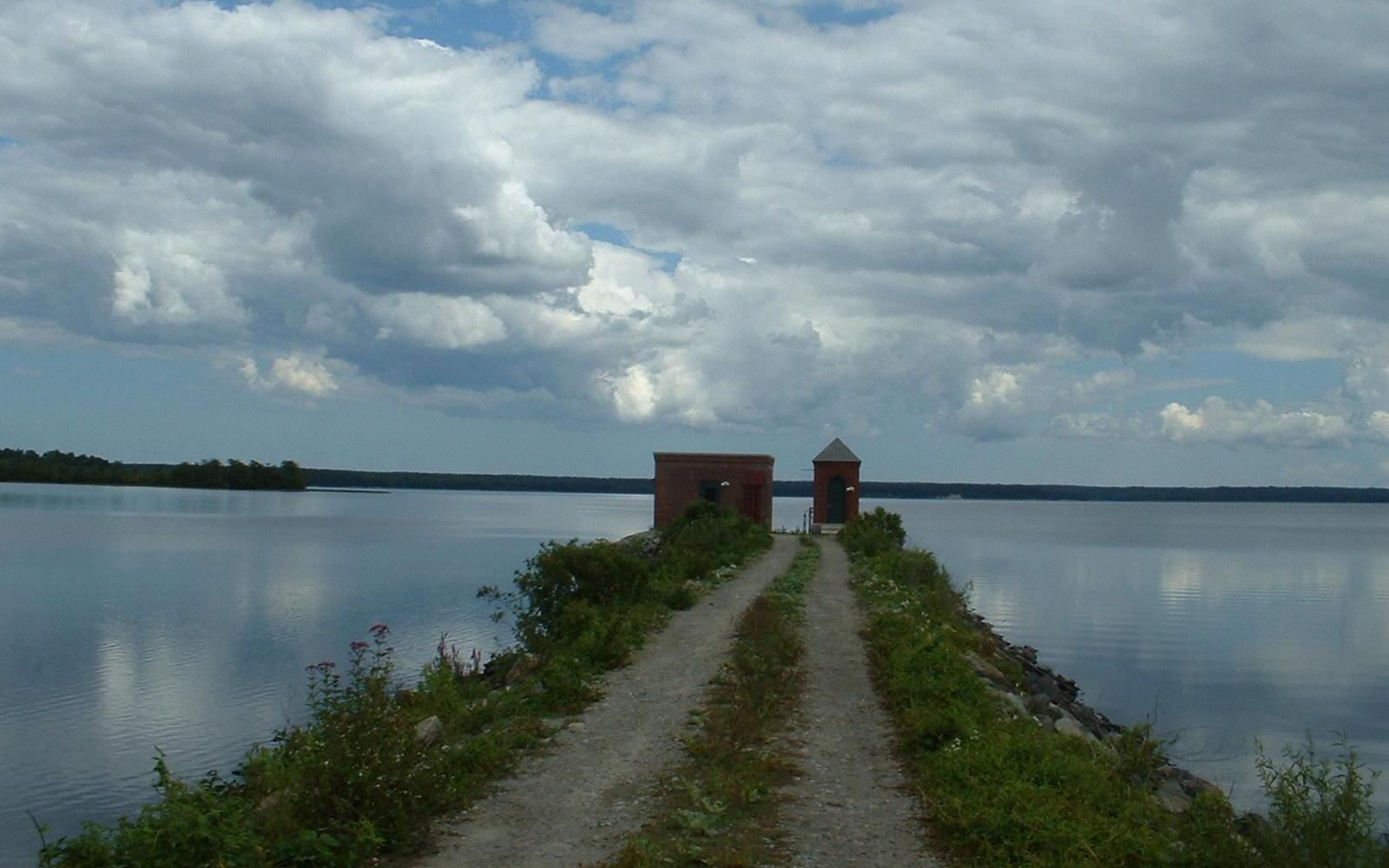
- Assawompsett Pond, in whose area the site is located
- Nearest city: Middleborough, Massachusetts
- NRHP reference No.: 73001596
- Added to NRHP: June 4, 1973

The Wampanucket Site is a pre-historic archaeological site in Middleborough, Massachusetts, United States. Located near Assawompset Pond, it is a major Paleo-Indian site providing evidence of human habitation as far back as 12,000 years ago. Finds at the site include projectile points from both the Early Archaic and Late Woodland Periods. Evidence of human habitation extends across a number of prehistoric periods and into the colonial period, when the area was occupied by a subgroup of the Wampanoag tribe.

The site was listed on the National Register of Historic Places in 1973.

== See also ==
- National Register of Historic Places listings in Plymouth County, Massachusetts
