= Leonard, Shaw & Dean Shoe Factory =

- U.S. National Register of Historic Places
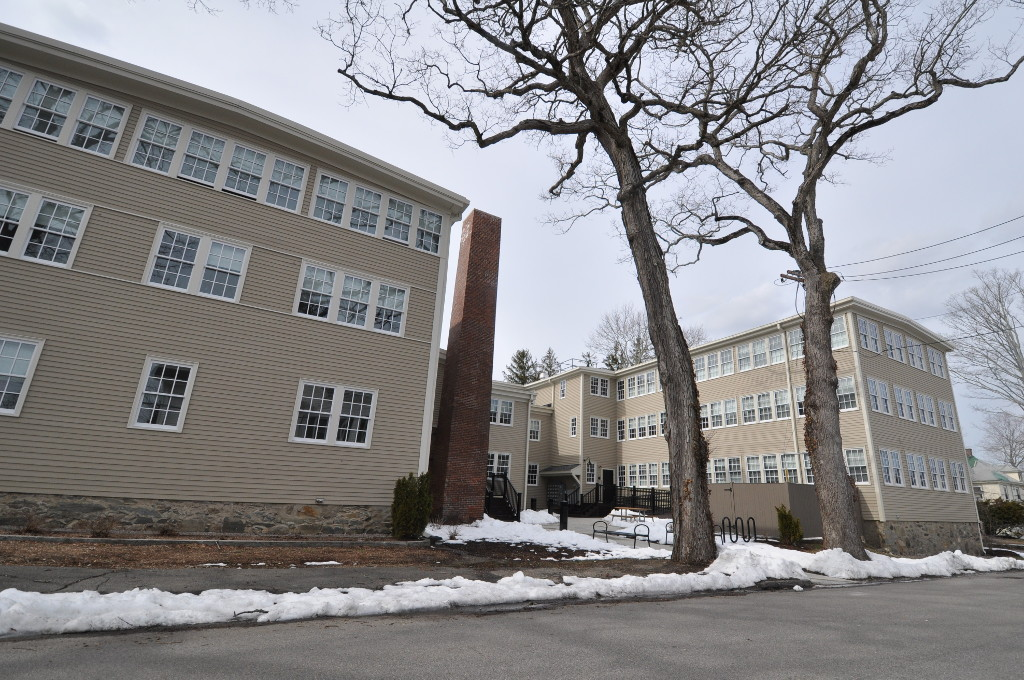

- Location within Massachusetts Location within the United States
- Location: 151 Peirce St., Middleborough, Massachusetts
- Coordinates: 41°53′45″N 70°54′44″W
- Built: 1896
- NRHP reference No.: 100002733
- Added to NRHP: August 3, 2018

The Leonard, Shaw & Dean Shoe Factory is a historic industrial property located at Rice and Peirce Streets in Middleborough, Massachusetts. Built in 1896 and repeatedly enlarged before 1911, it was home to one of the town's major employers. Now converted to residential use, the factory complex was listed on the National Register of Historic Places in 2018.

== Description and history ==
The former Leonard, Shaw & Dean Shoe Factory is located in a mixed industrial-residential area in Middleborough, at the northeast corner of Peirce and Rice Streets. It is a U-shaped complex of industrial buildings, three stories in height. They are mostly of wood frame construction, and are covered either by low-pitched gabled roofs or shed roofs. In the center of the U is a brick boiler house, and there is a brick elevator tower at the western end of the southern leg of the U.

The oldest portion of the complex was built in 1896 by Cornelius Leonard and Samuel Shaw, who had joined forces to begin a shoe manufactory in 1892 which was first located in leased space on Jenks Street. This oldest section paralleled Peirce Street, and the major elements of the U shape were added in 1905 and 1911. The boiler house was added in 1907, and the elevator house sometime after 1925. Leonard and Shaw took on W. Henry Dean as a partner in 1897, and operated here until 1933, when manufacturing was moved to Centre Street after a series of corporate mergers. In the 1950s the building was occupied by Bay State Specialties, and manufacturer of advertising materials.

== See also ==
- National Register of Historic Places listings in Plymouth County, Massachusetts
