= Hillside (Plymouth, Massachusetts) =

Historic house in Massachusetts, United States

- U.S. National Register of Historic Places
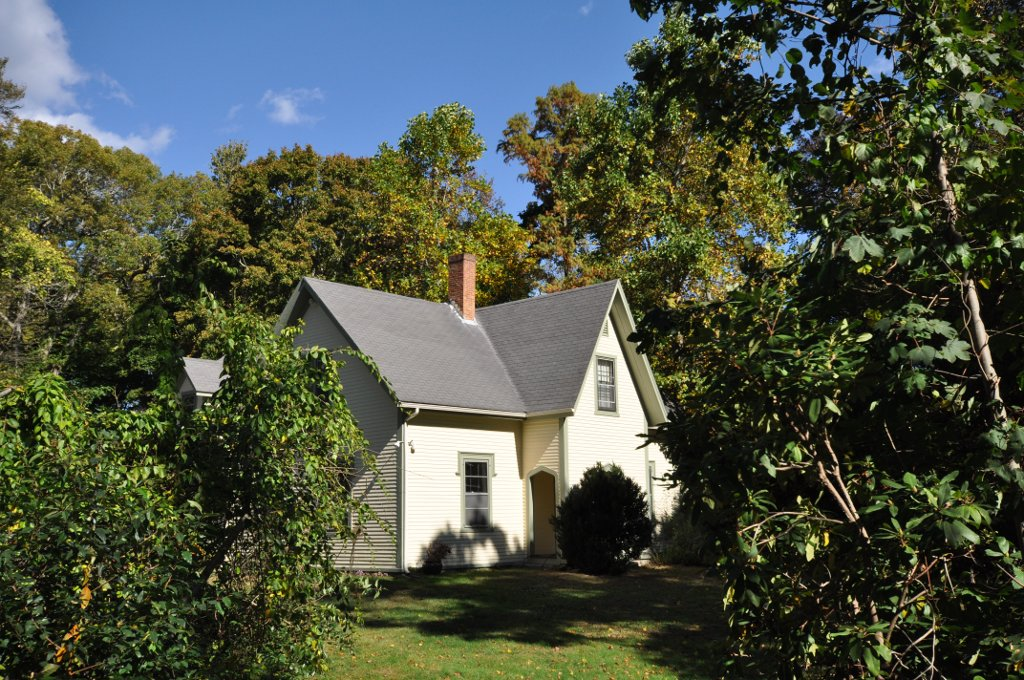

- Location within Massachusetts Location within the United States
- Location: 230 Summer Street, Plymouth, Massachusetts
- Coordinates: 41°56′54″N 70°40′48″W
- Built: 1845
- Architect: Samuel Longfellow
- Architectural style: Gothic Revival
- NRHP reference No.: 75001626
- Added to NRHP: September 18, 1975

Hillside is a historic house located at 230 Summer Street in Plymouth, Massachusetts.

== Description and history ==
The 2 1/2-story wood-frame house was built in 1845, and was designed in the Gothic Revival style. It was the site at which Benjamin Watson established one of the nation's first garden nurseries, the "Old Colony Gardens". Also Ralph Waldo Emerson stayed the night here before marrying Plymouth native Lydia Jackson.

The house was listed on the National Register of Historic Places on September 18, 1975.

== See also ==
- National Register of Historic Places listings in Plymouth County, Massachusetts
