= WPA Field House and Pump Station =

- WPA Field House
- U.S. National Register of Historic Places
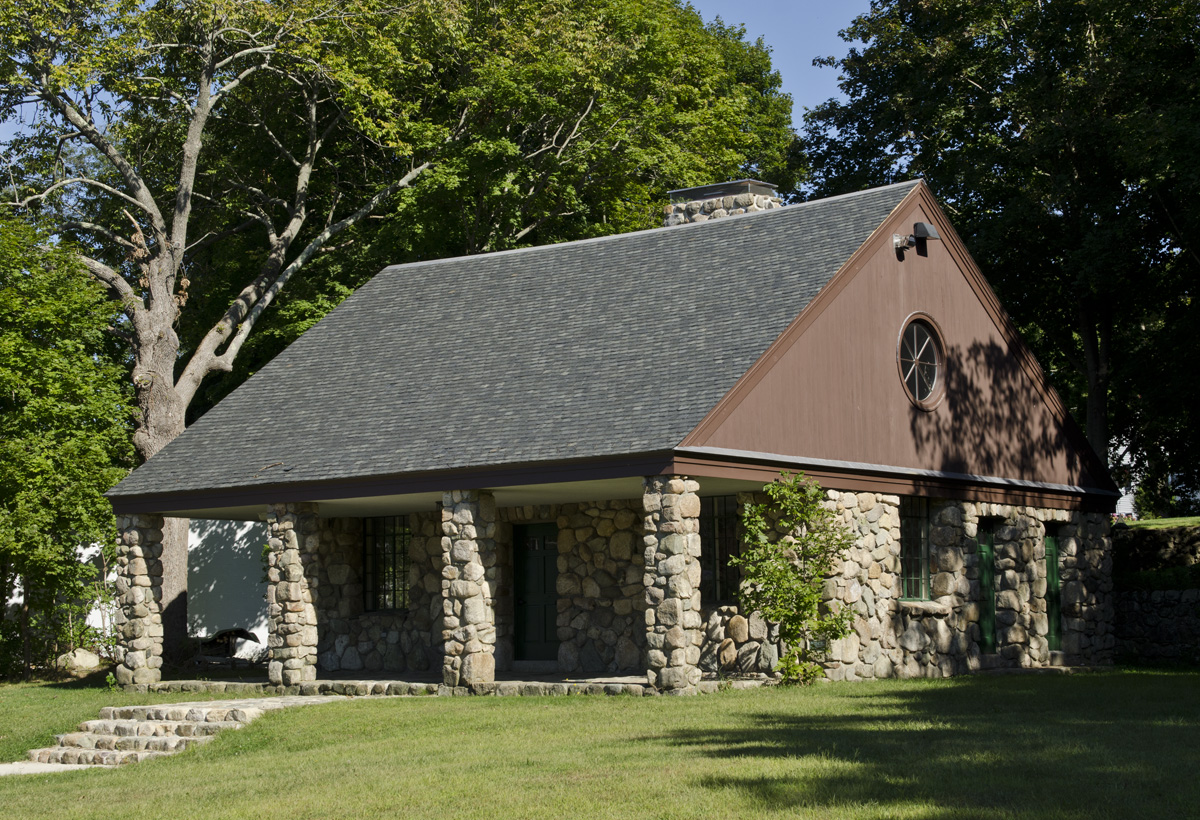

- Location within Massachusetts Location within the United States
- Location: 7-19 Henry Turner Bailey Rd., Scituate, Massachusetts
- Coordinates: 42°13′6″N 70°47′14″W
- Area: 5 acres (2.0 ha)
- Built: 1938
- Architect: Milano, M. Joseph
- Architectural style: Bungalow/craftsman, Classical Revival
- NRHP reference No.: 09000355
- Added to NRHP: May 29, 2009

The WPA Field House and Pump Station is a historic water works facility on Henry Bailey Turner Road in Scituate, Massachusetts. The field house at Bound Brook Park was built in 1938–9 with funding from the Works Progress Administration, and is a rare historical recreational building in the town. The building is 1.5 stories, 38 feet (12 m) deep and 41 feet (12 m) wide, and built of stone with a slate side-gable roof. Its front facade is sheltered by a porch that lies under the roof and is supported by stone piers; there is a center entry that is flanked on each side by a window. The building was used for storage (in the basement) and for community group meetings, and was shuttered in 1981. In 2009 it was undergoing restoration.

The building and its grounds were listed on the National Register of Historic Places in 2009.

== See also ==
- National Register of Historic Places listings in Plymouth County, Massachusetts
