= South Middleborough Historic District =

Historic district in Massachusetts, United States

- U.S. National Register of Historic Places
- U.S. Historic district
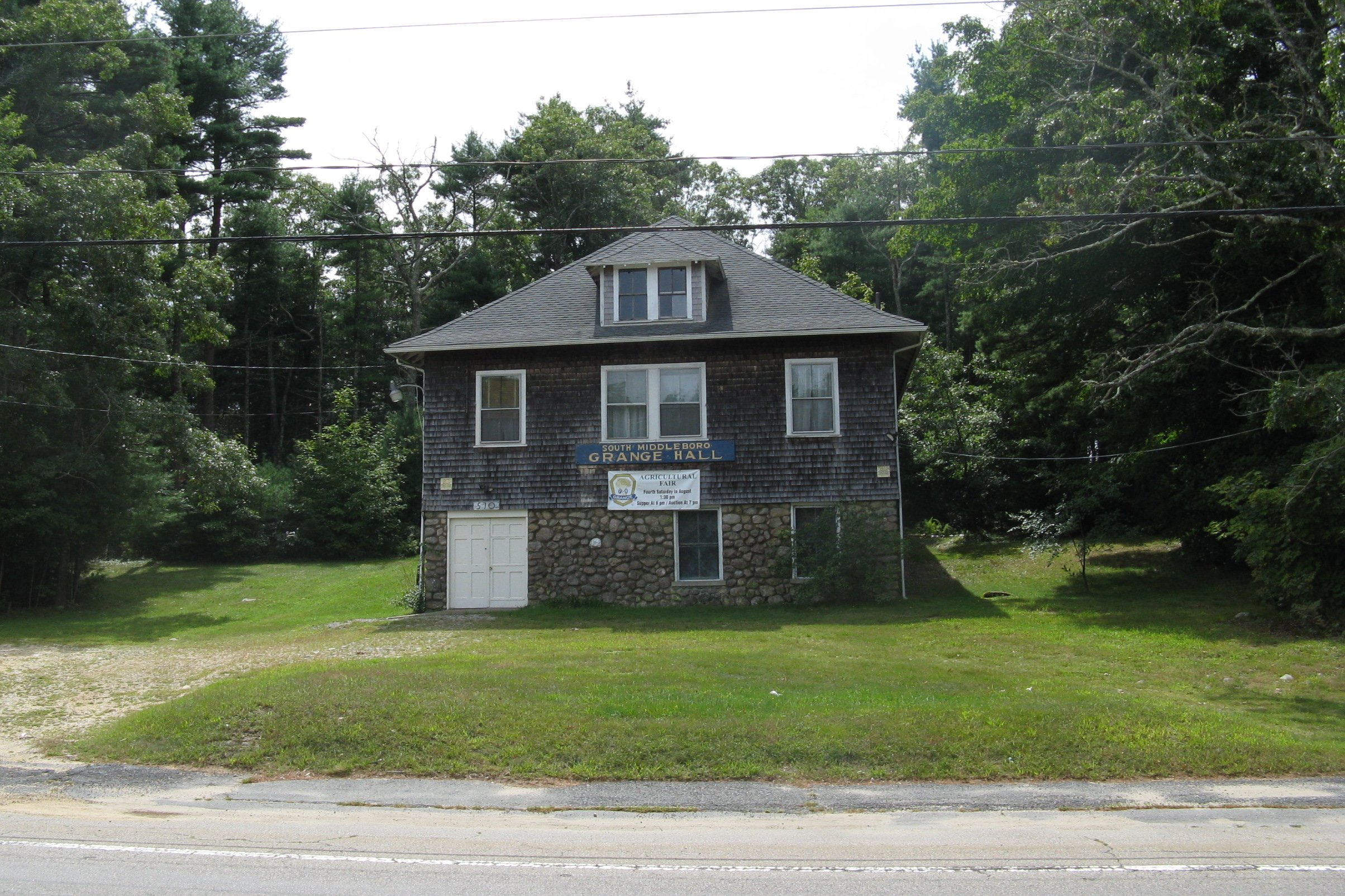
- The South Middleborough Grange Hall

- Location within Massachusetts Location within the United States
- Location: Locust, Spruce, and Wareham Sts., Middleborough, Massachusetts
- Coordinates: 41.82366°N 70.82896°W
- Area: 88 acres (36 ha)
- Built: 1768
- Architectural style: Colonial, Greek Revival, 51
- NRHP reference No.: 09000438
- Added to NRHP: June 19, 2009

The South Middleborough Historic District encompasses the historic village center of South Middleborough, Massachusetts. The village is located about 6.5 miles (10.5 km) south of the town center, at the junction of Wareham and Locust Streets. Wareham Street (designated Massachusetts Route 28), was for many years the primary route to Cape Cod, until the construction in 1966 of Massachusetts Route 24, a divided highway that bypasses the village. Partly because of the highway, the village center has not been significantly altered since that time.

The district includes 88 acres (36 ha), with 75 contributing resources. Most of buildings in the district were constructed between the late 18th century and about 1930. It began to develop as a local center of civic and commercial activity in the second half of the 18th century, when a church (no longer extant, now the site of the 1841 Greek Revival Methodist church) was built and the cemetery was laid out. By the early 19th century a cluster of houses had risen in the area. The arrival of the railroad in 1848 spurred additional growth, including the construction of stores such as the c. 1890 South Middleborough Store at 32 Spruce Street, and the rise of lumbering as an industry. In the 1920s the rise of the automobile led to increased traffic on the Wareham road, and the village grew to serve the business of passing travelers. This traffic was considerably reduced by the construction of Route 24, and the village suffered economically.

== See also ==
- National Register of Historic Places listings in Plymouth County, Massachusetts
