= East Rochester Church and Cemetery Historic District =

Historic area in Plymouth County, Massachusetts

- U.S. National Register of Historic Places
- U.S. Historic district
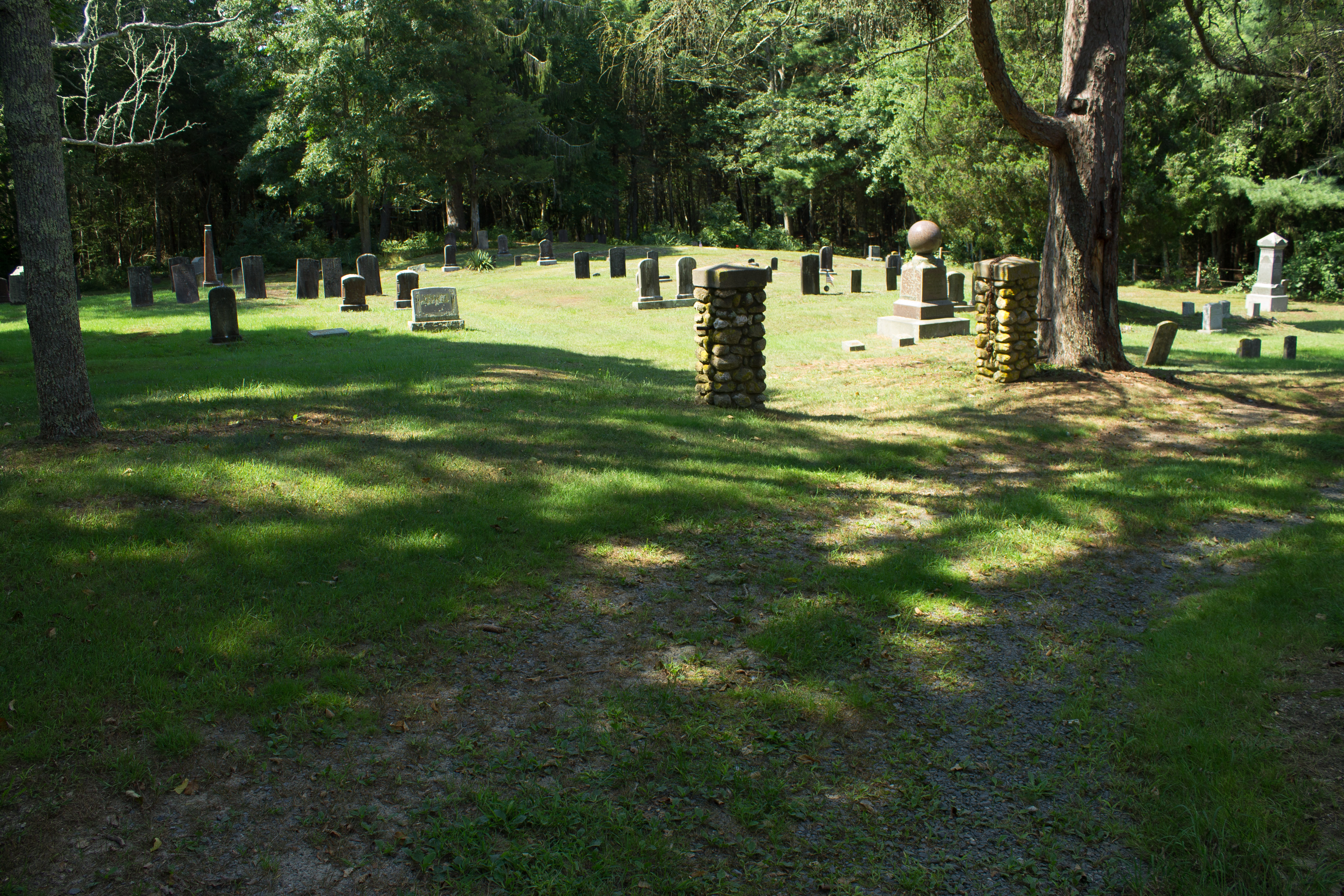

- Location within Massachusetts Location within the United States
- Location: Rochester, Massachusetts
- Coordinates: 41°47′5″N 70°46′39″W
- Area: 1.25 acres (0.51 ha)
- Built: 1828
- Architect: Look, Jacob; Blake, William and Co.
- Architectural style: Greek Revival
- NRHP reference No.: 07001361
- Added to NRHP: January 9, 2008

The East Rochester Church and Cemetery Historic District is a historic district at 355 County Road in Rochester, Massachusetts. It encompasses the East Rochester Church building, now owned by the local historical society, and the adjacent cemetery. The church was built in 1857 for a Methodist congregation founded in 1854, and is a little-altered example of a Greek Revival church building; it was used for services until 2001, and given to the Rochester Historical Society in 2003. Also on the church property is a c. 1900 four-seat outhouse. The cemetery's oldest burial date to 1828.

The district was added to the National Register of Historic Places in 2008.

== See also ==
- National Register of Historic Places listings in Plymouth County, Massachusetts
