= Plymouth Post Office Building =

- U.S. National Register of Historic Places
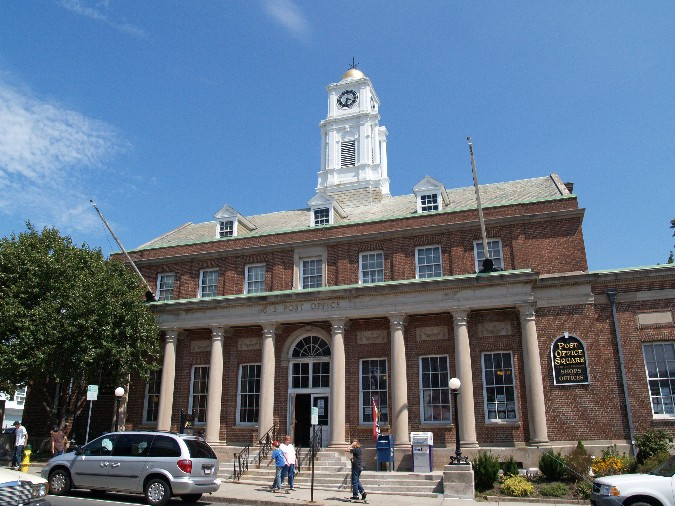

- Location within Massachusetts Location within the United States
- Location: 6 Main Street Extension, Plymouth, Massachusetts
- Coordinates: 41°57′21″N 70°39′50″W
- Built: 1913
- Architect: Oscar Wenderoth
- Architectural style: Colonial Revival
- NRHP reference No.: 86002926
- Added to NRHP: October 23, 1986

The Plymouth Post Office Building is a historic former post office building in Plymouth, Massachusetts. The building was designed by Oscar Wenderoth and built in 1914-15 by the Hanold-O'Brien Company for the federal government. The two story brick Colonial Revival building, in addition to housing the main post office branch for the town, also housed other federal government offices on the upper floor. In the 1960s the building was relegated to a branch post office. It was listed on the National Register of Historic Places in 1986. Formerly owned by Flamingo Realty Trust, the building was purchased by 1620 Capital, LLC, in September 2013.

== See also ==
- National Register of Historic Places listings in Plymouth County, Massachusetts
- List of United States post offices
