= Thomas Chubbuck Jr. House =

Historic house in Massachusetts, United States

- U.S. National Register of Historic Places
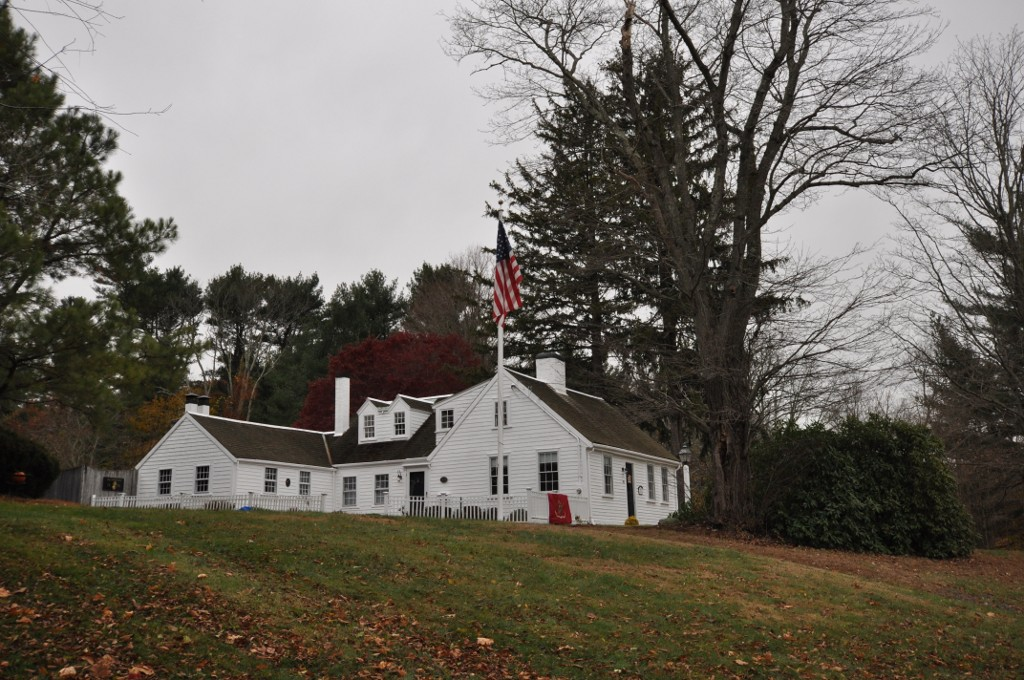

- Location within Massachusetts Location within the United States
- Location: 1191 Main Street, Hingham, Massachusetts
- Coordinates: 42°10′37″N 70°53′9″W
- Built: 1778
- Architectural style: Colonial
- NRHP reference No.: 92000954
- Added to NRHP: August 7, 1992

The Thomas Chubbuck Jr. House is a historic house in Hingham, Massachusetts. Built in 1778, it is the best-preserved three-quarter Cape style house in the town, and is further noted for its long association with locally important Chubbuck and Gardner families. The house was listed on the National Register of Historic Places in 1992.

== Description and history ==
The Chubbuck House is set on the west side of Main Street (Massachusetts Route 228), a short way north of Whiting Street in southern Hingham. The house is a 1 1/2-story wood-frame structure, with a main block and a series of discreet additions to the rear. The main block is four bays wide (instead of the more common five, hence three-quarters the number of windows), with the entrance in the left center bay. It has a side-gable roof, central chimney, and clapboard siding, and rests on a granite foundation. Its windows are set close the eave, and are, like the entrance, simply framed. The interior retains a substantial amount of original detail, including plaster and woodwork, and an original beehive oven in the kitchen fireplace.

The land on which the house was built in 1778 by Thomas Chubbuck Jr., a farmer and American Revolutionary War soldier who was descended from Thomas Chubbuck (d. 1676), one of Hingham's first settlers. The house is the only one in Hingham known to be built by one of Chubbuck's descendants, and is one of only two three-quarter Capes from the period (out of more than 100 Cape style houses in the town). It remained in the family until 1850, when it was sold to Nancy Whiton Gardner. The Gardners, also descended from an early Hingham family, retained ownership of the property until 1960.

== See also ==
- National Register of Historic Places listings in Plymouth County, Massachusetts
