= First Trinitarian Congregational Church =

Historic church in Massachusetts, United States

- U.S. National Register of Historic Places
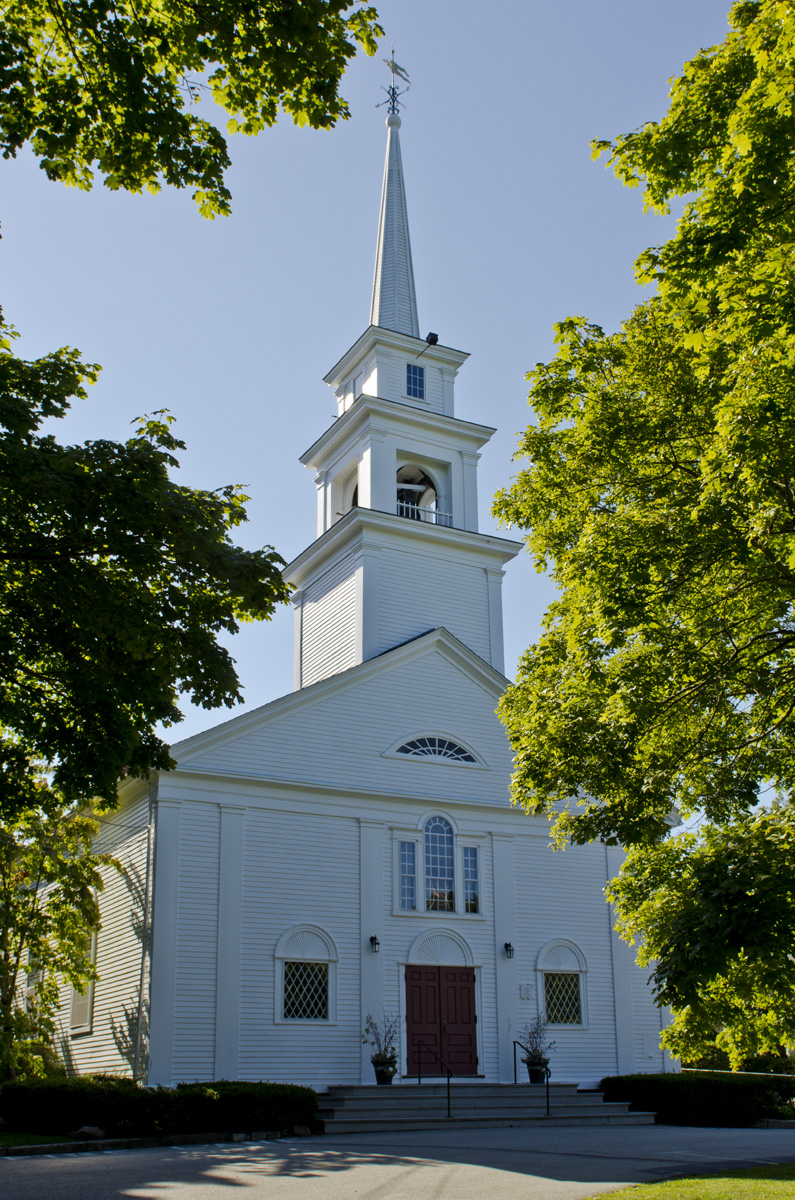

- Location within Massachusetts Location within the United States
- Location: Scituate, Massachusetts
- Coordinates: 42°12′0″N 70°45′37″W
- Built: 1826
- Architect: Rev. Daniel Wright, Jr.; et al.
- Architectural style: Classical Revival
- NRHP reference No.: 02001037
- Added to NRHP: September 12, 2002

The First Trinitarian Congregational Church is a historic Congregational church at 381 Country Way in Scituate, Massachusetts; it is associated with the United Church of Christ. The Classical Revival church building was constructed in 1826 after its congregation had left the First Parish Church of Scituate when it became Unitarian in theology. The church building was added to the National Register of Historic Places in 2002.

== Description and history ==
The First Trinitarian Congregational Church is located about two miles east of the center of Scituate on Country Way, a historically important north–south route through the community. The main sanctuary is a 2 1/2-story wood-frame structure, with a front facing gable roof, clapboard siding, and a granite foundation. Its front (east-facing) facade is symmetrically arranged, with Greek Revival pilasters at the corners and between the three bays. The entrance is in the central bay, topped by a round-arch louver and a Palladian window that has elaborate surrounding molding. The flanking bays have sash windows topped by similar louvers. The main gable is fully pedimented, with a narrow eyebrow lunette window at the center. The square tower rises above the ridge line, beginning with a plain section, above which is an open belfry with pilastered posts. This is topped by a smaller square section with narrow windows, with an octagonal spire at the very top. Attached to the sanctuary are a series of additions, resulting in a structure that has an overall U shape.

The origins of the church congregation lie in the 1634 establishment of the first church in what is now Scituate. Its early meetinghouses located nearer the coast, its fourth meetinghouse was built near the location of this one in 1737. This original congregation was divided in 1825 by the split between Trinitarian and Unitarian theology. Although the Unitarians retained the fifth meetinghouse, the Trinitarians insisted on retaining the moniker "First" as hewing more closely to the teachings of the 1630s congregation. They built this church in 1826, about 0.5 miles (0.80 km) north of the fifth meetinghouse. Significant alterations to the original building since its construction include replacement of the original cupola with a spire, and a redesign of the front and gallery in the 1890s.

== See also ==
- National Register of Historic Places listings in Plymouth County, Massachusetts
