= Forest Avenue School =

- U.S. National Register of Historic Places
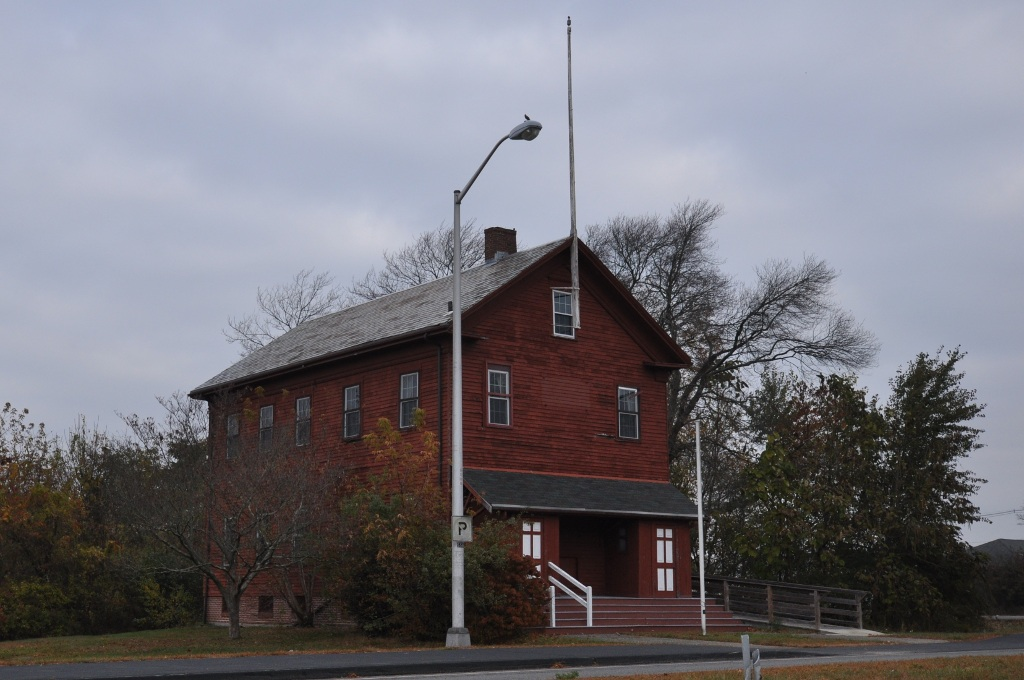

- Location within Massachusetts Location within the United States
- Location: Brockton, Massachusetts
- Coordinates: 42°4′11″N 71°2′27″W
- Built: 1875; 151 years ago
- NRHP reference No.: 82004425
- Added to NRHP: July 15, 1982

The Forest Avenue School is a historic one-room schoolhouse in Brockton, Massachusetts. The school, originally located on Forest Avenue, was built in 1875 and operated until 1963. It is a two-story wood-frame structure, with a single classroom on the first floor, and an open play area on the second. The building was moved to the (then) new Brockton High School grounds, on Concord Avenue (now Memorial Drive), in 1969. It currently serves as the Little Red Schoolhouse Museum with exhibits of local history.

The building was listed on the National Register of Historic Places in 1982.

== See also ==
- National Register of Historic Places listings in Plymouth County, Massachusetts
