= Cove Street Historic District =

Historic district in Massachusetts, United States

- U.S. National Register of Historic Places
- U.S. Historic district
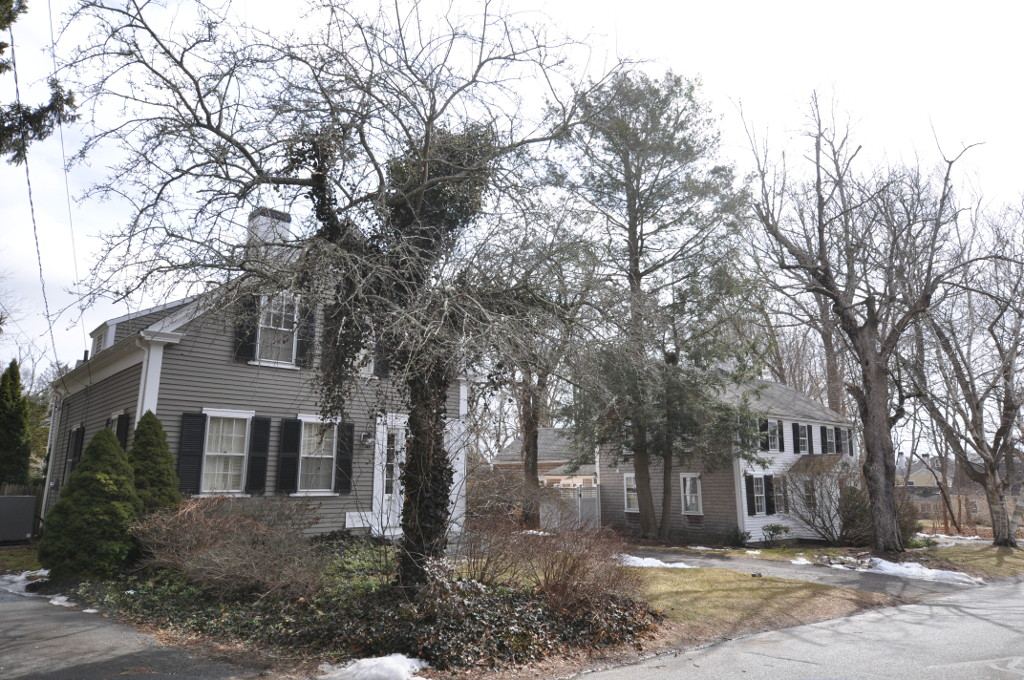

- Location within Massachusetts Location within the United States
- Location: 22-66 Cove St. & 56 Old Cove Rd.
- Coordinates: 42°2′59″N 70°40′18″W
- Area: 6.2 acres (2.5 ha)
- Architect: Multiple
- Architectural style: Greek Revival, Federal, Colonial Revival
- NRHP reference No.: 100003964
- Added to NRHP: May 28, 2019

The Cove Street Historic District encompasses a small 19th-century neighborhood area of Duxbury, Massachusetts. Located along Cove Street north of the town center, it was developed in the early 19th century to provide housing for workers in nearby shipyards. The architecture of the district includes a variety of single-family housing styles common to the region and time period. The district was added to the National Register of Historic Places in 2019.

== Description and history ==
Cove Street is a continuation of Washington Street, the north–south route that traverses the town center of Duxbury. Originally laid out as a cart path leading to hayfields, it crosses the start of the Powder Point peninsula, which extends into Duxbury Bay between the Duck Hill and Blue Fish Rivers. The historic district extends for most of its length, from Washington Street in the south to Old Cove Road in the north. All of the principal buildings in the district are single-family wood-frame structures, built (or remodeled) in 19th-century styles, except for two Colonial Revival houses dating to the 1920s. Of the twelve houses, six are Federal in style and three are Greek Revival, while one is Italianate.

The area started out rural, but shipbuilding began to develop as an industry on the Blue Fish River as early as 1764. Between then and the early decades of the 19th century, shipyards arose on both nearby rivers. A bridge was built across the Blue Fish River in 1803, spurring residential development on Cove Street. By then, the area consisted of estate holdings of two shipyard owners (separated by Cove Street), who proceeded to subdivide their properties for residential development. The area declined in the second half of the 19th century, as the town's shipyards also declined.

== See also ==
- National Register of Historic Places listings in Plymouth County, Massachusetts
