= Conant's Hill Site =

- U.S. National Register of Historic Places
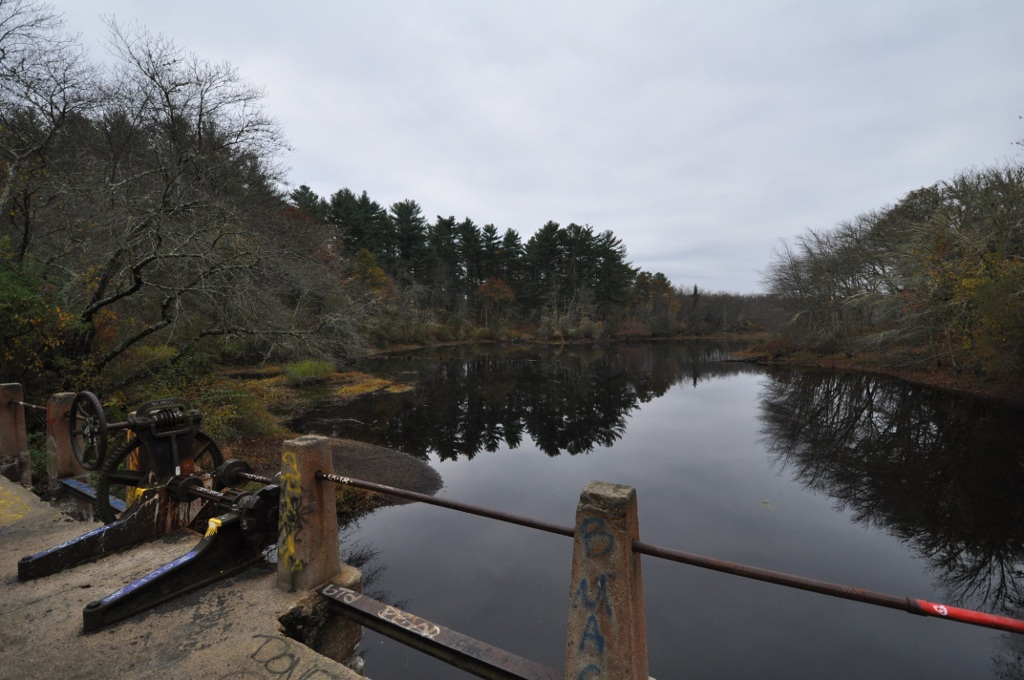
- View of Horseshoe Pond from the dam
- Location: End of Station St., 1/2 mile south of Main St., Wareham, Massachusetts
- Area: 23 acres (9.3 ha)
- NRHP reference No.: 09000091
- Added to NRHP: November 25, 1983

Conant's Hill Site is an archaeological site in Wareham, Massachusetts. The area, located around Horseshoe Pond just north of Interstate 195, is a multicomponent site that includes both industrial remains dating to the 18th century, and Native American artifacts. During excavations in 1947, remains of four Native Americans were exhumed, along with a lead ring, evidence that they were post-contact burials. The site also includes a midden, with prehistoric artifacts dating as far back as the Late Archaic.

The site was listed on the National Register of Historic Places in 1983.

== See also ==
- National Register of Historic Places listings in Plymouth County, Massachusetts
