= Howard Home for Aged Men =

- U.S. National Register of Historic Places
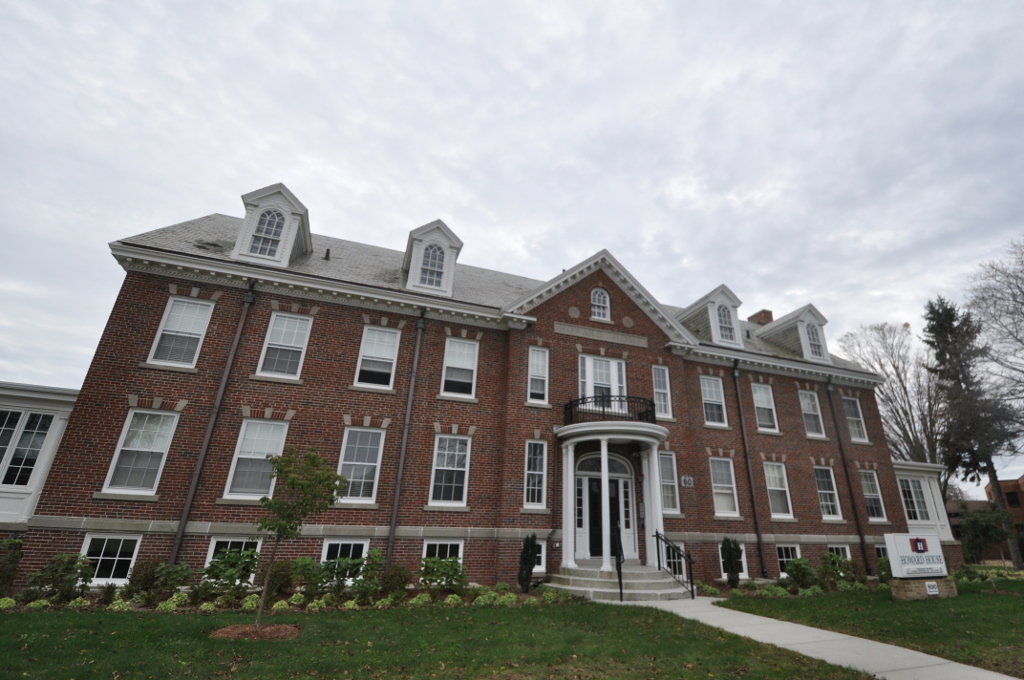

- Location within Massachusetts Location within the United States
- Location: on the campus of the Brockton VA, 940 Belmont St., Brockton, Massachusetts
- Coordinates: 42°3′56″N 71°3′11″W
- Built: 1924
- Architect: Ralph Jackson
- Architectural style: Georgian Revival
- NRHP reference No.: 16000871
- Added to NRHP: December 20, 2016

The Howard Home for Aged Men, more recently Building 60, is a historic residential care building on the campus of the Brockton Veterans Administration facility at 940 Belmont Street in Brockton, Massachusetts. Built in 1924, it was one of two institutions in the city specifically for the care of elderly men. It was taken over by the VA in 1949, and is being rehabilitated for use as veteran housing. It was listed on the National Register of Historic Places in 2016.

== Description and history ==
The former Howard Home for Aged Men is one of the oldest buildings on the campus of the Brockton VA. The campus is on the south side of Belmont Street just east of Massachusetts Route 24, and the Howard Home stands near the road at the campus's northeast corner. It is a 2 1/2-story brick building, with a dormered gable roof and stone trim elements. The main facade is eleven bays wide, with the center three projecting slightly under a gabled wall dormer. Most of the windows are rectangular sash, set in openings with stone sills and splayed lintels of brick and stone. The entrance is at the center, sheltered by a semicircular portico supported by Corinthian columns and topped by a metal balustrade. A Palladian-style three-part window is set above the entrance, and a round-arched window is set in the gable above. The interior has undergone a variety of alterations over the years, reflective of regular adaptive reuse of the building by the VA.

The home was established in 1924, funded with a bequest from Horace Howard of Providence, Rhode Island, whose family was long prominent in Bridgewater, which Brockton was originally part of. The building served in this role until 1949, when it was taken by the state as part of a new Veterans Administration facility. The building has seen numerous uses by the VA, including as nurse housing and office space. It is in 2016-17 undergoing rehabilition for use as housing for veterans.

== See also ==
- National Register of Historic Places listings in Plymouth County, Massachusetts
