= South Hingham Historic District =

Historic district in Massachusetts, United States

- U.S. National Register of Historic Places
- U.S. Historic district
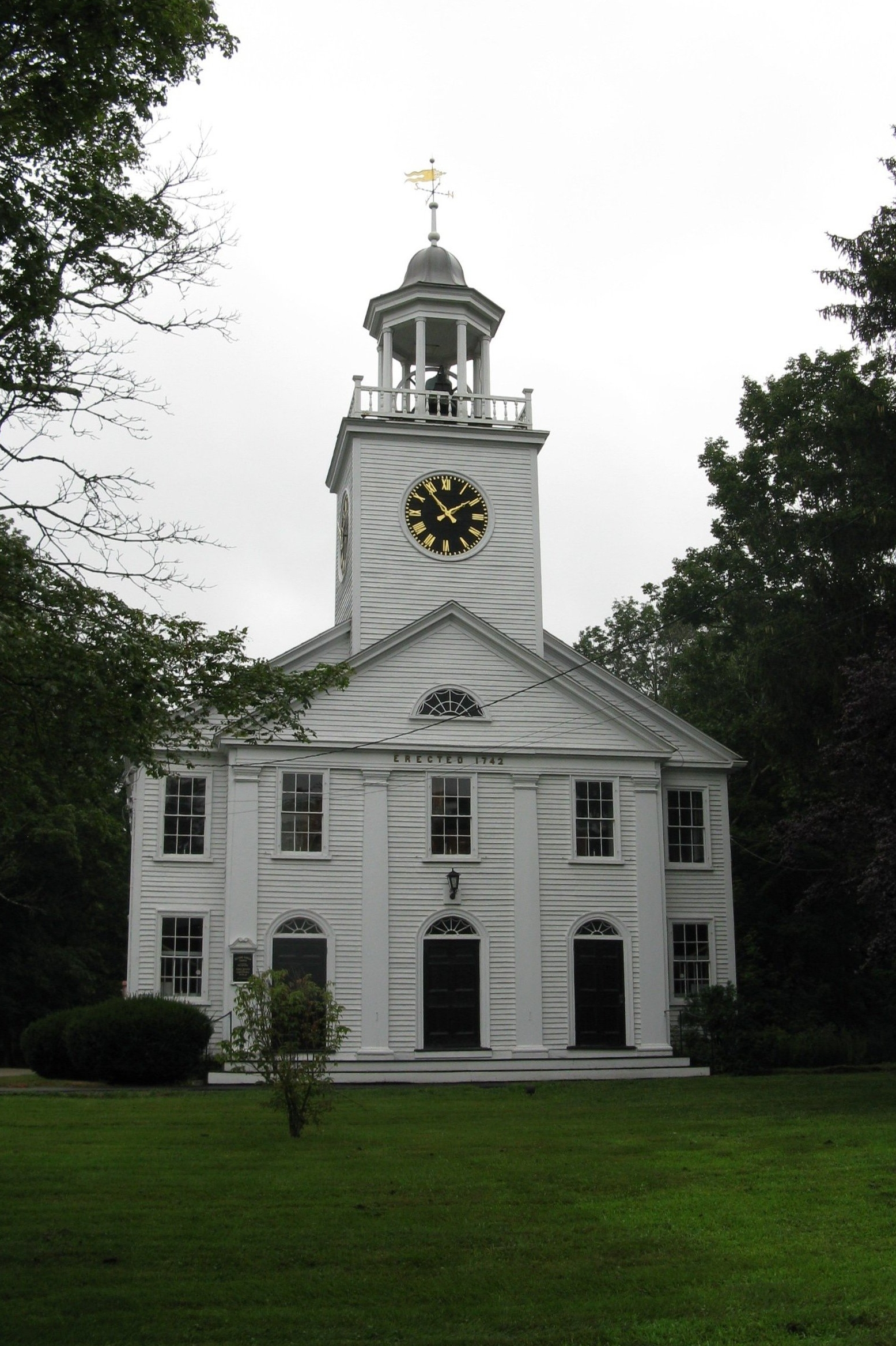
- Second Parish Church

- Location within Massachusetts Location within the United States
- Location: Hingham, Massachusetts
- Coordinates: 42°12′40″N 70°53′6″W
- Area: 224.5 acres (90.9 ha)
- Architect: multiple
- Architectural style: Colonial, Federal, Greek Revival
- NRHP reference No.: 98000838
- Added to NRHP: July 24, 1998

The South Hingham Historic District is a historic district roughly along Main St., from Cushing St. to Tower Brook Road in Hingham, Massachusetts. This area of Main Street is predominantly residential, and is distinctive for its boulevard-like character, which was envisioned in town planning documents as early as the late 17th century. A significant feature of the area is the presence of conservation land behind the properties on much of this stretch of Main Street, which has effectively throttled large-scale development. These properties include the Jacob Meadow, Mildred Cushing Woods, and Crooked Meadow River Area. The oldest structure in the district is the 1650 Edward Wilder House at 597 Main Street.

The district was added to the National Register of Historic Places in 1998.

== See also ==
- National Register of Historic Places listings in Plymouth County, Massachusetts
