= New England Telephone and Telegraph Engineering Office =

- U.S. National Register of Historic Places
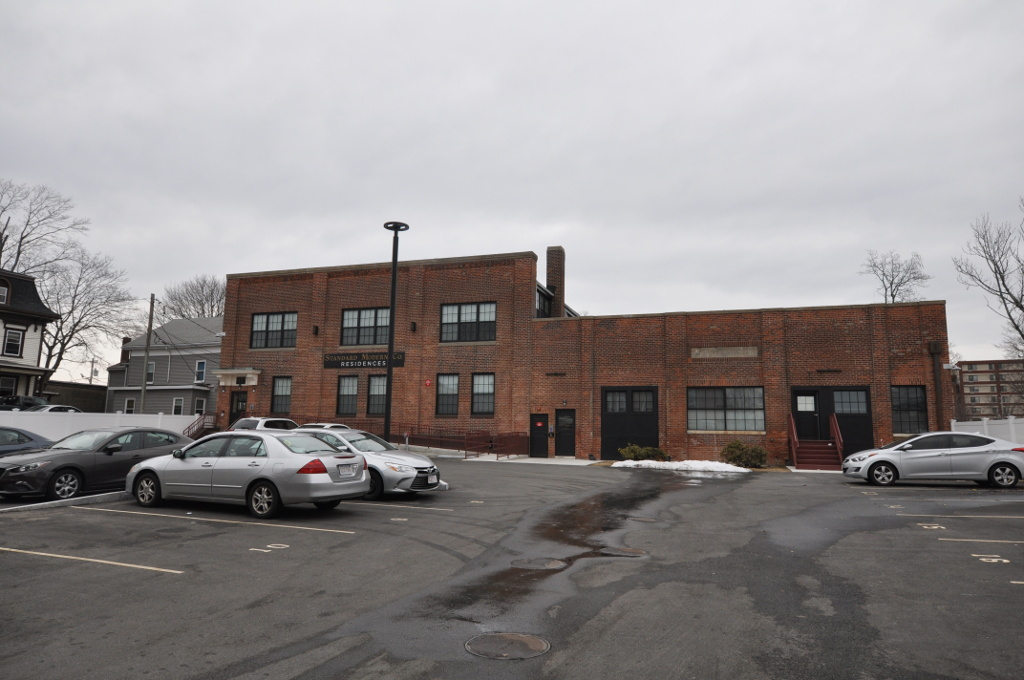

- Location within Massachusetts Location within the United States
- Location: 47 Pleasant St., Brockton, Massachusetts
- Coordinates: 42°5′8″N 71°1′16″W
- Area: less than one acre
- Built: 1923
- Architect: Charles T. Olson
- Architectural style: Classical Revival
- NRHP reference No.: 100004052
- Added to NRHP: December 3, 2019

The New England Telephone and Telegraph Engineering Office is a historic commercial building at 47 Pleasant Street in Brockton, Massachusetts. Built in 1923, this Classical Revival building house support services for the main exchange of the local telephone company until about 1950, and has seen other commercial uses since then. It was listed on National Register of Historic Places in 2019 for its architecture, and the role the telephone company played in Brockton's 20th-century growth. It has more recently been converted to residential use.

== Description and history ==
The former New England Telephone and Telegraph Engineering Office is located a short way west of North Main Street in downtown Brockton, on the north side of Pleasant Street. Compared to adjacent buildings, it is set comparatively far back from the street, with a parking lot in front. It is a brick building with two sections, a two-story section on the left and a single-story section on the right. The left section is divided into three bays, articulated by projecting brick piers. Each bay has two windows on the ground floor and a band of three windows on the second, except the leftmost bay, where the main building entrance is located. The right section is a tall single story, also with three bays, although these are of irregular size. The left bay has two pedestrian entrances, the center bay has a large two-panel garage door, and the right bay has a band of two sash windows.

The building was designed by Brockton architect Charles Olson, and was built in 1923 for the New England Telephone and Telegraph Company. It housed offices and other service facilities ancillary to the company's main exchange building, located a few blocks to the south. The right side housed offices, while the right side housed the company garage, and its cable yard was just to the north. By 1950, portions of the building were occupied by offices of the United Shoe Machine Company, and by 1958 it was occupied by a printer.

== See also ==
- National Register of Historic Places listings in Plymouth County, Massachusetts
