= Centre and Montello Streets Historic District =

Historic district in Massachusetts, United States

- U.S. National Register of Historic Places
- U.S. Historic district
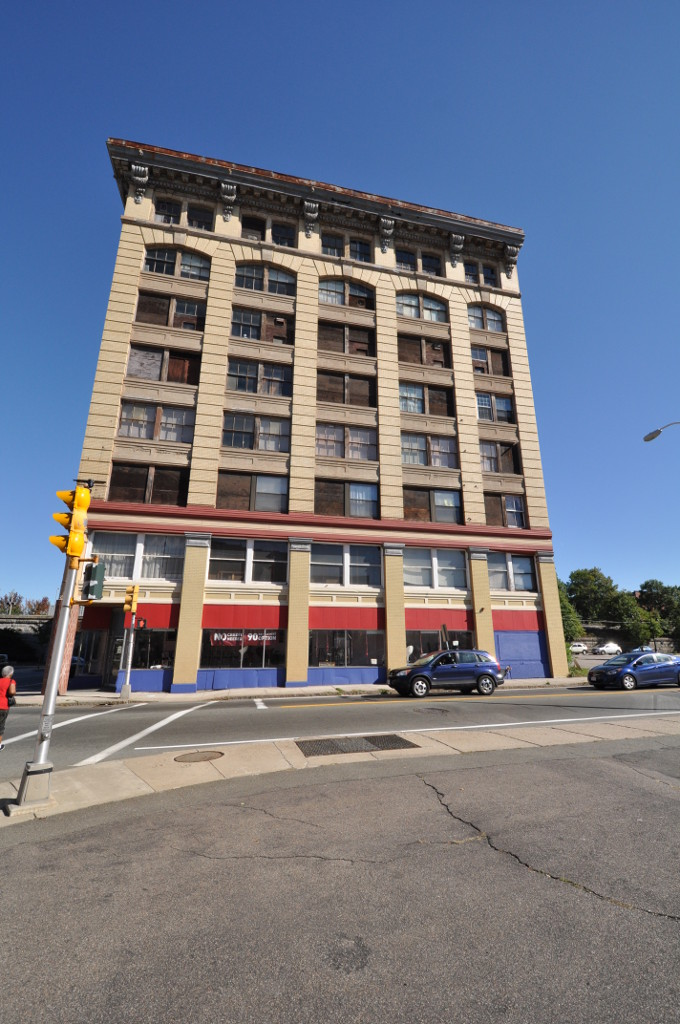
- Anglim Building, constructed 1906. Known as "Brockton's First Skyscraper" it was designed by J. Williams Beals. Upon opening the bottom three floors were the United Shoe Machinery Corporation, and the top floors were leased to printers, shoe-pattern designers, and shoe-material manufacturers, etc.

- Location within Massachusetts Location within the United States
- Location: 43–51, 53–61, 63–77, 91–93 Centre & 95, 124–126 Montello Sts. Brockton, Massachusetts
- Coordinates: 42°5′3″N 71°1′3″W
- Area: Downtown Brockton, MA
- Built: 1880s to early 1900s
- NRHP reference No.: 15000352
- Added to NRHP: June 15, 2015

The Centre and Montello Streets Historic District encompasses an area of well-preserved commercial buildings in Brockton, Massachusetts. The district extends west along Centre Street from the junction of Centre and Montello Streets in downtown Brockton, and includes a few buildings on Montello south of that intersection. The district was selected for historic status because it was thought to preserve Brockton's past as the "Shoe City". In the early 20th century Brockton was the largest manufacturer of shoes in the United States of America.

== Style ==
The buildings are typically three to five-story brick or brownstone buildings, with commercial styling characteristic of the late 19th and early 20th centuries. The Lily, Brackett & Co. Shoe Factory at 124–126 Montello Street is believed to be the oldest brick shoe factory building in the city. The district has been home to many types of tenants including, but not limited too: messianic lodges, shoe factories, insurance agencies, rubber stamp companies, and more.

The district was listed on the National Register of Historic Places in 2015.

== See also ==
- National Register of Historic Places listings in Plymouth County, Massachusetts
