= Myles Standish Park =

- Myles Standish Park and Myles Standish Home Site
- U.S. National Register of Historic Places
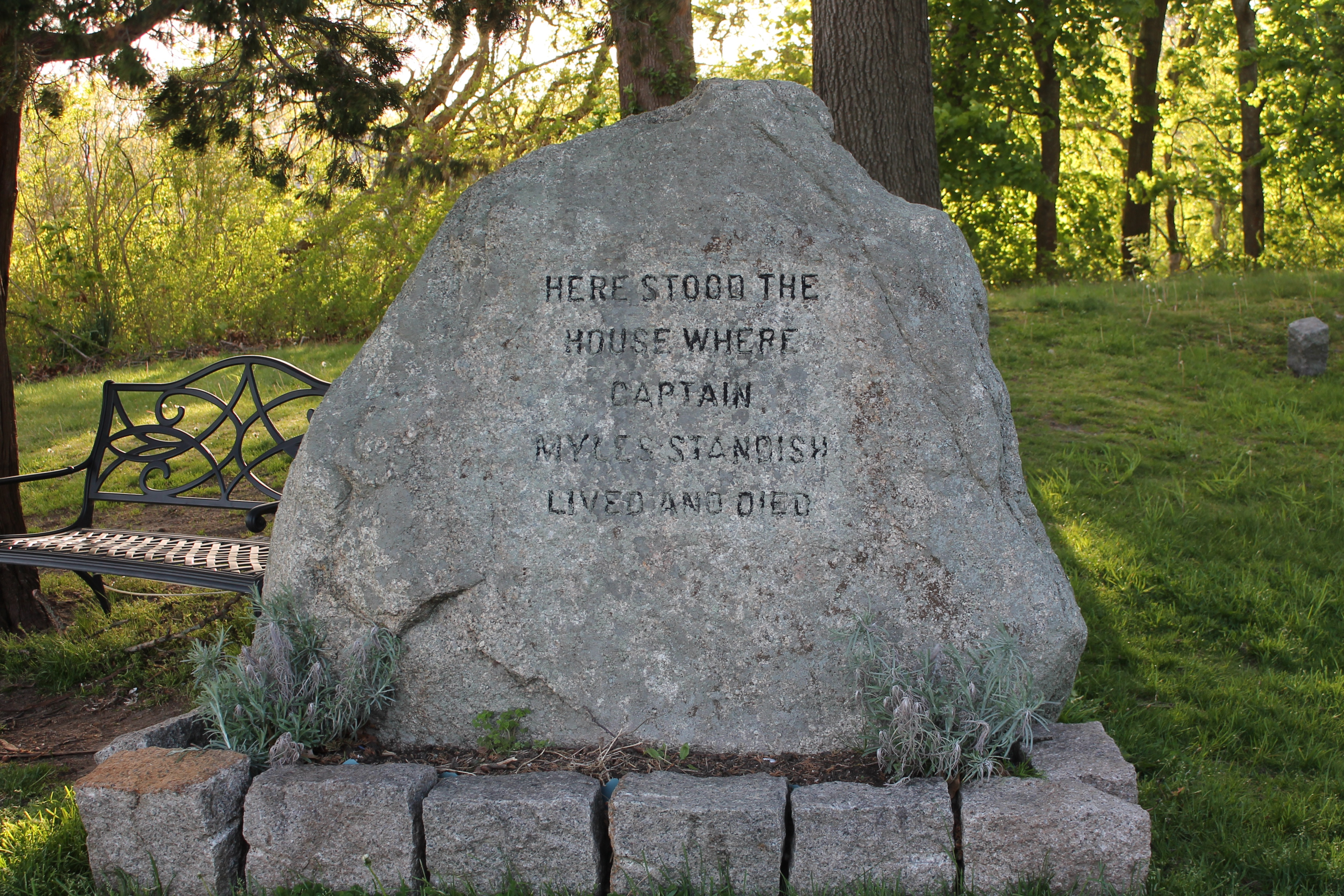
- Marker at the home site

- Location within Massachusetts Location within the United States
- Location: 0 Mayflower Dr., Duxbury, Massachusetts
- Coordinates: 42°0′27″N 70°40′28″W
- Area: 1.04 acres (0.42 ha)
- NRHP reference No.: 100006091
- Added to NRHP: February 4, 2021

Myles Standish Park is a municipal park in the town of Duxbury, Massachusetts. It consists of a 1-acre (0.40 ha) parcel of land encompassing the former site of the home of the early Pilgrim settler Myles Standish. The park was established in 1929 after the land was given to the town by the Myles Standish Monument Association. It was listed on the National Register of Historic Places in 2021.

== Description and history ==
Myles Standish Park is located in South Duxbury, on a peninsula of land known locally as the Nook that separates Duxbury Bay and Kingston Bay. It is set just east of the southernmost tip of the peninsula, at the southern end of Mayflower Drive in a densely built residential area. The park is just over 1 acre (0.40 ha) in size. Principal features of the park include the Standish home site, which is a depression (cellar hole) demarcated by granite posts, and commemorative markers. The park offers views of Duxbury Bay to the south.

Most of the peninsula was once land belonging to Myles Standish, the military leader of the Plymouth Colony and its principal military advisor during its early years. Standish was one of Duxbury's founding residents, and has been memorialized in many ways for his role in colonial history. This parcel of land remained in the Standish family until 1726, with Standish's house apparently succumbing to fire in the 17th or 18th century. The site saw some agricultural use, but its role as Standish's homestead was well known, and it became of archaeological interest in the late 19th century. The Myles Standish Monument Association acquired most of the land for the park in 1925, which was deeded to the town four years later. It was formally dedicated on September 17, 1929.

== See also ==
- National Register of Historic Places listings in Plymouth County, Massachusetts
