= The Tack Factory =

- U.S. National Register of Historic Places
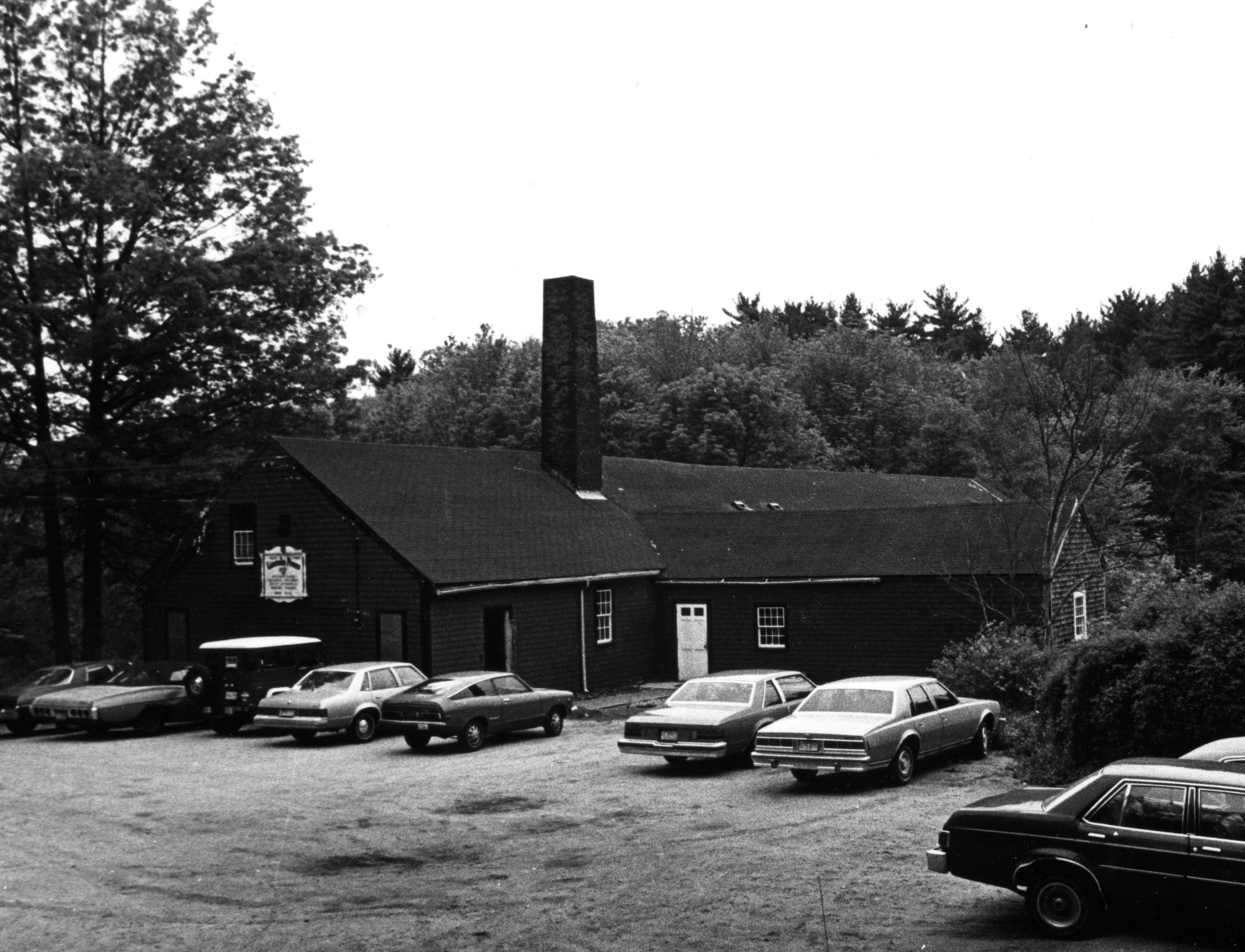

- Location within Massachusetts Location within the United States
- Location: 49 Tiffany Rd., Norwell, Massachusetts
- Coordinates: 42°7′21″N 70°48′33″W
- Area: 1.27 acres (0.51 ha)
- Built: 1834
- NRHP reference No.: 80000472
- Added to NRHP: December 3, 1980

The Tack Factory was a historic industrial facility at 49 Tiffany Road in Norwell, Massachusetts, United States. With its oldest portion dating to 1834, it was the last surviving 19th-century mill building in Norwell prior to its destruction by fire in 1983. It was listed on the National Register of Historic Places in 1980. For most of its history it was used in the manufacture of tacks.

== Description and history ==
The Tack Factory was set on the west side of Tiffany Road, just south of Tiffany Pond. At the southern end of the pond stands a dam, probably built in the early 20th century, which replaced an older 18th-century dam probably built for the grist mill that first stood at the site. The main building, which stood across Third Herring Brook, was a single-story post-and-beam structure with a broad gable roof. Its exterior had been covered with several layers of wood shingling, and a tall 30-foot (9.1 m) brick chimney rose from the north slope of the roof. Underneath the building was a granite sluiceway, in which the old waterwheel and related equipment could be found. The main building was enlarged by three relatively small frame additions.

The factory was built in 1834 by Zephaniah Talbot and Samuel Salmond, who had acquired the water rights of the 18th-century mill that previously stood on the site. The Salmond family (and later the Sylvester family) operated the factory, producing tacks for shoemaking and other industries for many years, until the mid-20th century. The last occupant of the property was a printing company.

The factory was listed on the National Register of Historic Places in 1980. It was destroyed by fire in 1983.

== See also ==
- National Register of Historic Places listings in Plymouth County, Massachusetts
