= Town Hall (Lakeville, Massachusetts) =

- U.S. National Register of Historic Places
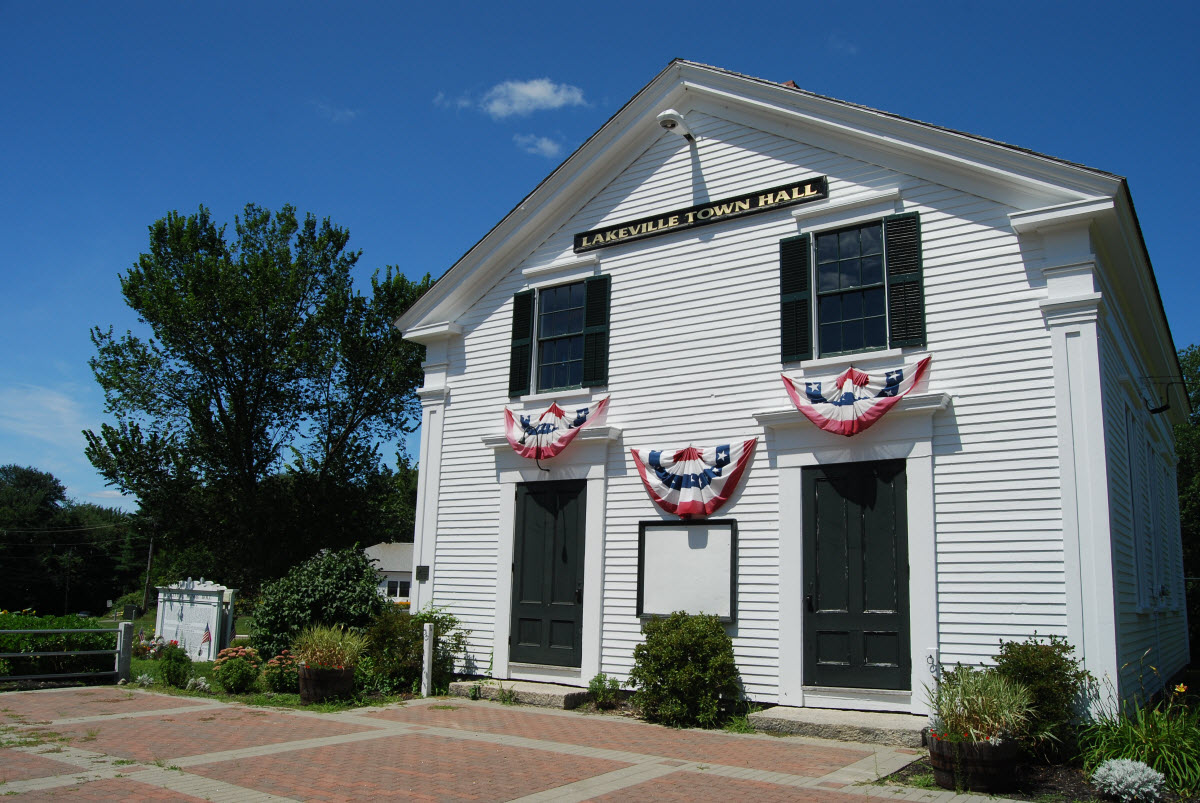
- Old Town Hall

- Location within Massachusetts Location within the United States
- Location: Lakeville, Massachusetts
- Coordinates: 41°50′45″N 70°57′2″W
- Area: less than one acre
- Built: 1856
- Architectural style: Greek Revival
- NRHP reference No.: 76000955
- Added to NRHP: October 22, 1976

The Old Town Hall of Lakeville, Massachusetts, is located at 2 Precinct Street. Built in 1856, it is an excellent example of a 19th-century Greek Revival town hall. The building originally housed town offices as well as hosting town meetings; it is now used primarily for the latter function. The hall was listed on the National Register of Historic Places in 1976.

== Description and history ==
Lakeville's Old Town Hall is located in its main village, at the northwest corner of Precinct and Bedford Streets. It is a 2-1/2 story wood frame structure, with a gabled roof and clapboarded exterior. Its corners have paneled pilasters, which rise to an entablature that runs along the building sides, and to short gable returns on the front facade. The front is symmetrical, with a pair of entrances, each framed by pilasters and corniced entablatures. The second-floor windows are set directly above the entrances, and are topped by projecting caps. An original noticeboard is mounted on the wall between the two entrances. The interior of the ground floor is a single large chamber, with stairs leading up to the second floor. The second floor houses an enclosed area that historically housed town offices. The principal alteration to the interior is the installation of a dropped ceiling in the meeting hall.

The building was erected in 1856, and was the town's principal civic building for nearly a century. In addition to hosting town meetings, it has also at times housed the local library, and the offices of the town selectmen. The non-meeting elements of town government were moved to new facilities in 1952. This building continues to serve as a community meeting space.

The CURRENT, active Town Hall is located at 346 Bedford Street, Lakeville, MA 02347. This is a long BRICK building, which included the Fire Department. Click here for picture: https://www.google.com/maps/place/Lakeville+Town+Hall/@41.84087,-70.9447493,3a,75y,243.5h,90t/data=!3m6!1e1!3m4!1sqfwThPo2ELawNrxeShXNVw!2e0!7i16384!8i8192!4m5!3m4!1s0x89e4ecf99c642a8b:0x5209949e4bfe1954!8m2!3d41.84059!4d-70.9455146

== See also ==
- National Register of Historic Places listings in Plymouth County, Massachusetts
