= Bixby Block–Home Bank Building =

Historic building in Massachusetts, U.S.

Coordinates: 42.08345°N 71.01962°W

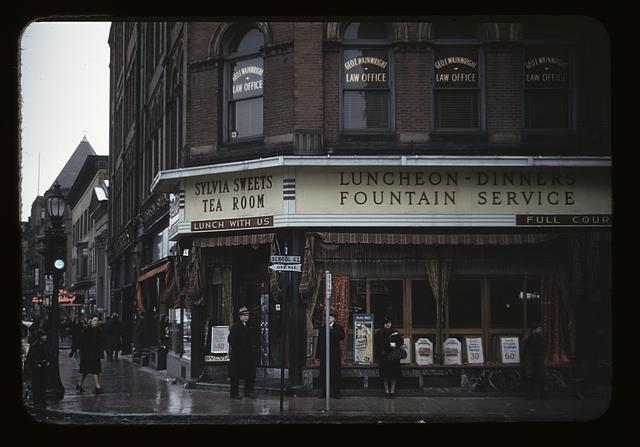

The Bixby Block–Home Bank Building was a five-story commercial structure at the corner of Main St. and School St. in Brockton, Massachusetts. Built in 1883, it was designed by local architect Wesley Lyng Minor. It was placed on the National Register of Historic Places in 1978, but was destroyed by fire in 1980 and subsequently removed from the Register.

== Description and history ==
The Bixby-Home Bank Building was located at 106 Main Street, at the corner of School Street in Brockton, Massachusetts. It was designed in the Second Empire style by local architect Wesley Lyng Minor, who also was the architect for the Brockton City Hall. It had a brick facade and mansard roof. It housed shops, offices and apartments, with the appearance of the shop fronts varying over time.

It was nominated for the National Register of Historic Places in 1976, and placed on the Register on March 29, 1978.

In January 1980, while the building was being renovated as part of the Mainbrook urban renewal project, it was destroyed by fire.
