= C.P. Washburn Grain Mill =

- U.S. National Register of Historic Places
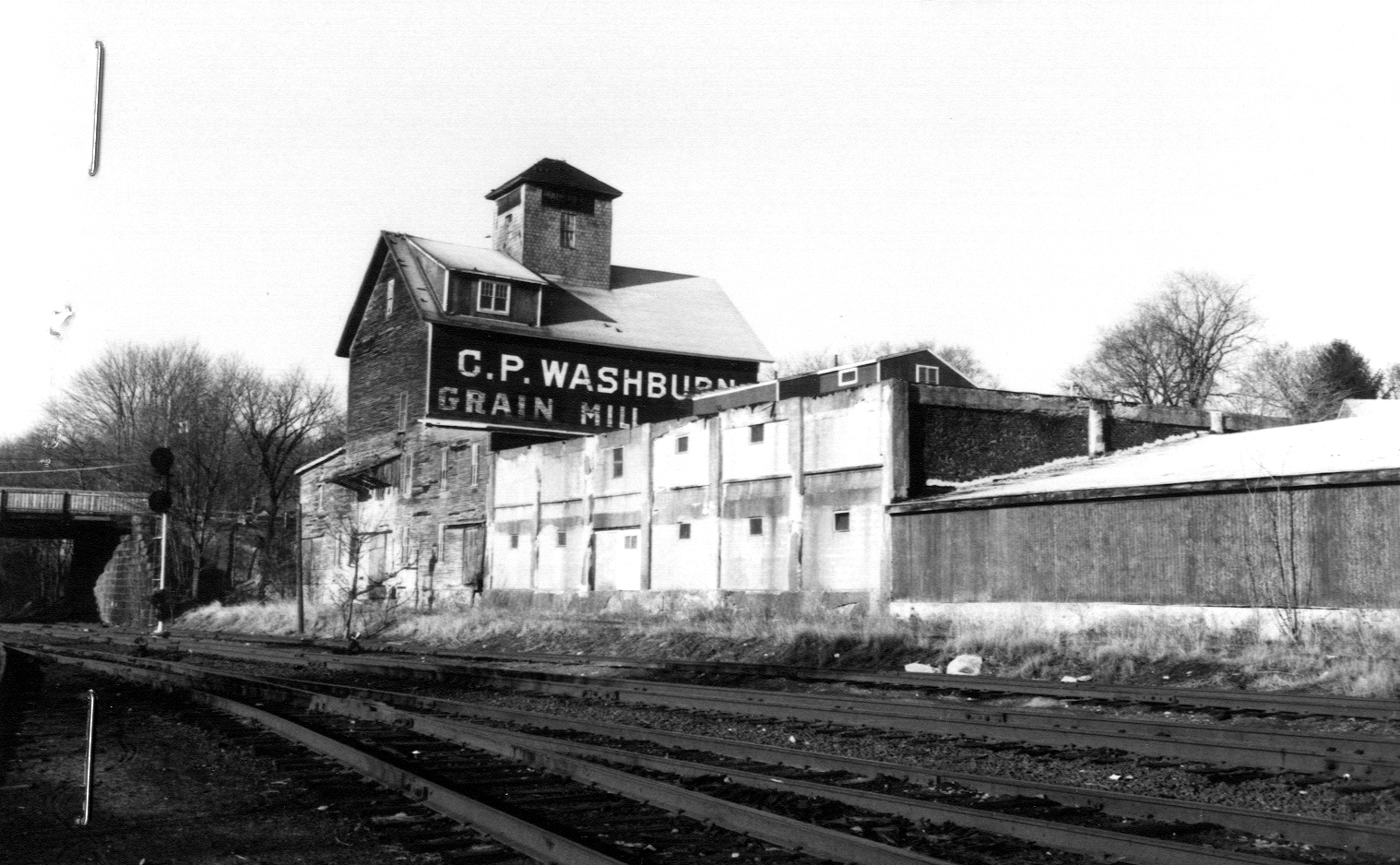
- c. 1985 photo

- Location within Massachusetts Location within the United States
- Location: Central and Cambridge Sts., Middleboro, Massachusetts
- Coordinates: 41°53′37″N 70°55′10″W
- Built: 1899
- Architect: C.P. Washburn
- NRHP reference No.: 80000667
- Added to NRHP: April 8, 1980

The C.P. Washburn Grain Mill was a historic mill on Center and Cambridge Streets in Middleboro, Massachusetts.

The mill was built in 1899 by Charles P. Washburn, whose family had been involved in the milling business since its very first member, John Washburn, arrived in North America in the 1630s. It was known primarily for producing animal feed. Feed produced by the mill was important to local agriculture, including the poultry farming businesses that were common in the area in the early 1900s.

The building was listed on the National Register of Historic Places in 1980. It has since been demolished.

== See also ==
- National Register of Historic Places listings in Plymouth County, Massachusetts
