= Bradford–Union Street Historic District =

Historic district in Massachusetts, United States

- U.S. National Register of Historic Places
- U.S. Historic district
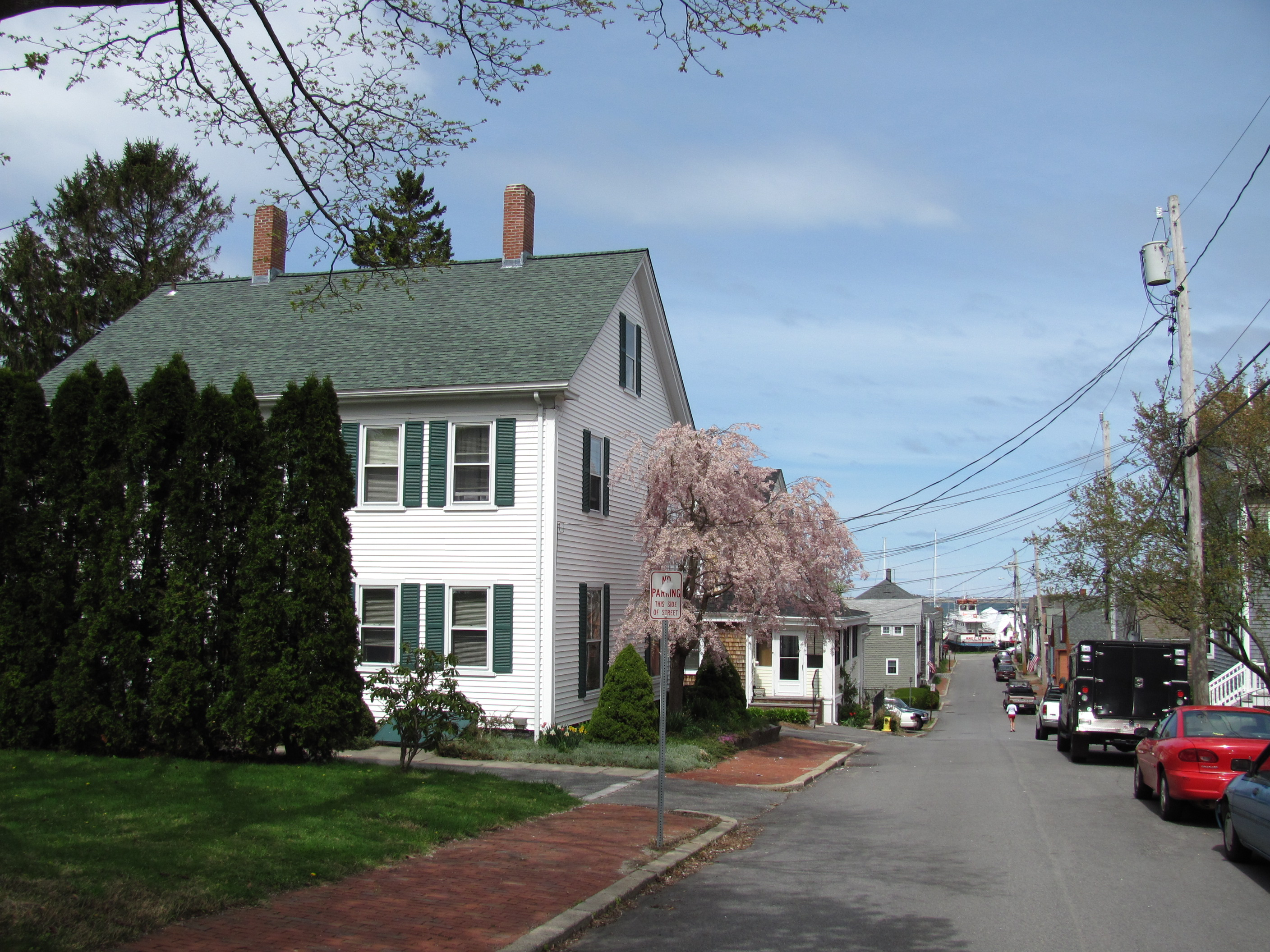
- Bradford Street

- Location within Massachusetts Location within the United States
- Location: Plymouth, Massachusetts
- Coordinates: 41°57′19″N 70°39′38″W
- Area: 7 acres (2.8 ha)
- Architectural style: Greek Revival, Gothic Revival
- NRHP reference No.: 83004094
- Added to NRHP: November 10, 1983

The Bradford–Union Street Historic District encompasses a waterfront residential area of Plymouth, Massachusetts, developed in the mid-19th for workers in local maritime and other industries. It is centered at the junction of Bradford and Union Streets, across Town Brook from downtown Plymouth. The district was added to the National Register of Historic Places in 1983.

== Description and history ==
Plymouth was settled in 1620, and developed in the 18th century as a maritime center. In the 19th century, it expanded as services for this activity grew. In 1812 the first wharf southeast of the mouth of Town Brook was built by Samuel Doten; it is now the site of a yacht club. Residences were built on the roads facing the waterfront, and on the roads rising up the hill to the south. Union Street parallels the shore, providing access to the waterfront properties, and Bradford Street and Water Streets rise southwest to join it to Sandwich Street, for many years the principal through coast road. The Bradford Street area was developed in part as a speculative venture by Alden Harlow in the 1840s, giving the area most of its character. Harlow built a number of vernacular 1-1/2 story cottages with three-bay fronts, which are the single most numerous housing type in the district.

The historic district is centered on the junction of Bradford and Union Streets. It extends southeastward along Union Street for a short distance, and northwest to the junction with Water Street. In addition to including the entirety of Bradford Street, it includes houses located on the adjacent roads: Emerald, Freedom, and Watercure Streets. The district is about 7 acres (2.8 ha) in size, and is now almost entirely residential in character, the industries on which its growth was based having either been demolished or severely altered. The principal surviving element of industry is visible in the brick structure of the Plymouth Marine Company at Union and Water Streets.

== See also ==
- National Register of Historic Places listings in Plymouth County, Massachusetts
