= Anthony Jackson (serial killer) =

American serial killer

- Born: Anthony J. Jackson; 1939 (age 86–87); Boston, Massachusetts, U.S.
- Other names: "The Hitchhike Murderer"; Wayne Eubank
- Conviction: Murder x3
- Penalty: Life imprisonment x3

Details
- Victims: 3–7
- Span of crimes: November – December 1972 (confirmed); July – December 1972 (suspected)
- Country: United States
- State: Massachusetts
- Date apprehended: December 26, 1972

Anthony J. Jackson (born 1939), known as The Hitchhike Murderer, is an American serial killer who murdered at least three young women in Massachusetts from November to December 1972. He was also suspected in four similar murders throughout that year, but he was not charged in three and was acquitted of the fourth.

Jackson was eventually convicted of his three proven crimes and sentenced to life imprisonment. The murders attracted media attention and led to widespread discussion surrounding hitchhiking during the 1970s.

== Early life and crimes ==
Little is known about Jackson's early life, aside from the fact that he was born in Boston in 1939. Beginning in the mid-1950s, he started committing crimes and was prosecuted several times on charges of assault and rape. He married to a woman in the mid-1960s, but the couple later divorced.

By late 1965, Jackson was dating 27-year-old Rosalind Weiner, a mother of three children who lived in Cambridge. The couple's relationship eventually soured and Weiner said that she no longer wanted to see him. Enraged by the rejection, Jackson went to her home on December 15, 1965, and attempted to strangle her, before shoving her head into an oven and turning on the gas. However, before he could harm her any further, he ceased his assault and went out into the street, where he asked a passer-by to call the police. When officers arrived at the scene, Jackson was found sitting and sobbing in a corner of the kitchen. Weiner was transported to a local hospital, while Jackson was interned for 35 days at the Bridgewater State Hospital for a psychiatric evaluation.

In February 1966, Jackson was ordered to appear before a grand jury for the assault charge, and was held with a $60,000 bond. He confessed to the crime, admitting that his reason for the attack was because Weiner had turned him down. As there was no further reporting on the case, it is unclear if he was convicted and whether he faced any jail time for this offense.

Jackson resumed his criminal activities into the 1970s, acting as a pimp for several underage prostitutes with whom he lived at 154 Washington Street in Dorchester. In the Boston criminal underworld, he used the alias "Wayne Eubank". In March 1972, he was arrested under this alias for the assault of a 19-year-old woman named Leona Berendson, who accused him of beating her with a coat hanger, dog chain, and steel strip after an argument at her apartment in Fall River. Jackson was charged and held under a $3,000 bond for this crime, but it is unclear what happened afterwards.

== Murders ==
=== Confirmed ===
Between November 9 and December 1972, Jackson is known to have sexually assaulted and murdered at least three female university students who hitchhiked to class or work. All the victims were strangled, with at least one additionally being stabbed and another shot; were attractive, middle-class white women; aged between 18 and 23 at the time of their deaths; and either lived in the college town of Cambridge, Boston, or the surrounding areas.

At the time, newspapers drew comparisons to the killings committed by the Boston Strangler.

=== Ellen Reich ===
Jackson's first known victim was 19-year-old Ellen Ann Reich, a native of Hackensack, New Jersey who was studying to become an attorney. Friends and relatives described her as a studious young woman with excellent communication skills that loved meeting new people and was not afraid to hitchhike by herself. On November 9, 1972, Reich left her apartment on Massachusetts Avenue in Boston to hitch a ride to her to her university, but failed to appear. Four days later, her body was found inside a closet in an apartment in Boston's Roxbury neighborhood, after former tenant Mary Lee Cobb and her friend Belin McArthur went inside to collect personal items noticed that the closet was nailed shut. Initially, the medical examiner stated that Reich had been suffocated and stabbed multiple times, but later revised his statement after determining that the supposed wounds were actually from a firearm.

The murder caused a shock throughout the area, but despite this, young women continued to hitchhike. Some of them gave interviews to the media in which they opined that the fear of potential harm was overblown and that they had never felt in danger. In response to the murder, the Boston City Council started considering tougher anti-hitchhiking ordinances consisting of fining both hitchhikers and motorists who pick them up.

Shortly after Reich's murder, public speculation tentatively linked her case to two previous similar murders that had occurred months prior, as well as a series of rapes and attempted sexual assaults around Boston. Police started searching for a potential person of interest, described as an unshaven man with dark complexion and wearing dirtied clothing who was seen picking up female hitchhikers on Commonwealth Avenue and talking obscenely to them.

Police eventually admitted that they were lacking any real leads, and sought to locate a taxi driver they believed had picked up Reich on Marlboro Street for questioning about the case.

=== Synge Gillispie ===
A little more than two weeks later, on November 29, 21-year-old Damaris Synge Gillispie of Bedford, New York left her apartment on Peters Street in Cambridge to hitch a ride to her job at the Jazz Workshop café in Boston, where she worked as a waitress. She never arrived at the location, and was reported missing. At the time of her disappearance, Gillispie just three days away from her 22nd birthday and just one month away from graduating from Boston University, where she was studying art history and was an honors student. Immediately after her disappearance, her family, together with local police, launched a massive search effort, including setting up a hotline and distributing flyers with her photo and description at colleges and universities around Boston and Cambridge.

Several days afterward, Gillispie's mother appeared on national television to plead for her daughter's safe return. Not long after, the family started receiving phone calls from across the country from people claiming to be the kidnapper and demanding ransom money, many of which were determined to be hoaxes. Between December 6 and 7, the hotline received several calls from who police believed to a middle-aged man making sarcastic remarks about supposedly knowing where Gillispie was located and accurately describing the clothing she was wearing. This led them to believe that the caller was the kidnapper, who promised to call again in a few days.

On December 10, the police received another call demanding that a $25,000 ransom be placed at a telephone booth near a supermarket in Springfield. On the next day, the same person called again repeating their demand – however, this time they managed to track it down and identified the caller as a 16-year-old teenage girl from Sanford, Maine who had a history of calling in fake emergencies such as fire alarms and bomb scares. With the help from the police in her home city, the teenager was arrested and arraigned on attempted extortion charges. It is unknown what happened to her afterwards.

=== Ruth Hamilton ===
The last confirmed victim was 23-year-old teacher Ruth Abagail Hamilton, whose body was discovered on December 24 under her roommate's bed at their rented apartment in Cambridge. Her concerned parents contacted the police after they had been unable to reach her for the previous three days, and the roommate was on vacation in Puerto Rico.

At the time her body was found, Hamilton was clad only in her underwear and bra, and had been asphyxiated to death. Since there were no apparent signs of forced entry or a struggle, police assumed that Hamilton knew her killer and let them in.

=== Suspected ===
Aside from his three confirmed victims, Jackson was believed to be responsible for at least four other murders committed in the area throughout the year. He was charged with one of these killings but was later acquitted, while he never faced charges in the other cases. These were the following:

Kathleen Ann O'Gorman (19): Went missing from her home in Brockton after waiting to catch a bus to work on July 3. Six days later, her naked and severely bruised body was found on the grounds of the Blue Hills Reservation, a state park in the southern suburbs of Boston. Unlike the other confirmed and suspected victims, O'Gorman did not the profile of Jackon's victims, as she never hitchhiked and kept to herself due to her lack of communication skills and introverted nature.

Initially, police in Brockton suspected that she might have been killed in a botched kidnapping plot to rob the bank she worked at, but this theory was never substantiated. Days after her body was discovered, police admitted that they had no viable suspects, and it would remain that way until Jackson's arrest.

Kathleen Ann Randall (18): Went missing from the grounds of the Boston University campus on September 13, just nine days after the start of her first semester. She was reported missing by her roommate six days later, after she failed to attend classes and appointments with friends over the previous few days. When informed of the situation, her parents immediately suspected that she had met with foul play due to the fact that all of her clothing and personal items were left behind.

A few weeks later, on October 1, her body was found by two hunters near a farm in Nashua, New Hampshire, nearly 80 kilometers away from where she was last seen. Due to severe decomposition, the coroner was unable to determine if she was sexually assaulted or how exactly she had been murdered, but strongly suspected that she was indeed the victim of a homicide. Randall was tentatively linked to the murder of Debra Stevens (see below) due to the fact that both were outgoing and frequently hitchhiked. In an attempt to gather more clues, police started distributing fliers around the campus of the Boston University, appealing for any information that could lead to a break in the case.

Debra Rae Stevens (19): A student at the Boston University, Stevens went missing on September 15. A few days later, a man walking his dog in Lynn found her body, which was nude from the waist down, in some lilac bushes. An autopsy concluded that she had been strangled, but there were no signs of sexual assault. On the same day that she was discovered, officers found a car belonging to Stevens' sister, Andrea, parked in front of a driveway just two blocks away from where her body was found. Upon closer inspection, two bullet holes were found inside the car; however, there were no traces of blood inside the vehicle, on the ground or on Stevens' body, leading to the conclusion that she likely been killed elsewhere. In the course of the investigation, Stevens' former roommate at the dormitory told police that the pair often hitchhiked to class without any concerns, but on the day of her disappearance, Debra borrowed her sister's car to attend evening classes. The police's theory was that Stevens picked up a hitchhiker who later killed her.

Sandra J. Ehramjian (19): Went missing on November 27 after leaving her apartment on Putnam Avenue in Cambridge to hitchhike back home to East Meadow, New York. On the following day, a body was found in Brockton's D.W. Field Park that was identified as belonging to Ehramjian after a photograph of the victim was posted in the newspaper. Like Jackson's confirmed victims, she had been sexually assaulted and strangled. At the time of her death, she was living with friends in Cambridge, working part-time as a taxi driver, and was described as a charismatic and outgoing young woman who was popular with men and easily made new friends.

=== Investigation and public reaction ===
As the murders and disappearances continued, law enforcement agencies started considering that at least some of them might be related to one another. In response to this, Massachusetts Attorney General Robert H. Quinn announced that he would hold a conference with all of the police departments in the Commonwealth and neighboring New Hampshire to discuss the murders and coordinate a strategy to resolve them.

As a show of sympathy for the victims, locals from the Greater Boston area organized a memorial service dedicated to them that took place on December 8, 1972. In a sermon led by Rev. William Wolkovich, the chaplain of the Massasoit Community College, he decried the fact that the perpetrator(s) of such crimes are able to carry them out due to what he called "our permissive society" enabling them to do so.

== Arrest and charges ==
On the evening of December 26, two police officers patrolling around Cambridge spotted a man attemping to lure a young woman into his Cadillac on Harvard Street. Upon noticing the officers approaching, the man abruptly sped off at high speeds, leading to a pursuit. In the following minutes, the officers were joined by another patrol car, disorientating the driver and causing him to crash into a nearby ditch. The man attempted to flee on foot, but as the officers were catching up to him, he took out a gun and started firing at them. The man was then shot in the stomach by Officer Joseph McSweeney, but managed to stay on his feet and attempted to flee again. A few minutes later, officers found the man hiding under a panel truck. During the subsequent search, officers found a pistol holster on the assailant, but were unable to locate the gun.

Following his arrest, the man–identifying himself as "Wayne Eubank" but later admitted that he was truly Anthony Jackson–was transported to a local hospital to undergo an emergency surgery, while authorities were investigating him for a series of rapes and assaults. When he regained consciousness, he requested a phone call and contacted the teenaged prostitutes at his apartment in Dorchester, whom he instructed to take all of his belongings and leave immediately. Since he was not yet a suspect in the murders, the police took no action to prevent this, and by the time they searched the apartment three weeks later, it was almost completely empty. The only items of note was a cardboard milk carton containing several nails. In early January, the nails were sent for testing, with an examination of the material, weight, head type, and surface groves concluding that they were identical to the nails used by Reich's killer on her body.

At around the same time, police discovered the handgun in a snowdrift near the shootout after a days-long search. The weapon was also tested, with the results of the ballistic analysis linking the bullets to the Reich murder. A test of some pubic hair found on Reich's underwear and jeans were identified as belonging to a man of African American descent, but investigators were unable to conclusively say that they were the same as their suspect's. However, an analysis of scalp hair was found to be a near perfect match to the man's hair.

=== Arrest of Jackson's wife and additional evidence ===
In late January 1973, Jackson contacted a man named Donald McDonald via his attorney, instructing him to tell his ex-wife to dispose of a green metal box that would implicate him in several murders. The ex-wife complied with the request and threw the box into the Charles River, but was then quickly detained by the police and started cooperating, agreeing to testify against him. After divers found the box at the bottom of the river, it was opened and found to contain hundreds of photographs of nude women, including a photo of Synge Gillispie, who at the time was still listed as a missing person.

Following his arrest, a number of women who were pimped out by Jackson later also agreed to testify against him. One of them, Patricia Archer, claimed that on the day Gillispie disappeared, Jackson told her that he had killed a woman and was transporting her body in the trunk of his gold-colored Cadillac, after which he demanded that she help him wash off the bloodstains. Once they were finished, he gifted her two rings, a fur-lined coat, and a pair of bloostained shoes, which were later identified as Gillispie's by family members. Her skeletal remains were finally found on February 3, 1973, in the Pine Woods area of Billerica, approximately 20 kilometers northwest of Boston. Another prostitute, Michelle Maupin, stated that she visited him in the hospital the morning after he was wounded in the shootout, but he told her to leave so she wouldn't be questioned. She returned on the day after, whereupon Jackson asked her to get his gun from the snowdrift, drawing a rough map on a scrap of paper using a pencil.

Throughout the investigation, Jackson categorically denied guilt in any of the murders, but was nonetheless charged with the murders of Reich, Gillispie, Hamilton, and Ehramjian. In order to gather further evidence against Jackson, Quinn requested that Reich's body be exhumed, as recent testing conducted on her clothing by the FBI indicated that there was gunpowder residue on it.

His first trial was scheduled for October 1973. He was also separately indicted for an attack on Maupin committed while he was in pre-trial detention, as well as yet another attack on a corrections officer, for which he was sent to Bridgewater State Hospital to undergo an evaluation.

== Trials ==
At one of the preliminary hearings, the court granted Jackson's request to separate the cases into four murder trials, with the aim of preventing the prosecution from using evidence of his guilt in one of the murders as proof of his involvement in the other crimes. During the proceedings, Jackson constantly disrupted the process, argued with the judge and prosecutors, and eventually fired several his attorneys over the course of months before finally choosing to represent himself.

A few months after his first trial began in 1974, he repeatedly attempted to harm himself; on one occasion, he swallowed a razor blade, injured his esophagus, and nearly died from internal bleeding; however, he was saved thanks to a quick intervention from medical staff. On another occasion, Jackson tried to jump out of a window during one of the preliminary hearings, but was stopped by the prison guards.

Jackson's trials took place between 1976 and 1978, and in the end, he was convicted of three murders–Reich, Gillispie, and Hamilton–and sentenced to three life terms. He was acquitted of Ehramjian's murder due to a lack of evidence.

== Imprisonment, appeals, and current status ==
After his convictions, Jackson was transferred to serve his sentence at MCI – Walpole. He attempted to appeal his conviction over the following years, but was unsuccessful, with his final appeal being denied in 1984. In it, he had argued that the jurors had been prejudiced against him due to the extensive media coverage of the murders and that the conviction for the Hamilton case be overturned due to the fact that it took five years for the case to be brought to trial, thereby depriving of his right to a speedy trial.

In regards to the Reich murder, Jackson argued that the box of nails had been obtained during an invalid search of his apartment without a warrant and therefore should have been excluded as evidence. The court rejected these arguments, citing a ruling that allowed officers to enter a rented dwelling without a warrant if the landlord permits it.

Jackson also argued that an audio recording used by the investigators at one of his trials should be excluded as evidence. The recording indicated that he and an acquaintance were discussing a newspaper article detailin several murders of young women, during which Jackson stated that he had nothing to do with the murder of the woman found in New Hampshire, but neither he nor the other person mentioned any names. According to prosecutors, the murders the two were discussing were the serial murders in 1972, and that the woman was Kathleen Randall. For his part, Jackson argued that it was unclear from the recording which article he and his acquaintance were discussing, and that the prosecution failed to substantially prove it was about the murders he was linked to. His arguments were rejected, and his appeal was denied.

In 1985, he filed a libel lawsuit against a writer for The Boston Globe on the grounds that the printed article supposedly printed several defamatory falsehoods against Jackson and the cases he was associated with. The lawsuit was quickly dismissed, and after this, there has been no verifiable information about his current status, and whether he is currently still incarcerated or even alive.

== See also ==
- List of serial killers in the United States
