= Goldthwaite Block =

- U.S. National Register of Historic Places
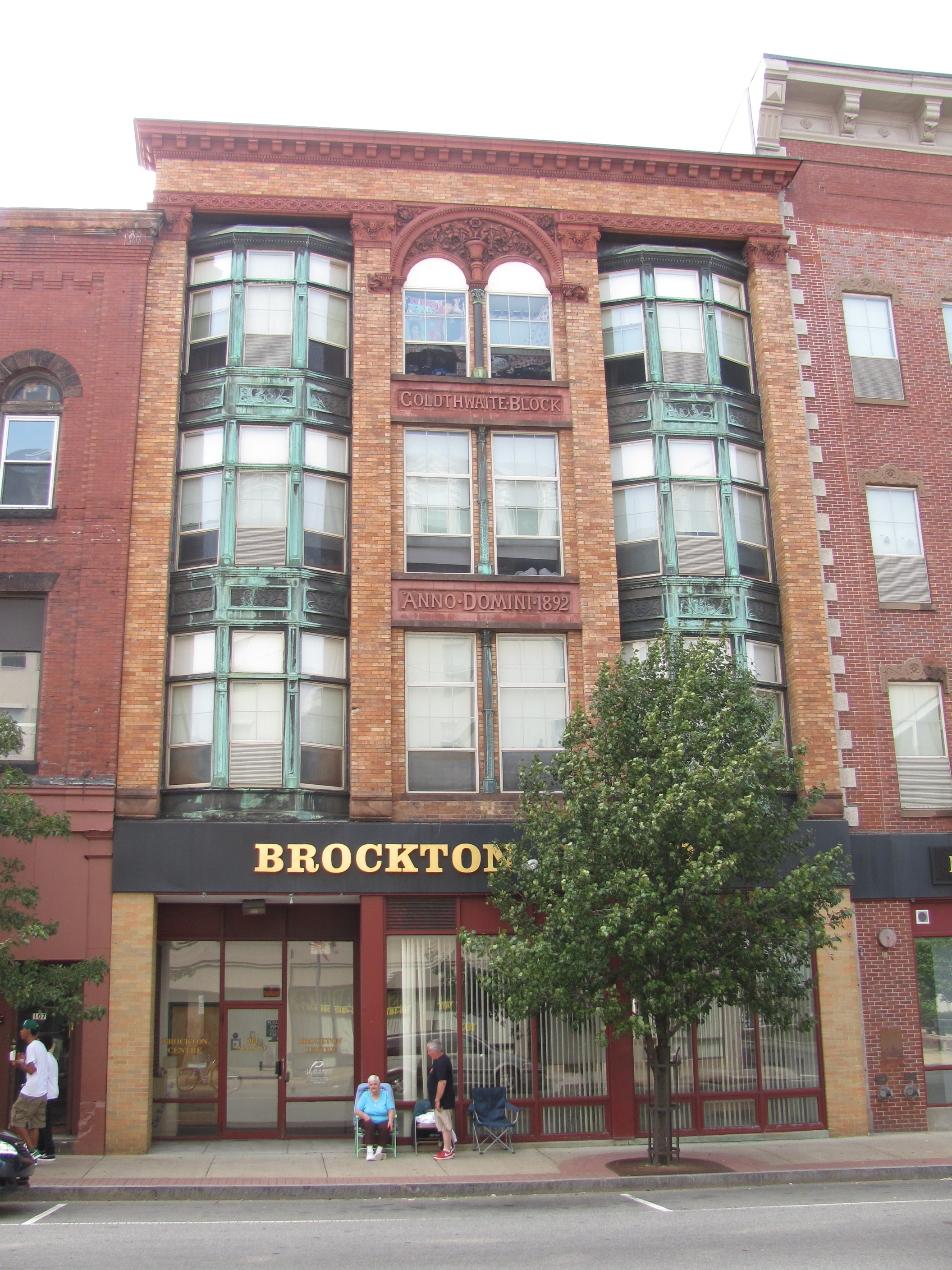
- Goldthwaite Block

- Location within Massachusetts Location within the United States
- Location: 99-103 Main St., Brockton, Massachusetts
- Coordinates: 42°5′0″N 71°1′15″W
- Area: less than one acre
- Built: 1892
- Architect: Westwood, J.
- Architectural style: Late Victorian
- NRHP reference No.: 82004427
- Added to NRHP: April 15, 1982

The Goldthwaite Block is a historic commercial building on 99-103 Main Street in Brockton, Massachusetts. Built in 1892, it forms part of one of the city's best-preserved assemblages of 19th-century commercial architecture, alongside the Lyman Block and Howard Block. The building was listed on the National Register of Historic Places in 1982.

== Description and history ==
The Goldthwaite Block is located in downtown Brockton, across Main Street from City Hall, and immediately adjacent to the Howard Block and Curtis Building, both of which it shares party walls with. It is a four-story masonry structure, built out of brick and stone. It is three bays wide, with projecting window bays on the upper floors of the two side bays, and decorative terra cotta between and above the windows of the center section. The projecting bays are clad in copper, and some of the terra cotta panels are carved with the building's name and construction date. The ground floor commercial storefronts, originally two, have been modernized and converted into a single storefront. The upper floors, also originally part of the retail space, have been converted into elderly housing.

The block was built in 1892 for Charles Goldthwaite, a local apothecary. The business had been established by Goldthwaite's uncle in 1861 as a dry goods business, which the uncle expanded after Charles completed pharmacy training in 1884. That business became Brockton's first drug store. The business's success enabled Goldthwaite to build what was considered at the time a relatively opulent building to house it. It continued in business until Goldthwaite's death in the 1930s.

== See also ==
- National Register of Historic Places listings in Plymouth County, Massachusetts
