= Boston Medical Center =

- Boston University

Geography
- Location: Boston, Massachusetts, United States
- Coordinates: 42.3349°N 71.0735°W

Organization
- Care system: Private, Medicare, Medicaid
- Type: Teaching
- Affiliated university: Boston University Chobanian & Avedisian School of Medicine

Services
- Emergency department: Level I Adult Trauma Center
- Beds: 514

Helipads
- Helipad: (FAA LID: 0MA4)
Number	Length		Surface
Number	ft	m	Surface
H1	45	14	Concrete

History
- Founded: 1855

Links
- Website: bmc.org
- Lists: Hospitals in Massachusetts

Boston Medical Center (BMC) is a non-profit 514-bed academic medical center and safety-net hospital in the South End neighborhood of Boston. As part of the Boston Medical Center Health System, the hospital provides primary and specialty care to residents of the Greater Boston area. It is also the principal teaching hospital of Boston University Chobanian & Avedisian School of Medicine and home to 66 residency and fellowship training programs.

== History ==
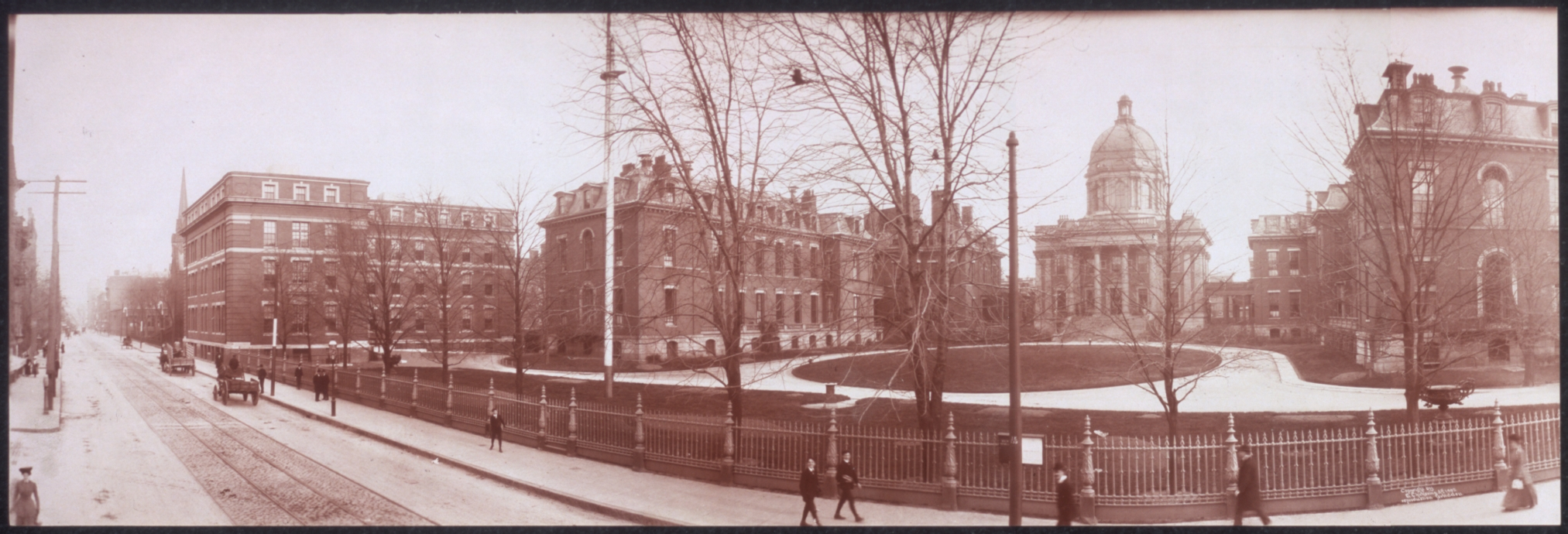
Boston City Hospital, 1903; one of two institutions merged in 1996 to form Boston Medical Center

Boston City Hospital was the first municipal hospital in the United States, opening in 1864. In 1960 Boston University's Medical School founded the Boston University Medical Center in the South End neighborhood to provide residency programs and research opportunities for students and faculty.

In 1962, Massachusetts Memorial Hospitals president Jerome Preston and Boston University president Harold C. Case announced a merger of Boston University Medical Center and the creation of a new board of trustees to oversee the institution with the stated purpose "to provide and maintain better health in contemporary society." This agreement replaced an earlier 1959 compact of association. The following year Massachusetts Memorial Hospital as a constituent of the Boston University Medical Center Hospital would announce their first year without a deficit. In 1994 Boston University Medical Center and the East Boston Community Medical Center created an equal joint partnership to purchase the Winthrop Hospital.

By 1996 Boston City Hospital had an expected budgetary loss of $150 Million dollars over the next five years. Due in large part to these issues Boston Mayor Thomas Menino was a major proponent of a merger setting a July 1 deadline for such a deal. He stated the merger is "the most important thing I will do as mayor." Boston City Council voted 9-4 on June 29 of 1996 in favor of a merging Boston City Hospital and the Boston University Medical Center to create the new Boston Medical Center. The new combined hospital had over 3,800 employees and more emergency room visits than any other hospital in New England.

From 2015 through 2018, BMC undertook a campus redesign project to update clinical spaces, improve efficiencies, and better serve patients. This project included the closure of the Newton Pavilion and the relocation of the services previously in the building to other parts of the hospital campus.

In August 2024, amid the bankruptcy proceedings of Steward Health Care, the Massachusetts governor's office announced that BMC would acquire two of Steward's hospitals. BMC on October 1, 2024 finalized its purchase of Good Samaritan Medical Center in Brockton and St. Elizabeth's Medical Center in the Brighton neighborhood of Boston, later renaming them Boston Medical Center – South and Boston Medical Center – Brighton, respectively. The Commonwealth seized the property of the latter through eminent domain to facilitate its transfer to BMC.

== Patient care and programs ==
BMC offers care in four primary care practices (Adult Primary Care, Family Medicine, Pediatrics, and Geriatrics) and more than 70 specialties and subspecialties, including seven areas that have been named US News high performers. As a Level I Trauma Center, the hospital is the busiest center for trauma and emergency services in New England, and the 11th busiest emergency department in the U.S.

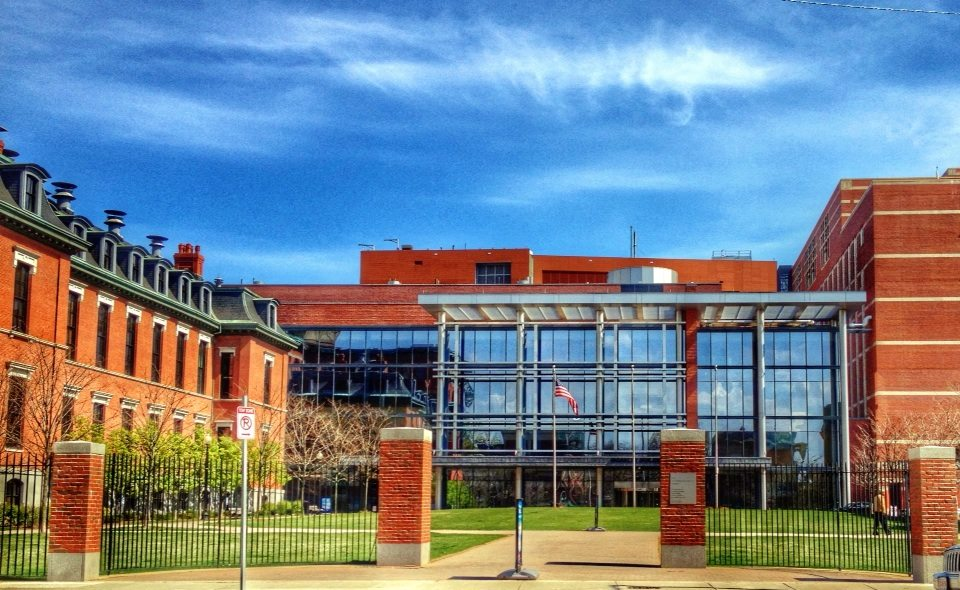
Moakley Building from Harrison Avenue

== Rooftop farm ==
Boston Medical Center has a rooftop farm, which grows produce for its patients and their food pantry program. In 2022, the farm was recognized by the White House. The farm yields some 5,600 pounds of produce each year. According to Greenroofs, "the rooftop farm has 2,658 square feet of growing space and harvests about 25 different crops".
