= Brockton Hospital =

Hospital in Brocton, Massachusetts

- Signature Healthcare

Geography
- Location: 680 Centre St, Brockton, Massachusetts, United States
- Coordinates: 42°05′14.7″N 70°59′29.2″W

Services
- Emergency department: Yes
- Beds: 216

Helipads
- Helipad: Yes

History
- Founded: 1896

Links
- Website: www.signature-healthcare.org
- Lists: Hospitals in Massachusetts

Signature Healthcare Brockton Hospital is a mid-sized non-profit community hospital located in Brockton, Massachusetts. In 2022, the hospital had 216 beds, discharged 11,336 patients, and reported 54,761 emergency department visits.

The hospital was evacuated and had closed in March 2023 due to a fire. It reopened on August 13, 2024.

== History ==
Brockton Hospital was established in 1897 as a not-for-profit community teaching hospital with 219 beds serving more than 20 communities in Southeastern Massachusetts.

In 2007, a parent company named Signature Healthcare was formed to link the hospital and its regional network of healthcare providers.

In February 2023, a fire in the hospital's basement transformer room led to a loss of power throughout the hospital with no access to its emergency generators. A full evacuation was ordered which saw 160 patients evacuated to hospitals across the region amid firefighting efforts. The hospital remained closed for over a year, reopening in August 2024. Following the closure, Good Samaritan Medical Center, the city's only other hospital, saw a 30% increase in emergency department encounters.
