= Lyman Block =

- U.S. National Register of Historic Places
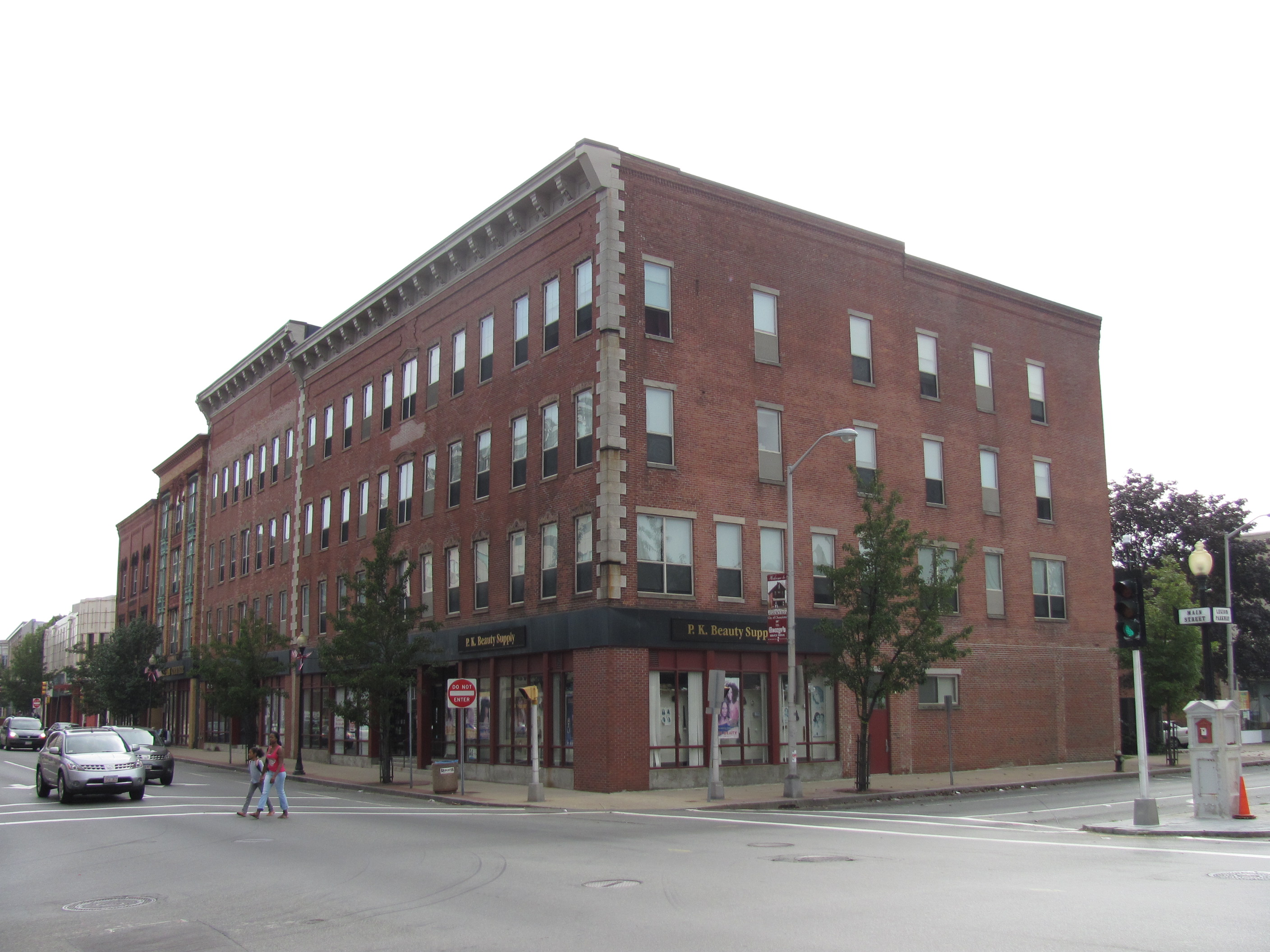
- Lyman Block

- Location within Massachusetts Location within the United States
- Location: Brockton, Massachusetts
- Coordinates: 42°5′1″N 71°1′15″W
- Built: 1876
- NRHP reference No.: 82004430
- Added to NRHP: April 15, 1982

The Lyman Block is a historic commercial building at 83-91 Main Street in Brockton, Massachusetts. Built in 1876 for a local business group, it is a fine local example of Italianate style, and one of the elements of a group of four well-preserved 19th-century commercial buildings in the city. The block was listed on the National Register of Historic Places in 1982.

== Description and history ==
The Lyman Block is located in downtown Brockton, across Main Street from City Hall, and immediately adjacent to the similar Howard Block. It is a four-story structure, built out of load-bearing brick and covered by a flat roof. It has granite corner quoining, and brownstone window lintels with keystones and shoulders. The main facade is crowned by a bracketed cornice. Most of the windows are sash, with doubled windows in the center bay, where the main entrance was originally located. The ground floor has modernized storefronts, and the entrance to the upper levels is now located on the Legion Parkway facade.

The building was built in 1876 for Lyman Clark, a local businessman and real estate developer, and a consortium of other local businessmen. They were owners of Howard Clark & Co., a local manufacturer of furniture and funerary caskets, which was one of the building's early ground-floor tenants. The upper floors were originally populated with professional offices, but there was a transition in the 20th century to light manufacturing operations. The building has now been converted into elderly housing. Along with the Howard Block, Goldthwaite Block, and Curtis Building, it forms one of the few surviving pockets of 19th-century commercial streetscape in the city.

== See also ==
- Howard Block, next door
- National Register of Historic Places listings in Plymouth County, Massachusetts
