= Levi Lewis Dorr =

American physician (1840–1934)

Levi Lewis Dorr (April 1840 – September 10, 1934) was an American Civil War veteran and physician. He served at the Battle of Antietam, and as a physician was one of the original faculty of Cooper Medical College, the predecessor to Stanford University School of Medicine.

== Early life and Civil War ==
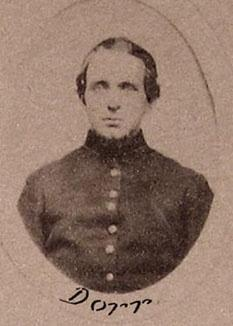
Dorr in the Civil War

Levi Lewis Dorr was born in Brockton, Massachusetts (known at the time as North Bridgewater) in 1840 to Rufus and Eliza (née Perkins) Dorr as the 4th of their nine children. He and the family lived in Duxbury, MA for the majority of his childhood. As a teen he worked for his father who was a blacksmith. He appeared on the crew list as a cabin boy for the Bark Wyman in 1959 bound for Brazil. The ship departed from the port of Salem on February 16 and returned June 2, 1859, making two stops in the states of Pará and Maranhão of Brazil. The exact mission of this trip is unknown.

By 1861, Dorr was working in Massachusetts as a clerk when the Civil War broke out. He quickly enlisted as a private in the 13th Regiment of Massachusetts Volunteers, Company B. During his period of service he most notably fought in the Battle of Antietam in September 1862. He was severely wounded in the leg which forced him to leave from active combat. He later wrote he was glad to have fought in the battle, despite the injury, due to its significance in the war, writing the battle was “probably next to Gettysburg in its immediate importance.”

I am glad I was in [the Battle of Antietam], if it did disable me for further duty at the front. The Hospital surgeons said they would give thousands of dollars if they had my wound obtained under the same circumstances. They could probably have had one or more by being at the front a while. It is said to be a fact that there were more surgeons killed and wounded in proportion to the number serving than any other corps of the army. ~ L. L. Dorr, Sept. 6th 1920

After the injury, he was moved to the Invalid Corps and was sent to the Douglas Army Hospital in Washington, D.C., to serve as a nurse. It was here that he first gained experience in the medical field. He began taking classes at Georgetown University in 1864, apparently introduced to this opportunity by the Hospital Steward George Hanawalt who was enrolled there. Dorr was transferred to the Veteran Reserve Corps on March 28, 1864. He later moved to New York and completed a medical degree at Bellevue Hospital Medical College in 1866.

== Medical career ==
Dorr moved out to San Francisco, California, after attaining his degree, and in 1867 signed a contract to be an acting assistant surgeon for the Department of California. From June 1867 through February 1870, Dorr was sent to the Arizona territory to be a field surgeon for the army, serving at various camps including Crittenden, Wallen, Bowie, and Grant. He was paid $125 per month for this service (~$2,000 today based on CPI inflation). Dorr wrote to a friend in late 1869 that he was tiring of this activity, “Do not like field service as I have been on it so much during the last year and but little time to study. Next spring will try and leave the army.” He returned to San Francisco at the end of this time, before serving at Camp Warner in Oregon during two separate periods between May 1870 and June 1872. After Oregon he left military service, starting a private medical practice in San Francisco and marrying Jeannette Raymond on April 3, 1873.

In 1858, Dr. Elias Samuel Cooper founded the medical department of the University of the Pacific. Dr. L. L. Dorr was appointed here as temporary professor of materia medica and Therapeutics in 1876 and until 1877, replacing Professor Prevost after his unexpected death. On 9 May 1881 Dr. Dorr was formally elected to this position. In the interim, Dorr held the position of coroner for the City and County of San Francisco from December 3, 1877, until at least mid-1880. In 1882, the Medical Department was transformed into a new institution, the Cooper Medical College; Dr. Dorr was appointed to its original faculty on November 2, 1882, as Professor of Materia Medica and Therapeutics. This college was the direct predecessor to Stanford University's School of Medicine.

Levi and Jeannette (later spelled Janet or Janett) Dorr had five children, four surviving childhood. The first, William R, was born in 1874, Jesse (or Jessey) in 1877, Louis 1880, and Elsie in 1883. Dr. Dorr remained active in local politics and veteran associations over the years, including the 13th Regiment Association. He was in part responsible for the establishment of the National Cemetery for soldiers in San Francisco where he is buried. At the 1900 census, a Johanna Eagan was living with the family as a servant, she was a 29-year-old irish immigrant who had entered the country two years prior.

== 1906 earthquake ==
Dorr survived the earthquake and subsequent fire that ravaged San Francisco in 1906. He lost his home at 1115 Hyde Street, his residence since at least 1892, along with most of his possessions. He wrote in a letter to his comrades of this event:

Well, I am alive and doing; but had a hard rub on April 18th and 19th. The 'quake was more severe than it is discreet to confess. Most of the evidences of severity were burned the next three days. I lost my office and contents, my house and all contents but silver and some clothing. Small insurance and getting only seventy per cent of that from a company well able to pay. Every association I had was destroyed; clubs, societys, [sic] orders, church, and patients scattered to the many corners of the world. I was a little groggy for a while, and ate refugee bread for a few days, but am still in the ring. The city is building slowly on account of the defaulting insurance companies, but is bound to be a better appearing town in time. What time no one knows. Our half developed country, our magnificent harbor and the gorgeous Pacific are at last attracting railroad and eastern capitalists.

After the earthquake, Dorr moved to 2678 Filbert Street where he stayed for most of his later years, continuing work as a private physician. His final residence was at Garden Nursing Home where he died on September 10, 1934. He was buried at the San Francisco National Cemetery with distinction as First Sergeant in the 2nd battalion of the Veteran Reserve Corps.
