= Patrick Condon =

Patrick Condon (born 1950 in Brockton, Massachusetts) is a Canadian politician, landscape architect, and professor.

== Education ==
Condon has a BSc and MLA from the University of Massachusetts Amherst. He has worked as a community organizer in Brockton, Massachusetts and a landscape architect.

== Academic career ==
In 1985, he started a tenure-track position in the Department of Landscape Architecture at the University of Minnesota, Twin Cities. He was granted tenure at that University in 1990.

In 1992 he moved to Canada, taking a position as Chair of the UBC Landscape Architecture Program University of British Columbia. In 1996 he assumed the UBC Chair in Landscape and Livable Environments, a position he still holds. He was promoted to full professor by UBC in 2006 and currently teaches in the Master of Urban Design Program.

== Political career ==
In June 2018, Condon sought the nomination for Coalition of Progressive Electors in the Vancouver mayoral elections. As mayor, Condon proposed to increase taxes on homeowners and developers in Vancouver in order to raise enough funds to build enough non-market housing so that it would be half of the city's housing stock. Condon said that tax hikes on developers would not lead to higher house prices. He withdrew in July 2018 after suffering a stroke in Massachusetts.

He authored the 2024 book Broken City: Land Speculation, Inequality, and Urban Crisis. While promoting the book, Condon has argued that upzoning leads to higher housing costs by inflating land costs and inviting speculative investment which real estate investors then pass on to renters by raising rents. Condon's research contradicts research by most economists who conclude that increases in housing supply lead to reductions in housing costs.

== Books ==
Condon is the author of books including

- Design Charrettes for Sustainable Communities (Island Press, 2007)
- Seven Rules for Sustainable Communities (Island Press, 2010)
- Five Rules for Tomorrow's Cities; Design in an age of Urban Migration, Demographic Change, and a Disappearing Middle Class (Island Press, 2020)
- Broken City: Land Speculation, Inequality, and Urban Crisis (UBC Press, 2024)
