= Brockton Airport =

- IATA: none; ICAO: none

Summary
- Operator: Private
- Location: Brockton, Massachusetts
- Built: Unknown
- In use: 1920s-Before 1959
- Occupants: Private
- Elevation AMSL: 70 ft / 21 m
- Coordinates: 42°2′46.13″N 71°0′49.96″W
- Interactive map of Brockton Airport

Brockton Airport was an airfield operational in the mid-20th century in Brockton, Massachusetts.
