= Old Post Office Building (Brockton, Massachusetts) =

- U.S. National Register of Historic Places
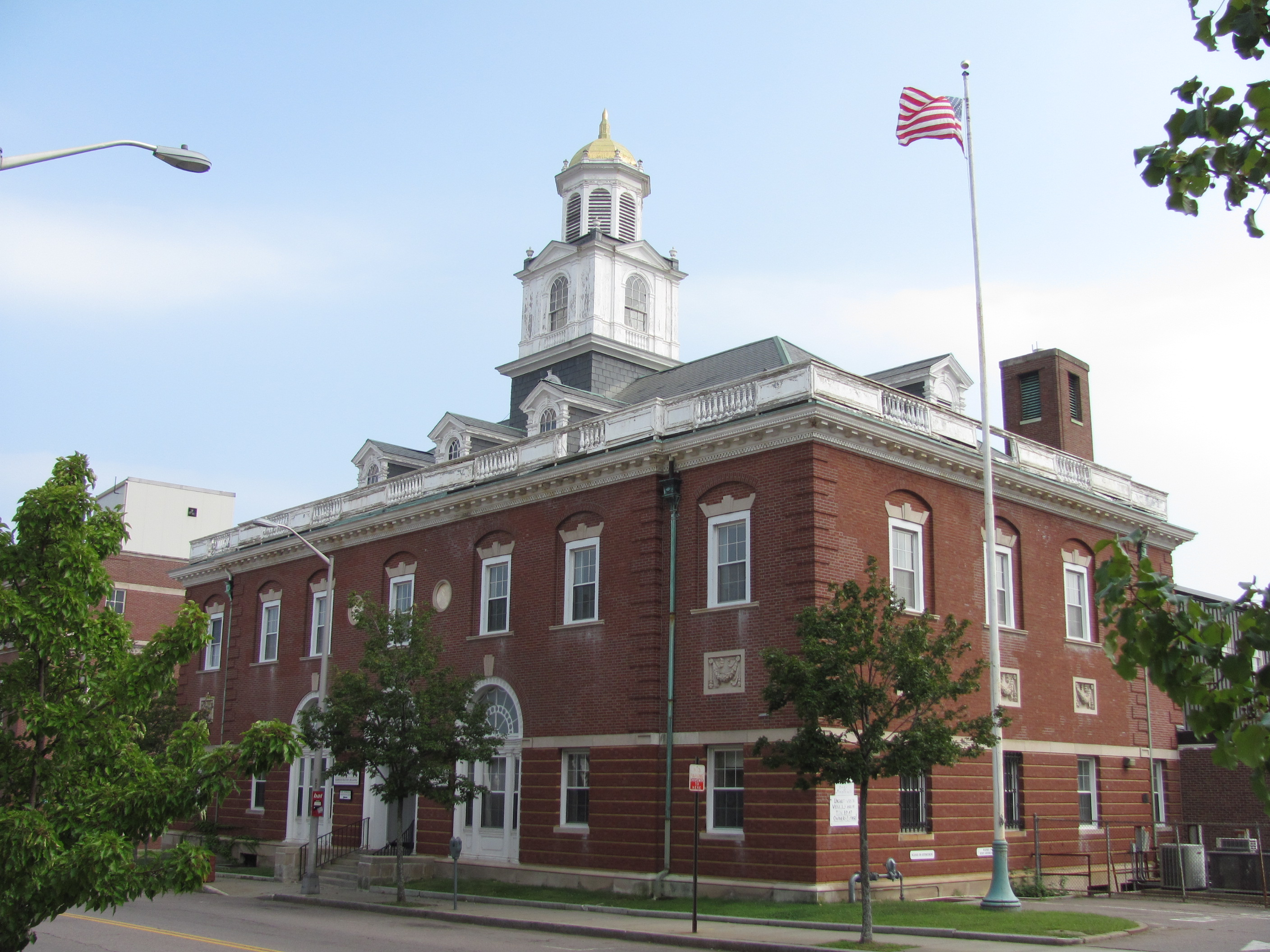
- Old Post Office Building

- Location within Massachusetts Location within the United States
- Location: 43 Crescent St., Brockton, Massachusetts
- Coordinates: 42°4′51″N 71°1′10″W
- Built: 1898
- Architect: James Knox Taylor
- Architectural style: Colonial Revival
- NRHP reference No.: 78000474
- Added to NRHP: March 8, 1978

The Old Post Office Building is a historic building in Brockton, Massachusetts. The two story brick Colonial Revival-style post office was built in 1898 and expanded in 1932. It was designed under the auspices of the federal government's supervising architect, James Knox Taylor, as a copy of Independence Hall in Philadelphia. The building was renovated in 1977 and became home of the Brockton Public Schools central administration offices.

The building was added to the National Register of Historic Places in 1978.

== See also ==
- Brockton City Hall
- National Register of Historic Places listings in Plymouth County, Massachusetts
- List of United States post offices
