= South Street Historic District (Brockton, Massachusetts) =

Historic district in Massachusetts, United States

- U.S. National Register of Historic Places
- U.S. Historic district
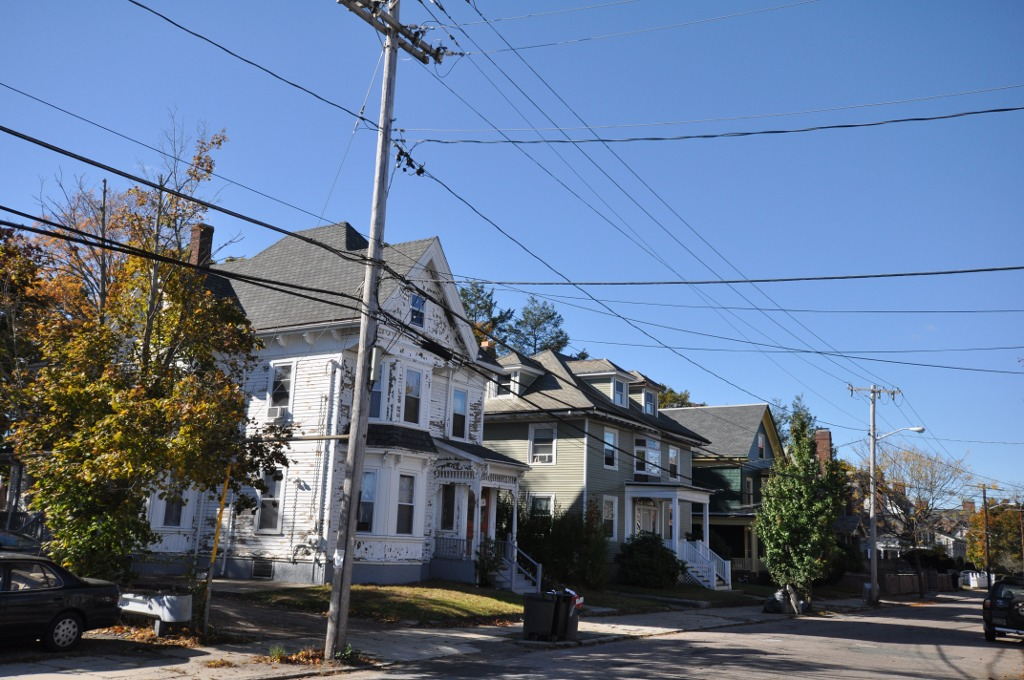
- The south side of South Street

- Location within Massachusetts Location within the United States
- Location: Brockton, Massachusetts
- Coordinates: 42°3′47″N 71°1′11″W
- Architect: Multiple
- Architectural style: Late 19th and 20th Century Revivals, Late Victorian
- NRHP reference No.: 83004096
- Added to NRHP: October 6, 1983

The South Street Historic District is a historic district on South Street from Main Street to Warren Avenue in Brockton, Massachusetts. South Street was a fashionable residential address from about 1850 to 1915, and includes a cross-section of residential architectural styles, with the Colonial Revival predominating. The district includes two church buildings: the South Congregational Church, built in 1854 and demolished in the early 1990s to make way for a Walgreens pharmacy, and the South Street Methodist Church, an 1880 building which has been converted to residential use.

The district was added to the National Register of Historic Places in 1983.

== See also ==
- National Register of Historic Places listings in Plymouth County, Massachusetts
