= Howard Block (Brockton, Massachusetts) =

- U.S. National Register of Historic Places
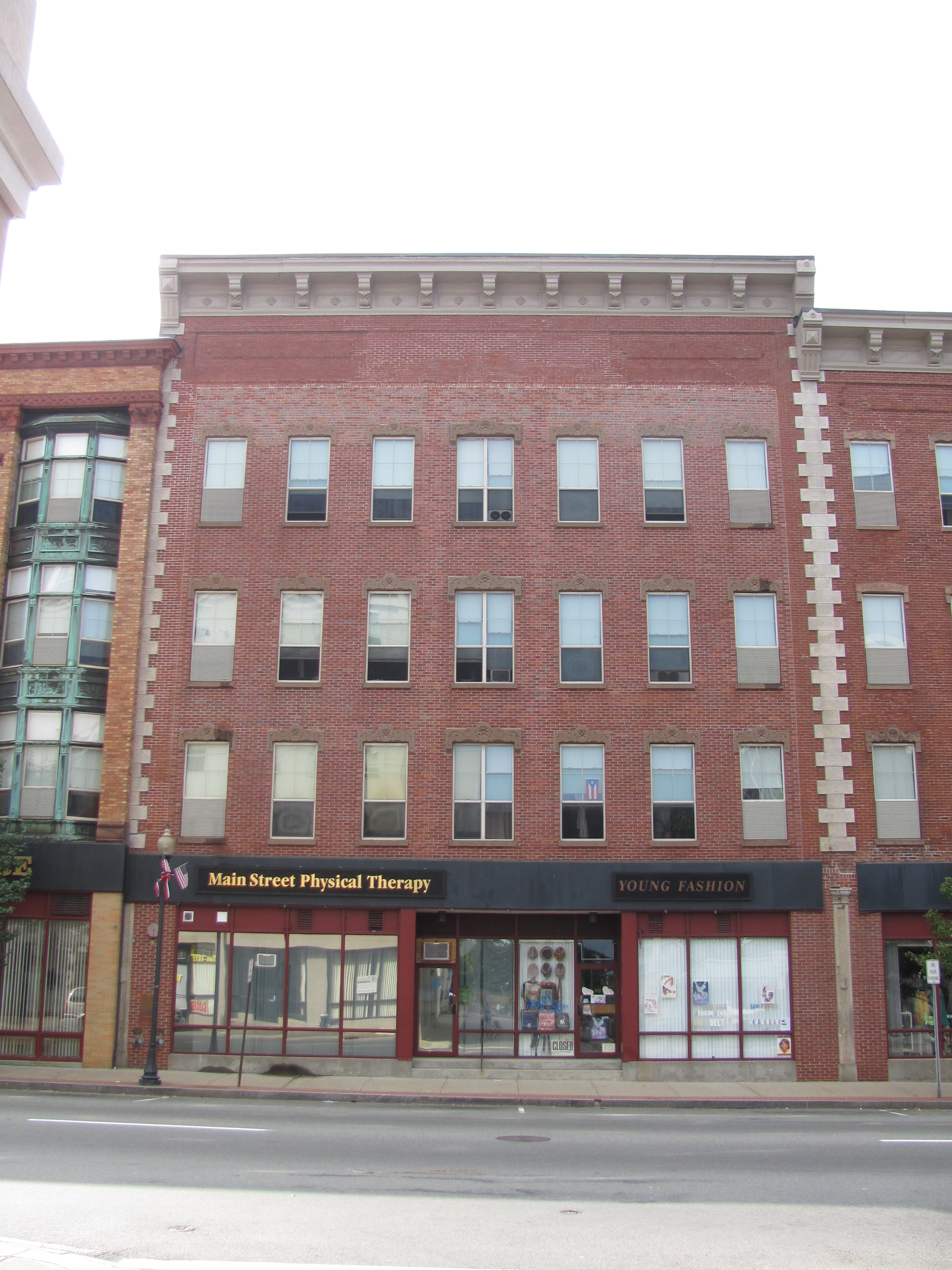
- Howard Block

- Location within Massachusetts Location within the United States
- Location: 93–97 Main St., Brockton, Massachusetts
- Coordinates: 42°5′0″N 71°1′15″W
- Area: less than one acre
- Built: 1876
- NRHP reference No.: 82004969
- Added to NRHP: April 15, 1982

The Howard Block is a historic commercial building at 93–97 Main Street in Brockton, Massachusetts. Built in 1876, it forms (along with the adjacent Lyman Block), an important nexus of commercial development of the post-Civil War era in Brockton. The block listed on the National Register of Historic Places in 1982.

== Description and history ==
The Howard Block is located in downtown Brockton, across Main Street from City Hall, and immediately adjacent to the similar Lyman Block. It is a four-story structure, built out of load-bearing brick and covered by a flat roof. It has granite corner quoining, and brownstone window lintels with keystones and shoulders. The main facade is crowned by a bracketed cornice. Most of the windows are sash, with doubled windows in the center bay.

The block was built in 1876, during a period of prosperity driven by the success of Brockton's shoe industry in the years after the American Civil War. It was built by the owners of Howard, Clark & Co., a manufacturer of furniture and funerary caskets. The same owners also built the Lyman Block in the same year, and it is in that building where they located their business, while this edifice was built as a speculative venture and leased to other businesses. The building is named for a member of one of Brockton's oldest families, and originally housed facilities for the local chapter of the International Order of Odd Fellows on the top floor. At some point in the early 20th century, the central bays were of the main facade were removed and replaced by a glass curtain wall; this change was reversed to some degree in when the building was adapted for senior housing in 1979.

== See also ==
- Goldthwaite Block, next door
- National Register of Historic Places listings in Plymouth County, Massachusetts
