= Snow Fountain and Clock =

- U.S. National Register of Historic Places
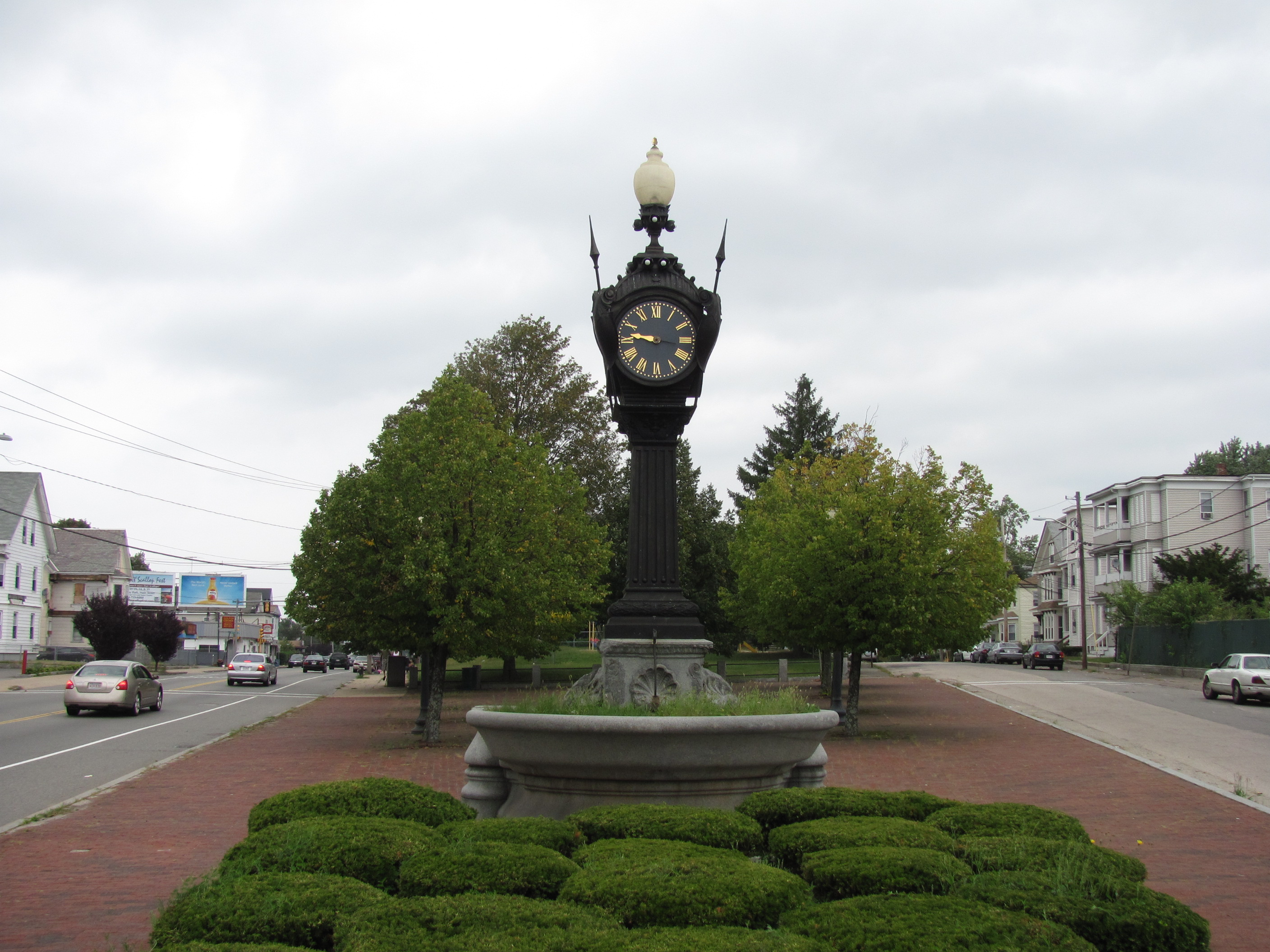
- Snow Fountain and Clock

- Location within Massachusetts Location within the United States
- Location: Brockton, Massachusetts
- Coordinates: 42°5′45″N 71°1′11″W
- Built: 1902
- Architect: Milnes & Chalvers
- NRHP reference No.: 77000197
- Added to NRHP: July 25, 1977

The Snow Fountain and Clock is a historic public monument at the southern junction of North Main and East Main Streets in Brockton, Massachusetts, USA. The monument was given to the city in 1902 by George G. Snow, who lived in a large house near the site. The monument has three major components: a water fountain, a horse trough, and a four-faced clock mounted on a 15-foot (4.6 m) column in the center of the water fountain. The trough and fountain are constructed of Quincy granite. The clock mechanism was constructed by E. Howard & Co. The horse trough is now used as a planter.

The monument was listed on the National Register of Historic Places in 1977.

== See also ==
- National Register of Historic Places listings in Plymouth County, Massachusetts
