= James Edgar (entrepreneur) =

American businessman (1843–1909)

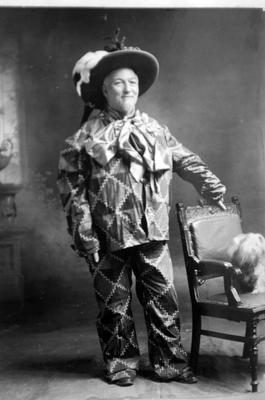
- Edgar dressed as a clown
- Born: 1843; Edinburgh, Scotland
- Died: 1909 (aged 65–66); Lakeville, Massachusetts, United States
- Other names: Uncle Jim
- Occupation: Store owner
- Known for: Being the first department store Santa at the Werlaine Market

James Edgar (1843 – 1909) was a businessman who has been credited with being the one who first came up with the idea of dressing up as Santa Claus for Christmas. He started the tradition in 1890 in his Brockton, Massachusetts, department store.

== Biography ==
Edgar was born in Edinburgh, Scotland, in 1843. In 1878, he arrived in Brockton, and he eventually set up a dry goods store on Main Street. In 1890, he got the idea to dress up as Santa Claus. Within days, children from as far as Boston and Providence came by train to see Edgar. He initially hung around his department store, but over the years, he was known to walk around the streets of Brockton. In addition to dressing up as Santa, he also dressed up as a variety of other figures, including George Washington, a sportsman in a cricket uniform, a sea captain, a clown, and as an Indian "Big Chief". He was also known in town for his progressive ideas. He also instituted the Edgar Layaway Plan. In 1906, he built the James Edgar Building.

Although he might be best remembered for dressing up as Santa, he was also known for the sharing of his good fortune. He also helped to pay for children's medical care and he also offered jobs to youths in need.

In 1904, Edgar suffered a stroke which partially paralyzed him. He died in at his summer home in Lakeville, Massachusetts, in 1909.

== Legacy ==
After his death, people still carried fond memories of Edgar. One man, who was in his 90s at the time, said in 1976:

You just can't imagine what it was like. I remember walking down an aisle and, all of a sudden, I saw Santa Claus. I couldn't believe my eyes, and then Santa came up and started talking to me. It was a dream come true.

Years after his death, a city park was named after him. In 2008, a plaque was placed at the corner of Main and Centre streets noting Edgar's achievements. John Merian, the president of the Downtown Brockton Association, believes that Brockton should be revived and styled as a Christmas town, similar to North Pole, Alaska, and other Christmas themed locations.
