= D.W. Field Park =

- D. W. Field Park
- U.S. National Register of Historic Places
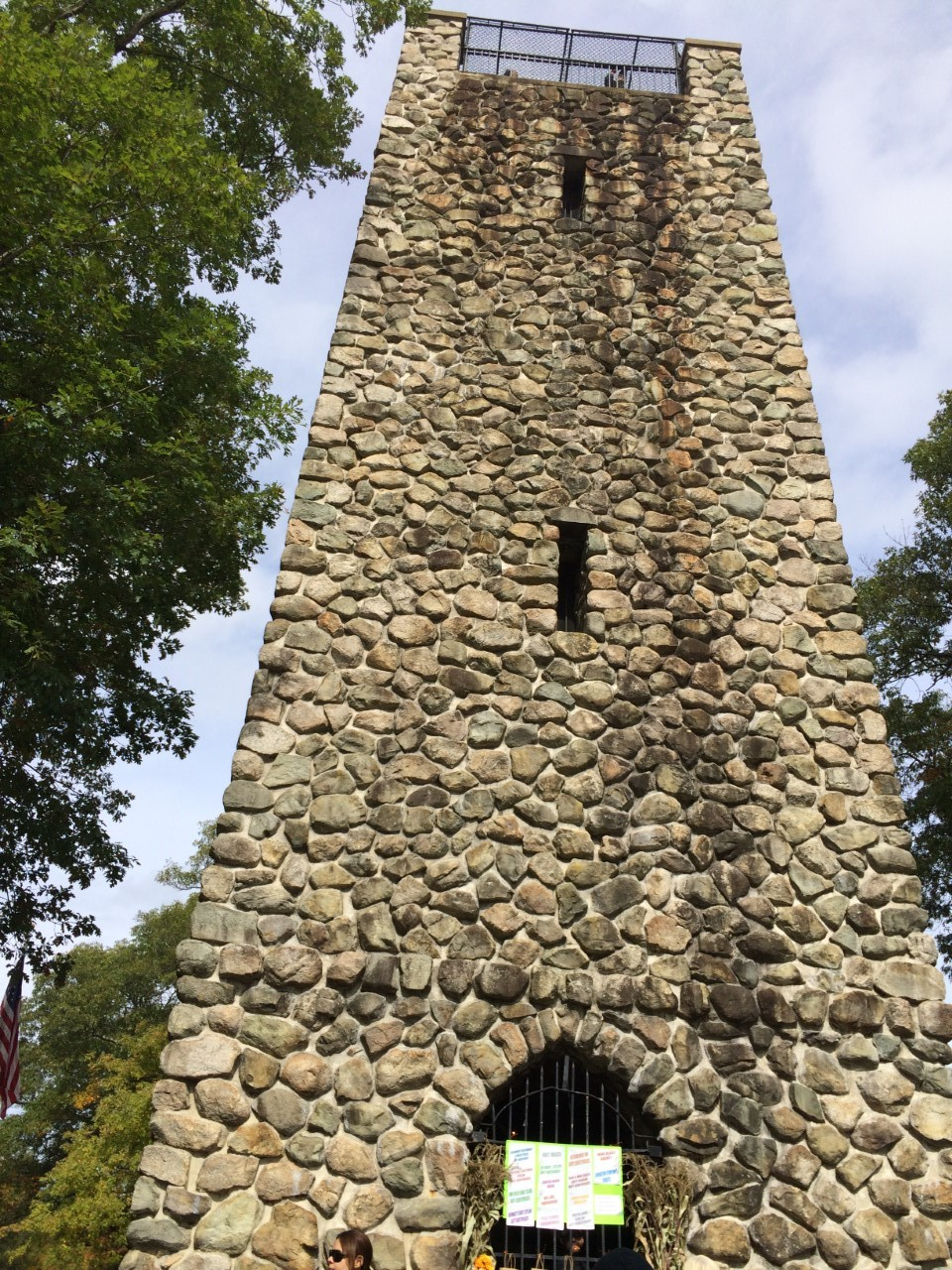
- DW Field Park tower side view on Towerfest Day

- Location within Massachusetts Location within the United States
- Location: Avon and Brockton, Massachusetts
- Coordinates: 42°6′17″N 71°2′47″W
- Area: 650 acres (260 ha)
- Architect: Negus and Punchard; Field, Daniel W.
- NRHP reference No.: 00001341
- Added to NRHP: November 24, 2000

D.W. Field Park is a municipal park managed by the parks department of the city of Brockton, Massachusetts. The park consists of 650 acres (260 ha) of fields, woodlands, and water bodies in northern Brockton and southern Avon, Massachusetts. It was created in 1925 as a bequest from Brockton businessman Daniel W. Field. Its landscape is dominated by a chain of seven water bodies, all but one of which are man-made, impounding Beaver Brook. The oldest of them, Cross Pond, was created in the 1790s; these lakes, ponds, and reservoirs, were, with one exception, created before the park was laid out, and served either agricultural or industrial purposes. Waldo Lake was created in the 1930s as part of the park's design.

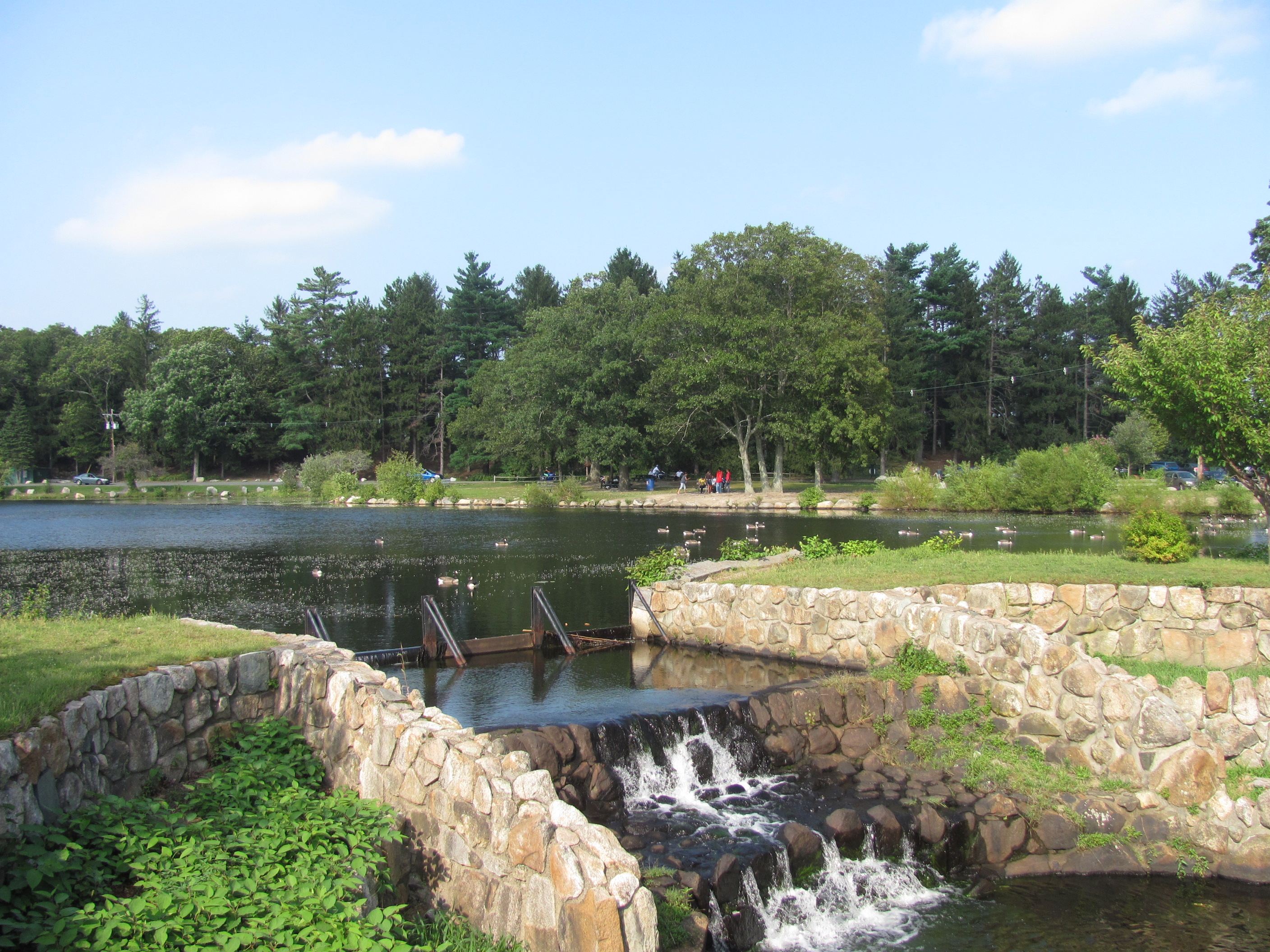
Upper Porter Pond

Access to the park's interior is via a narrow road 6 miles (9.7 km) long that winds through the grounds, providing access to its major features. This circuit road is accessible from the surrounding public roadways at a number of points, with gates built from locally gathered fieldstone. There is no formalized network of pedestrian paths. As a result, activities tend to be concentrated at the places where there are parking facilities, resulting in some environmental and scenic degradation.

The park's most prominent landmark is a fieldstone observation tower, built at the park's high point, known as Indian Cave Hill or Tower Hill. It was built in 1928 from fieldstones gathered from the park grounds. Inside 90 steps, approximately 18 per landing, lead to an observation deck with a visage as far as Blue Hills in all directions. The park is open everyday dawn til dusk; the tower is officially open 1 day a year during Towerfest, early October, Columbus Day weekend.

At the foot of Tower Hill is a concrete pad, in which are embedded Daniel Field's handprints and footprints, and the inscription "Please Enjoy, Do Not Destroy D.W. Field Park." The other major structure in the park is the gatehouse of the Brockton Reservoir, which was built in the 1880s. The park also includes an eighteen-hole golf course.

The park was listed on the National Register of Historic Places in 2000.

== See also ==
- National Register of Historic Places listings in Plymouth County, Massachusetts
- National Register of Historic Places listings in Norfolk County, Massachusetts
