= Boston Medical Center – South =

Hospital in Brockton, Massachusetts

- BMC Health System

Geography
- Location: 235 North Pearl Street, Brockton, Massachusetts, United States
- Coordinates: 42.097731°N 71.062564°W

Organization
- Care system: Private
- Funding: Non-profit hospital
- Type: Acute-Care

Services
- Standards: Joint Commission
- Emergency department: Level III trauma center
- Beds: 237: 4, 14,

History
- Former names: Cardinal Cushing General Hospital; Gordon Memorial Hospital; Good Samaritan Medical Center
- Opened: 1968

Links
- Website: www.bmchealthsystem.org/bmc-south
- Lists: Hospitals in Massachusetts

Boston Medical Center – South (BMC South) (formerly Good Samaritan Medical Center) is a mid-size non-profit acute-care hospital located in Brockton, Massachusetts with auxiliary facilities in the neighboring town of Stoughton. BMC South is a part of Boston Medical Center Health System, a non-profit health care system which took over the hospital in 2024 from Steward Health Care, its previous operator, which was forced to sell its Massachusetts hospitals following its bankruptcy.

== History ==
The Archdiocese of Boston, under the direction of Cardinal Richard Cushing, founded the Cardinal Cushing General Hospital in 1968. The 35 acre complex was opened on Sunday January 14, 1968. At its opening the $12 million dollar facility had 275 beds and included a surgical suite, a pediatric department, and a psychiatric ward. Cushing proclaimed "this hospital will not be interested in making money ... our interest is in helping the sick and paying our expenses."

In 1986 Cardinal Cushing Hospital, along with St. Elizabeth Hospital, St. John of God Hospital, and St. Margaret's Hospital for Women, founded the Caritas Christi healthcare group, moving administration away from the arch-diocese directly.

In 1993 Cardinal Cushing Hospital president Robert J. Jepson Jr. announced merged with nearby Goddard Memorial Hospital in Stoughton. The new combined hospital was named Good Samaritan.

A 1994 boiler room fire caused some damage to the Cardinal Cushing campus of the hospital. All 114 patients were successfully evacuated.

In 2010 Good Samaritan Hospital was converted into a for-profit hospital after Caritas Christi sold its six Massachusetts hospitals, including Good Samaritan, to Cerberus Capital Management. Good Samaritan was a founding member of the Steward Health Care System.

On May 5, 2024, The Wall Street Journal announced Steward Health Care was expected to file for imminent Chapter 11 bankruptcy protection, blaming rising costs, insufficient revenue and cash crunches as part of the decision.

On August 30, 2024 the non-profit Boston Medical Center announced it would purchase Good Samaritan Medical Center as well as St. Elizabeth's in Brighton. On October 1, 2024, BMC Health System officially took over the hospital from Steward. Due to the separation of the hospital from Steward's previous arrangements with the Archdiocese, BMC was required to remove all Catholic references from the hospital, including changing its name. On May 1, 2025, the system announced that the hospital would be renamed Boston Medical Center – South.

== Operations ==
BMC South is licensed for 237 beds. The hospital has a level III Adult trauma center. The hospital discharged 13,362 in 2022 accounting for 1.8% percent of Massachusetts' total discharges. In that year the hospital also reported emergency room visits of 51,269 and total revenues of $311.2 million.
