= Brockton, Massachusetts =

City in Massachusetts, United States

- City
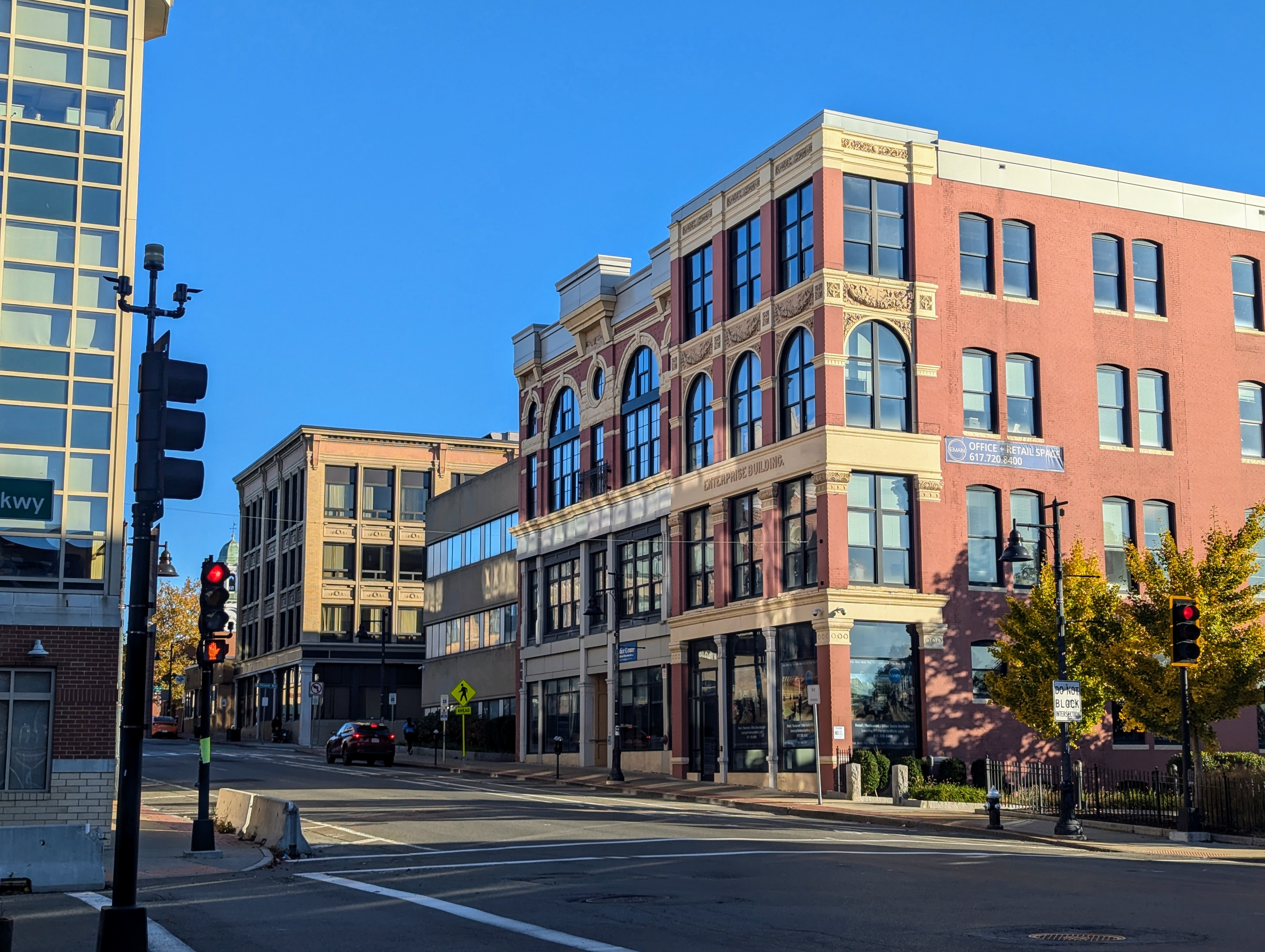
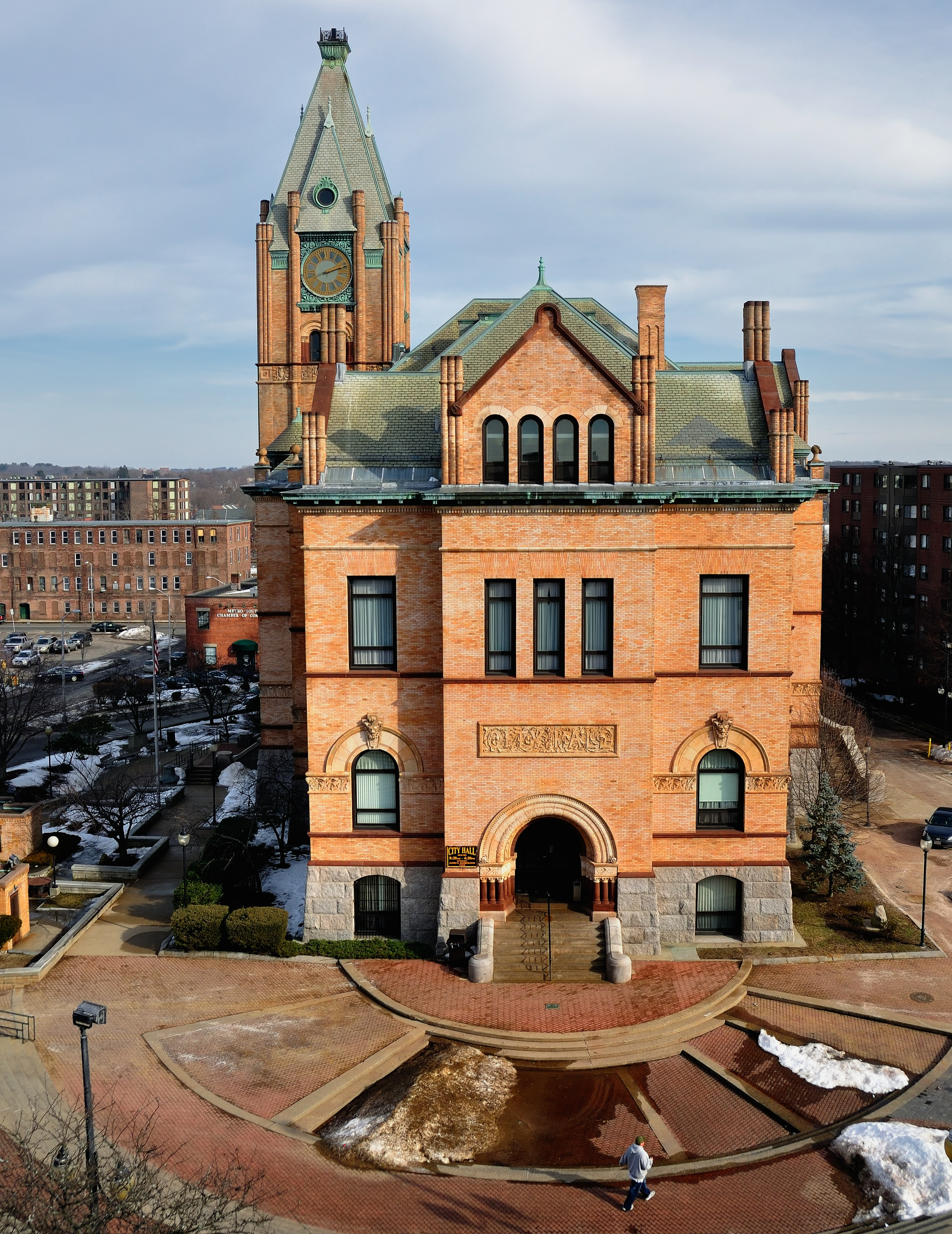
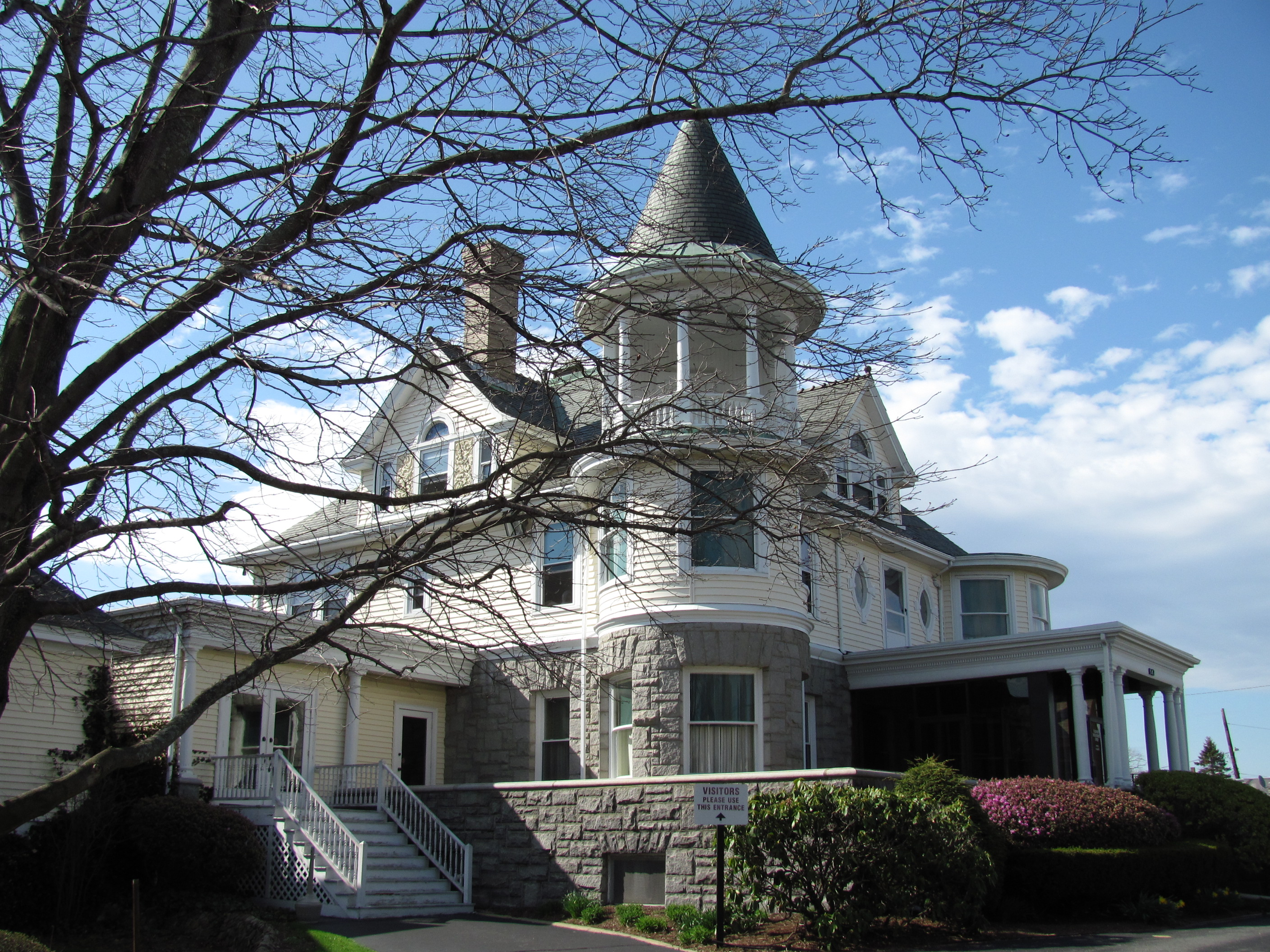
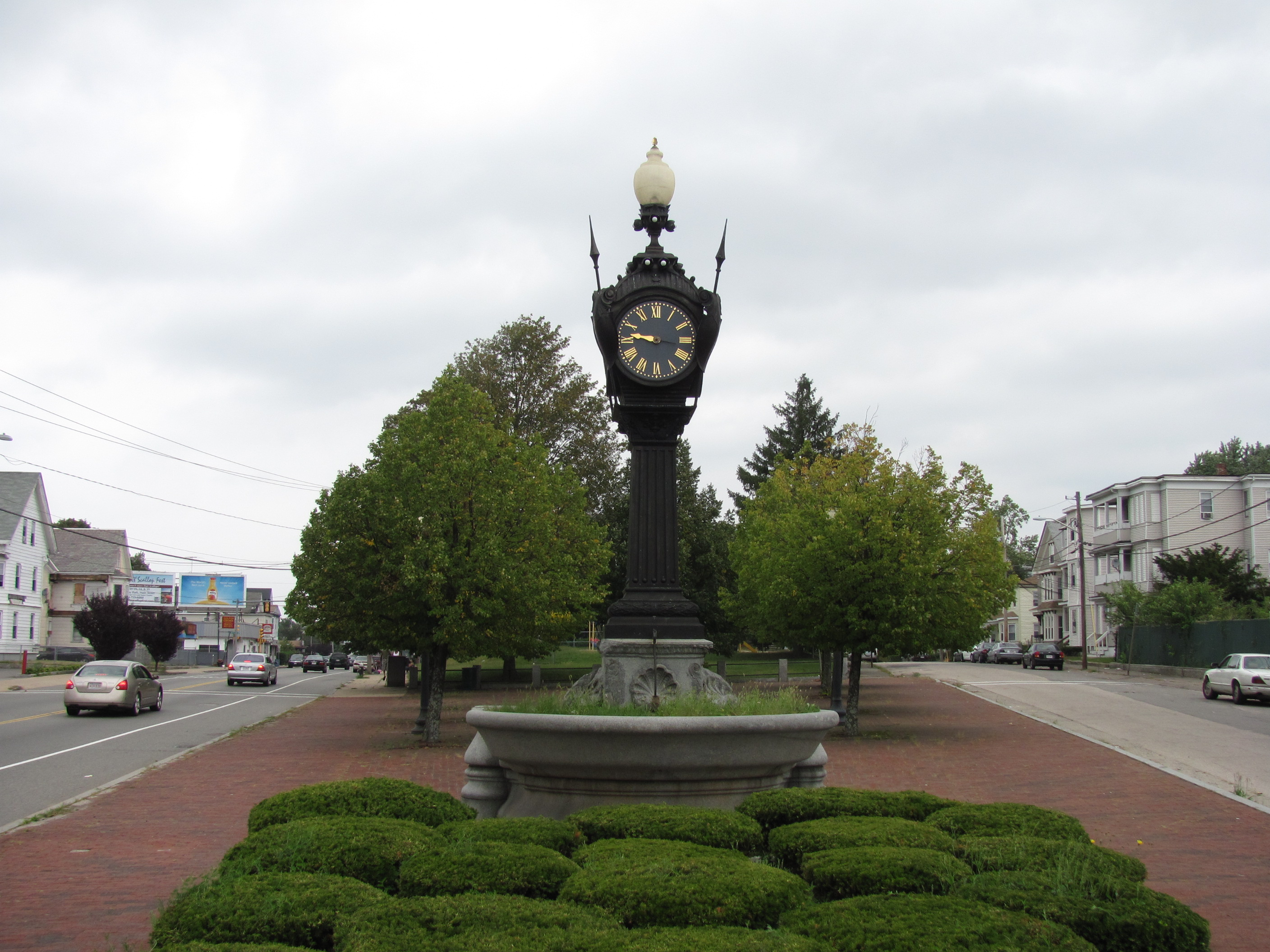
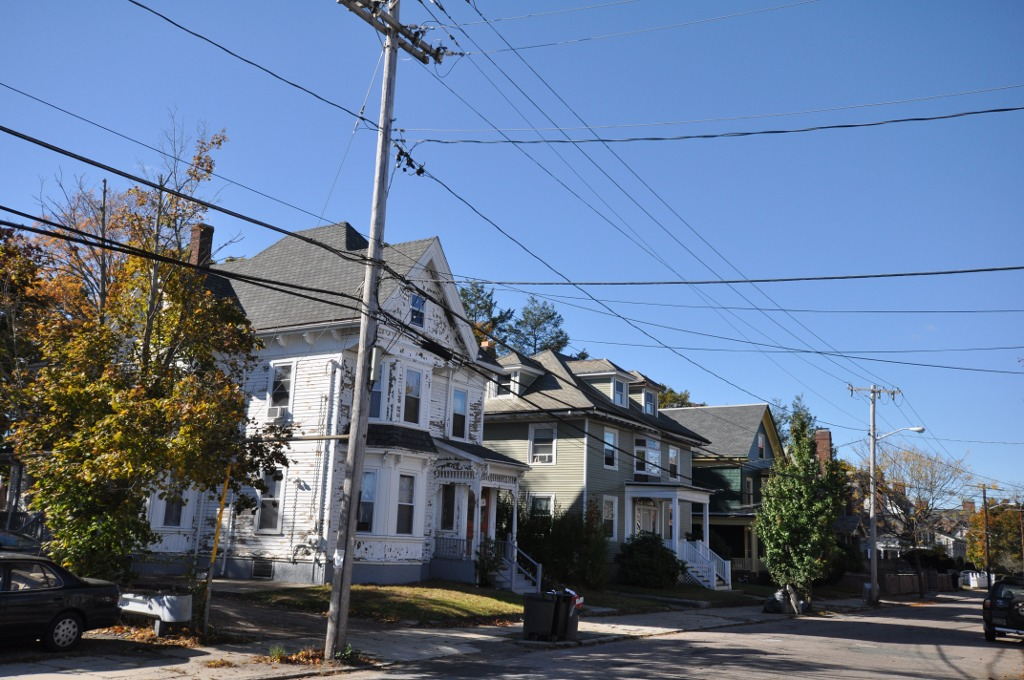
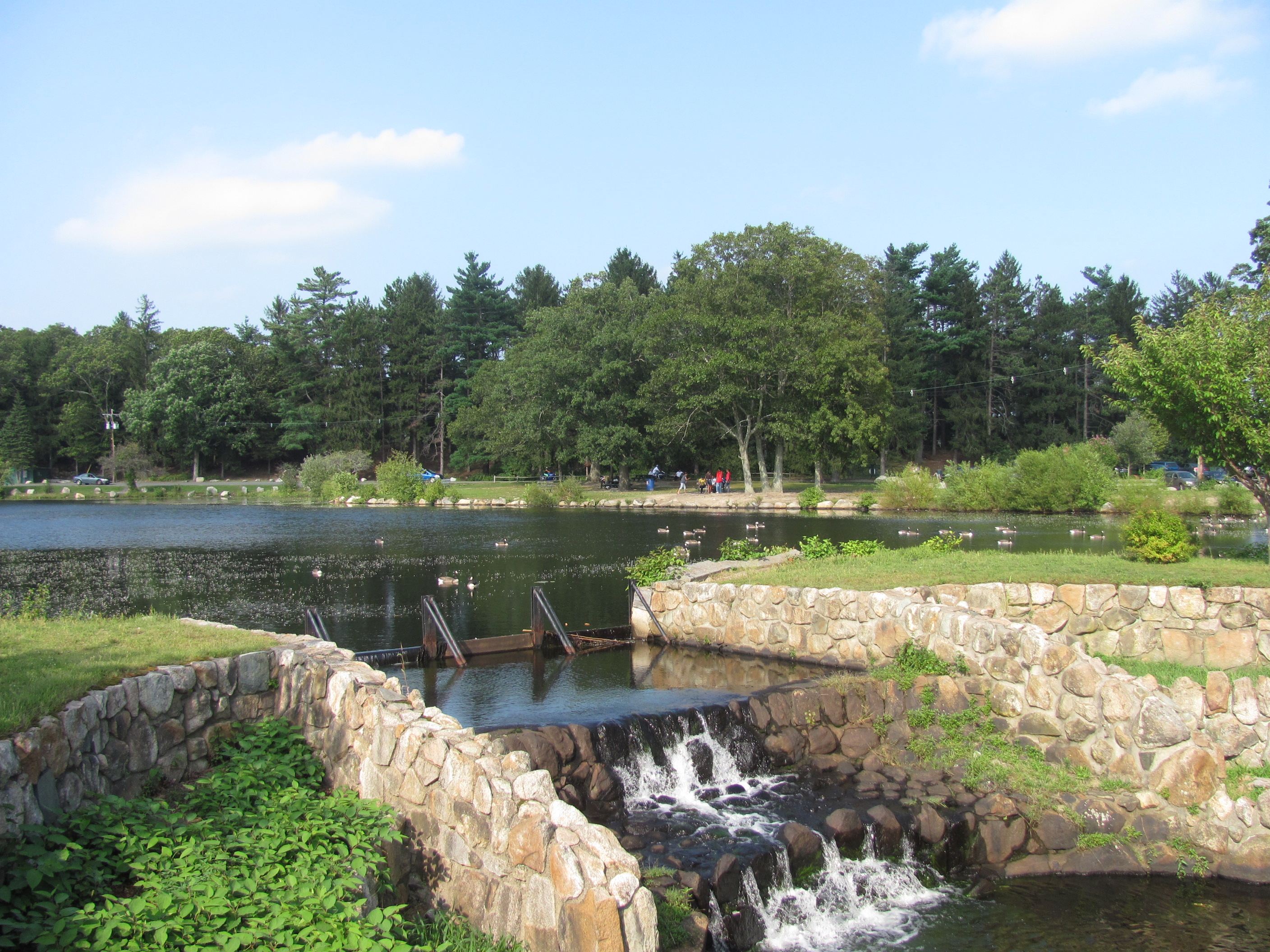
- Downtown Brockton Main Street intersection in Downtown Brockton Brockton City Hall South Street Historic District Snow Fountain and Clock South Street Historic District D.W. Field Park

- Seal
- Nickname: The City of Champions
- Motto: "Education, Industry, Progress"
- Location in Plymouth County in Massachusetts

- Location within Massachusetts Location within the United States Location within North America
- Coordinates: 42°05′00″N 71°01′08″W
- Country: United States
- State: Massachusetts
- County: Plymouth
- Settled: 1700
- Incorporated (town): 1821
- Incorporated (city): 1881

Government
  - Type: Strong mayor/council
  - Mayor: Moises M. Rodrigues

Area
  - Total: 21.52 sq mi (55.73 km^{2})
  - Land: 21.33 sq mi (55.25 km^{2})
  - Water: 0.19 sq mi (0.48 km^{2})
- Elevation: 112 ft (34 m)

Population (2020)
  - Total: 105,643
  - Density: 4,952.2/sq mi (1,912.05/km^{2})
- Time zone: UTC−5 (Eastern)
  - Summer (DST): UTC−4 (Eastern)
- ZIP Codes: 02301–02305
- Area code: 508/774
- FIPS code: 25-09000
- GNIS feature ID: 0617571
- Website: www.brockton.ma.us

Brockton is a city in Plymouth County, Massachusetts, United States. Its population was 105,643 at the 2020 United States census, and it is a major economic and commercial hub for the southern part of Greater Boston. Along with Plymouth, it is one of the two county seats of the county. It is the sixth-largest city in Massachusetts and is sometimes referred to as the "City of Champions", due to the success of native boxers Rocky Marciano and Marvin Hagler, as well as its successful Brockton High School sports programs. Two villages within it are Montello and Campello, both of which have MBTA Commuter Rail Stations and post offices. Campello is the smallest neighborhood, but also the most populous. Brockton hosts a baseball team, the Brockton Rox of the Frontier League. It is one of the windiest cities in the United States, with wind speeds in the area averaging 14.3 mph (23.0 km/h).

== History ==
In 1649, Ousamequin (Massasoit) sold the surrounding Wampanoag land—then known as Saughtucket—to Myles Standish as an addition to Duxbury. Brockton was part of this area, which the English renamed Bridgewater. On June 15, 1821, a portion of the then Bridgewater Township was established as North Bridgewater.

North Bridgewater was renamed Brockton, Massachusetts, on May 5, 1874, when community leaders wanted to adopt a distinctive new name to reflect the town's growing industrial importance, in order to attract customers and new businesses. When town booster and trolley-car magnate Ira Copeland (inventor and manufacturer; b. November 14, 1831 West Bridgewater) was on a business trip, he heard a Canadian train conductor announce the Brockville, Ontario station. Copeland considered the name Brockton would suit North Bridgewater. Since Brockville is named after Isaac Brock as an exemplar of leadership, bravery and duty, ergo Brockton is indirectly named after him. He was the British commanding general who was killed by an American sniper at Queenston Heights—the second major battle of the War of 1812—where invading American troops retreated in defeat. Brock was a loyalist British military officer of historical significance. Naming the town Brockton was the subject of a town vote, with several other names also offered. The name Brock primarily comes from Old English and Celtic roots, meaning "badger," originally a nickname for someone strong and tenacious like a badger, evolving from Old English brocc and ultimately Proto-Celtic brokkos. It also has Dutch/Flemish origins as a topographic name for a "water meadow" (from broek). Ultimately, "Brockton" received 1081 votes (~72%), renaming the town on May 5, 1874. Brockton officially became a city on April 9, 1881.

Several homes in Brockton were stops on the Underground Railroad, a network of secret routes and safe houses that helped slaves from Southern states escape to freedom in the North and Canada. Famous abolitionist Frederick Douglass spoke to a crowd at the Liberty Tree in Brockton during the pre-Civil War period. During the American Civil War, Brockton was America's largest producer of shoes, and until the latter parts of the 20th century, Brockton had a large shoe and leather products industry.

Since the company's 1898 founding, Brockton has been the headquarters city of office supplies retailer W.B. Mason, itself founded to provide those supplies to the city's shoe industry. The city's economy was once based on the shoe industry, but it has since diversified to include other industries such as healthcare, education, and manufacturing. Brockton has faced a number of challenges, including poverty, crime, and regional and local racial segregation. Despite these challenges, the city has made progress in recent years, particularly in the development of its downtown area, by highlighting its diversity and rich history, and working toward a more welcoming atmosphere for businesses and residents.

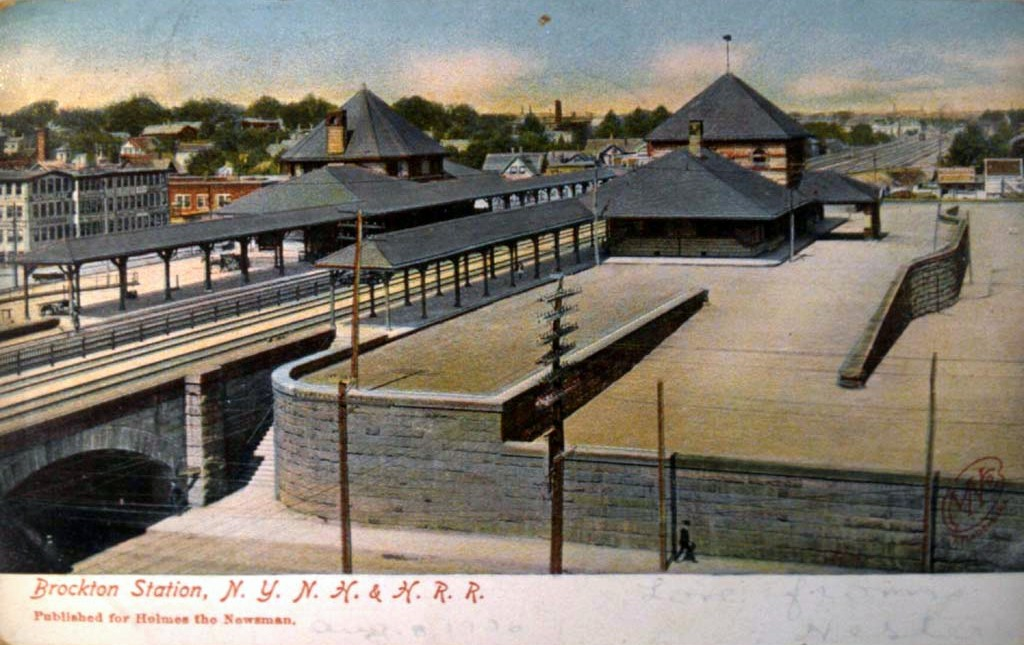
Brockton station on a 1906 postcard

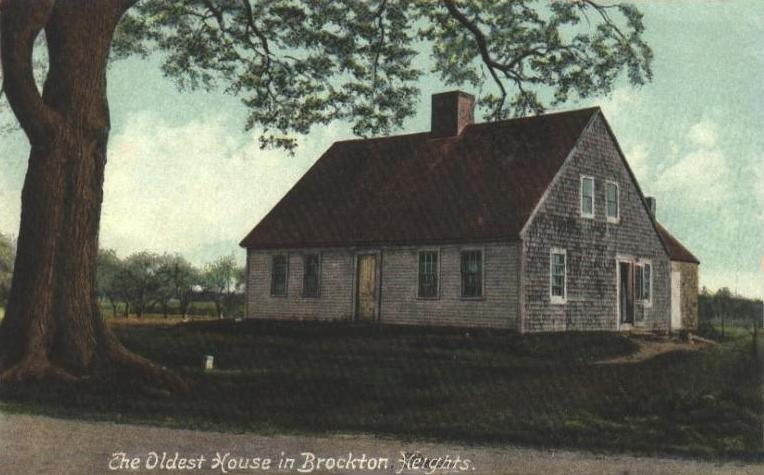
Oldest house in 1910

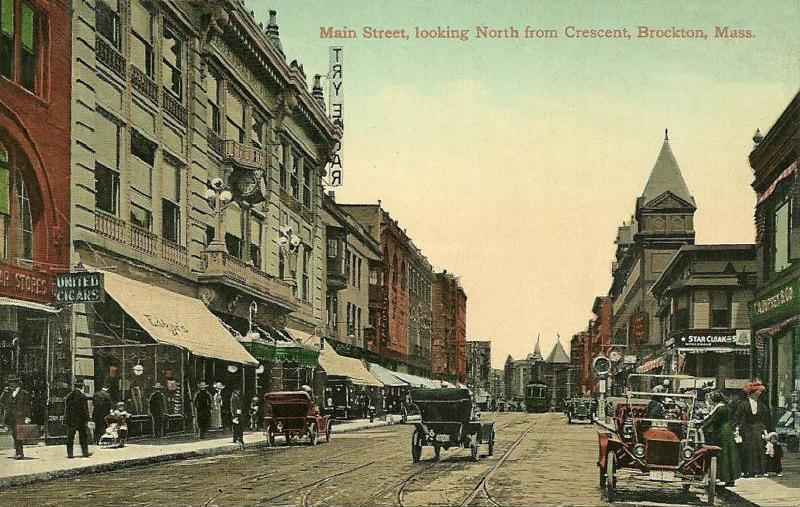
Main Street c. 1910

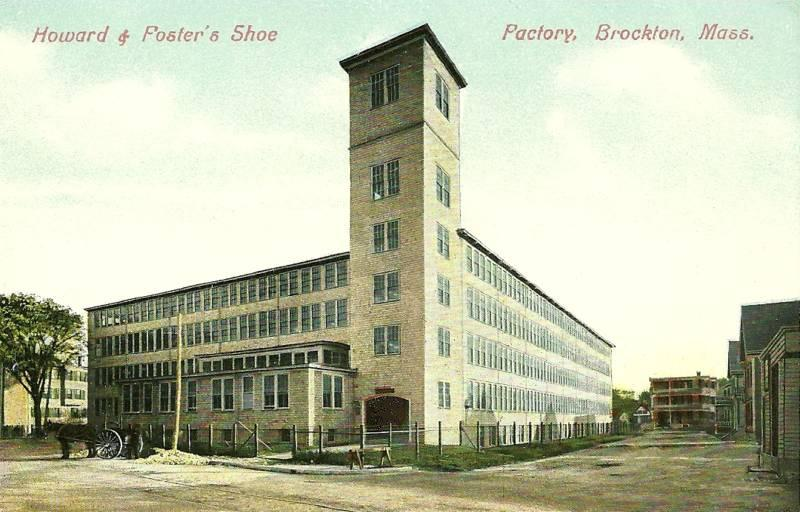
Shoe factory in 1910

=== Historical firsts ===
==== World firsts ====
- On October 1, 1883, Brockton became the first place in the world to have a three-wire underground electrical system when Thomas Edison threw a switch to activate it.
- The City Theater opened on October 24, 1894, the first theater in the world to be tied into the three-wire electrical system.

==== US firsts ====
- On December 30, 1884, the first electrically operated fire station in the United States opened in Brockton.
- The department store Santa Claus appeared in Brockton in December 1890, when James Edgar, of Edgar's Department Store, suited up for the first time.
- Brockton became the first city in the country to abolish grade crossings in 1896.
- In 2020, Brockton became the first city in New England with a majority-Black population.

==== World records ====
- On November 23, 2010, Brockton set the world record for the most Santa Hat wearers in one place at one time, with 872 people participating in the event.
- On November 20, 2011, Brockton doubled the city's Santa Claus hat-wearing record with 1792 people in downtown Brockton wearing Santa hats.

== Geography ==
According to the United States Census Bureau, the city has a total area of 21.6 square miles (56 km^{2}), of which 21.5 square miles (56 km^{2}) is land and 0.1 square miles (0.26 km^{2}) (0.56%) is water. Brockton is the 162nd largest city by land area in the Commonwealth, and the twelfth largest of the twenty-seven towns in Plymouth County. Bordered by Avon to the north, Holbrook to the northeast, Abington to the northeast, Whitman and East Bridgewater to the southeast, West Bridgewater to the south, Easton to the west, and Stoughton to the northwest. Brockton is located 22 miles (35 km) south of Boston, and 30 miles (48 km) northeast of Providence, Rhode Island.

Brockton is mostly an urban setting, lying along the Salisbury Plain River, which once powered the many shoe factories of the city. To the northeast lies the Beaver Brook Conservation Land, attached to the southern end of the Ames Nowell State Park in Abington. There are several parks throughout the city, but the largest is D.W. Field Park, an Olmsted-inspired park which includes ponds, Waldo Lake and Brockton Reservoir in Avon, as well as a golf course.

=== Climate ===
According to the Köppen climate classification, Brockton has either a hot-summer humid continental climate (abbreviated Dfa), or a hot-summer humid subtropical climate (abbreviated Cfa), depending on the isotherm used.

Climate data for Brockton, Massachusetts, 1991–2020 normals, extremes 1894–present
Month	Jan	Feb	Mar	Apr	May	Jun	Jul	Aug	Sep	Oct	Nov	Dec	Year
Record high °F (°C)	71 (22)	72 (22)	88 (31)	95 (35)	97 (36)	105 (41)	103 (39)	104 (40)	100 (38)	90 (32)	83 (28)	78 (26)	105 (41)
Mean maximum °F (°C)	59.7 (15.4)	59.3 (15.2)	67.8 (19.9)	79.9 (26.6)	88.7 (31.5)	92.4 (33.6)	95.1 (35.1)	93.4 (34.1)	88.7 (31.5)	79.9 (26.6)	70.6 (21.4)	62.4 (16.9)	97.0 (36.1)
Mean daily maximum °F (°C)	38.7 (3.7)	40.8 (4.9)	48.0 (8.9)	59.0 (15.0)	69.7 (20.9)	78.3 (25.7)	84.2 (29.0)	82.9 (28.3)	75.3 (24.1)	64.0 (17.8)	53.5 (11.9)	43.7 (6.5)	61.5 (16.4)
Daily mean °F (°C)	29.6 (−1.3)	31.4 (−0.3)	38.3 (3.5)	48.5 (9.2)	58.5 (14.7)	67.7 (19.8)	73.8 (23.2)	72.4 (22.4)	64.8 (18.2)	53.5 (11.9)	43.8 (6.6)	35.0 (1.7)	51.4 (10.8)
Mean daily minimum °F (°C)	20.6 (−6.3)	22.0 (−5.6)	28.7 (−1.8)	38.0 (3.3)	47.4 (8.6)	57.1 (13.9)	63.4 (17.4)	62.0 (16.7)	54.2 (12.3)	43.0 (6.1)	34.2 (1.2)	26.4 (−3.1)	41.4 (5.2)
Mean minimum °F (°C)	0.2 (−17.7)	3.8 (−15.7)	11.2 (−11.6)	25.2 (−3.8)	33.7 (0.9)	43.5 (6.4)	51.4 (10.8)	49.2 (9.6)	38.1 (3.4)	27.6 (−2.4)	18.7 (−7.4)	8.9 (−12.8)	−1.8 (−18.8)
Record low °F (°C)	−18 (−28)	−19 (−28)	−5 (−21)	13 (−11)	25 (−4)	35 (2)	40 (4)	37 (3)	27 (−3)	13 (−11)	3 (−16)	−16 (−27)	−19 (−28)
Average precipitation inches (mm)	4.02 (102)	3.62 (92)	5.23 (133)	4.53 (115)	3.44 (87)	4.13 (105)	3.17 (81)	3.60 (91)	4.08 (104)	4.96 (126)	4.39 (112)	5.06 (129)	50.23 (1,277)
Average snowfall inches (cm)	9.1 (23)	12.8 (33)	6.9 (18)	0.7 (1.8)	0.0 (0.0)	0.0 (0.0)	0.0 (0.0)	0.0 (0.0)	0.0 (0.0)	0.1 (0.25)	0.2 (0.51)	4.5 (11)	34.3 (87.56)
Average extreme snow depth inches (cm)	9.3 (24)	8.2 (21)	5.4 (14)	1.0 (2.5)	0.0 (0.0)	0.0 (0.0)	0.0 (0.0)	0.0 (0.0)	0.0 (0.0)	0.0 (0.0)	0.3 (0.76)	5.0 (13)	15.4 (39)
Average precipitation days (≥ 0.01 in)	11.0	10.7	12.0	12.3	12.8	11.4	9.7	9.3	9.4	11.4	11.0	12.3	133.3
Average snowy days (≥ 0.1 in)	2.2	2.3	1.5	0.2	0.0	0.0	0.0	0.0	0.0	0.0	0.1	1.4	7.7
Source 1: NOAA
Source 2: National Weather Service

== Demographics ==
Historical population
Year	Pop.	±%
1830	1,953	—
1840	2,616	+33.9%
1850	3,939	+50.6%
1860	6,584	+67.1%
1870	8,007	+21.6%
1880	13,608	+70.0%
1890	27,294	+100.6%
1900	40,063	+46.8%
1910	56,878	+42.0%
1920	66,254	+16.5%
1930	63,797	−3.7%
1940	62,343	−2.3%
1950	62,860	+0.8%
1960	72,813	+15.8%
1970	89,040	+22.3%
1980	95,172	+6.9%
1990	92,788	−2.5%
2000	94,304	+1.6%
2010	93,810	−0.5%
2020	105,643	+12.6%
2024*	105,788	+0.1%
* = population estimate. Source: United States census records and Population Estimates Program data. Source: U.S. Decennial Census

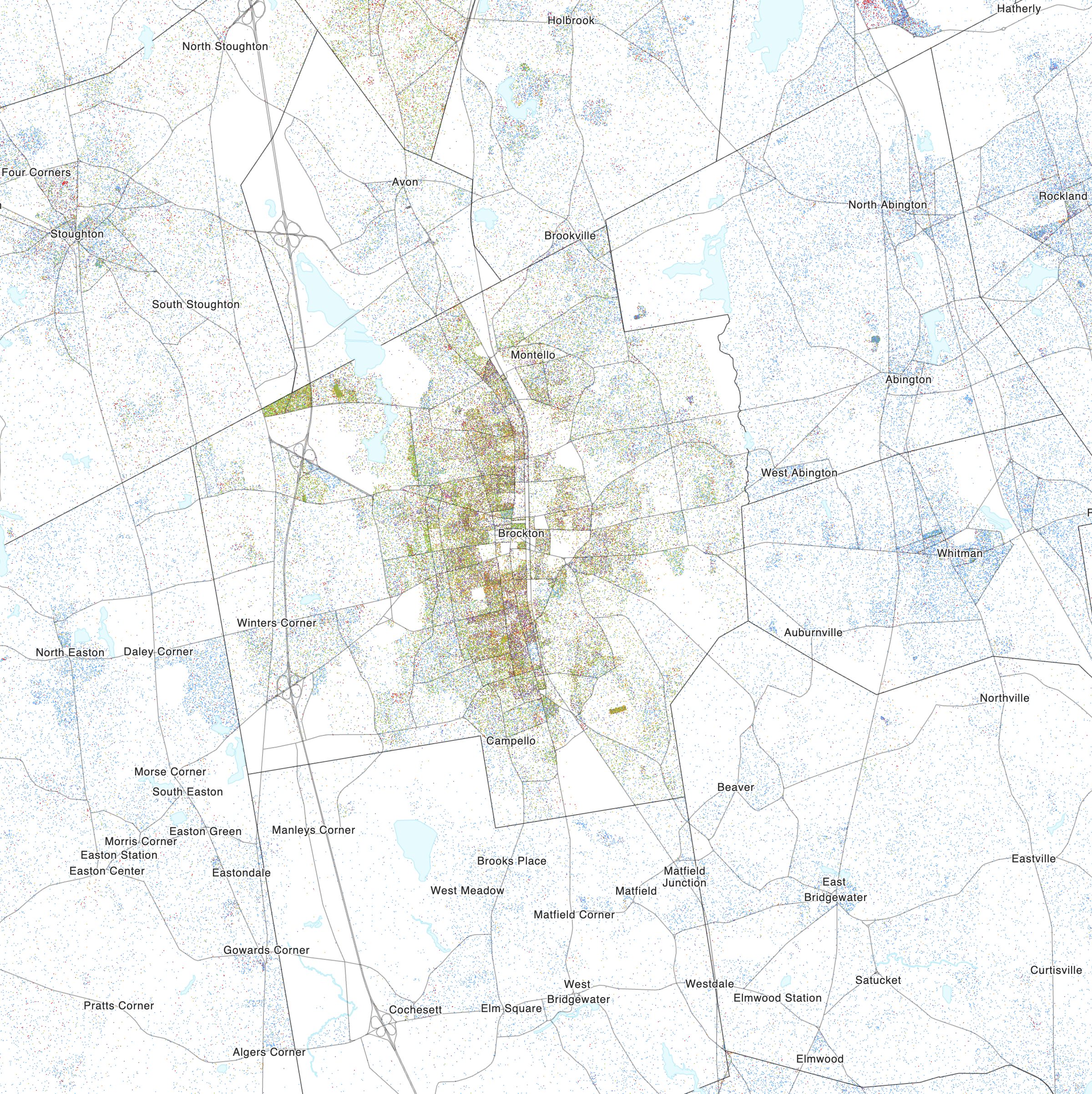
Map of racial distribution in Brockton, 2020 U.S. census. Each dot is one person: ⬤ White ⬤ Black ⬤ Asian ⬤ Hispanic ⬤ Multiracial ⬤ Native American/Other

=== 2020 census ===
Brockton, Massachusetts – Racial and ethnic composition Note: the US Census treats Hispanic/Latino as an ethnic category. This table excludes Latinos from the racial categories and assigns them to a separate category. Hispanics/Latinos may be of any race.
Race / Ethnicity (NH = Non-Hispanic)	Pop 2000	Pop 2010	Pop 2020	% 2000	% 2010	% 2020
White (NH)	54,902	40,268	29,392	58.22%	42.93%	27.82%
Black or African American (NH)	15,913	27,939	35,656	16.87%	29.78%	33.75%
Native American or Alaska Native (NH)	276	253	232	0.29%	0.27%	0.22%
Asian (NH)	2,044	2,131	2,243	2.17%	2.27%	2.12%
Pacific Islander or Native Hawaiian (NH)	27	37	28	0.03%	0.04%	0.03%
Some other race (NH)	6,971	8,329	7,315	7.39%	8.88%	6.92%
Mixed race or Multiracial (NH)	6,619	5,496	18,015	7.02%	5.86%	17.05%
Hispanic or Latino (any race)	7,552	9,357	12,762	8.01%	9.97%	12.08%
Total	94,304	93,810	105,643	100.00%	100.00%	100.00%

As of the census of 2020, there were 105,643 people, 31,440 households, and about 3.04 people living in each household, and about an average family size of 3.59. The population density was 4,486.3 people per square mile. The racial makeup of the city treating Hispanics as if a separate race was 27.8% White, 33.8% African American, 0.2% Native American, 2.1% Asian, 0.03% Pacific Islander, 6.9% other race; 17.1% Mixed race or Multiracial, and 12.1% Hispanic or Latino of any race. The African-American population in Brockton has grown significantly since the beginning of the early 2000s. The most reported ancestries in 2020 were:

- Cape Verdean (19.4%)
- Haitian (13%)
- African American (10.7%)
- Irish (10%)
- Italian (5.2%)
- Puerto Rican (5.2%)
- English (4.8%)
- Portuguese (2.1%)
- German (2%)
- French (1.8%)

Brockton has one of the largest populations of Cape Verdean ancestry in the United States. Per the 2023 American Community Survey five-year estimates, the Cape Verdean American population was 16,753 or approximately 16% of the population. Brockton also has a significant Angolan American community.

Statistically, Brockton is the most populous and most densely populated community in Plymouth County. It is the sixth largest community in the commonwealth. However, it is only the twenty-seventh most densely populated community in the Commonwealth.

As of 2010, there were 33,675 households, out of which 35.0% had children under the age of 18 living with them, 42.0% were married couples living together, 19.9% had a female householder with no husband present, and 32.4% were non-families. 26.6% of all households were made up of individuals, and 9.5% had someone living alone who was 65 years of age or older. In the city, the population was spread out, with 27.8% under the age of 18, 9.1% from 18 to 24, 30.5% from 25 to 44, 20.8% from 45 to 64, and 11.7% who were 65 years of age or older. The median age was 34 years. For every 100 females, there were 92.1 males. For every 100 females age 18 and over, there were 87.4 males.

As of 2018, the median income for a household in Brockton is $55,140. Males have an average income of $41,093 versus $35,145 for females. The per capita income for the city was $17,163. The poverty rate in Brockton is 15.61% of the population. Notably by race, 23.55% of Hispanics were in poverty, while the Black population of Brockton had about 18.61% of its population living in poverty.

=== Crime ===
Brockton has been cited in several crime analyses as having one of the higher violent crime rates in Massachusetts. For example, NeighborhoodScout’s analysis of FBI-reported data estimates Brockton’s annual risk of violent victimization at approximately 1 in 165. Additional comparative summaries ranking Massachusetts municipalities by violent crime per capita have also placed Brockton among the state’s more dangerous cities, with reported violent crime rates generally falling in the roughly 600–700 incidents per 100,000 residents, depending on the year and methodology.

=== Income ===
Data is from the 2009–2013 American Community Survey 5-Year Estimates.

Rank	ZIP Code (ZCTA)	Per capita income	Median household income	Median family income	Population	Number of households
	Massachusetts	$35,763	$66,866	$84,900	6,605,058	2,530,147
	Plymouth County	$35,220	$75,092	$90,431	497,386	179,617
	United States	$28,155	$53,046	$64,719	311,536,594	115,610,216
1	02301 (West Brockton)	$22,728	$61,060	$65,914	34,929	11,516
	Brockton	$21,942	$49,025	$57,773	93,911	32,856
2	02302 (East Brockton)	$21,477	$44,144	$53,080	58,982	21,340

== Arts and culture ==
=== Music ===
Brockton is home to the Brockton Symphony Orchestra, a community orchestra founded in 1948. The orchestra performs five or six concerts per season at local venues such as Brockton's West Middle School Auditorium and the Oliver Ames Auditorium in the neighboring town of Easton. The orchestra comprises 65 musicians from the greater Brockton area and its musical director since 2007 is James Orent, a guest conductor of the Boston Symphony Orchestra and Boston Pops.

=== Festivals ===
- Brockton Summer Concert Series
- Downtown Brockton Arts and Music Festival – End of August annually
- Towerfest – Columbus Day Weekend annually
- Cape Verdean Festival – Last Sunday in July

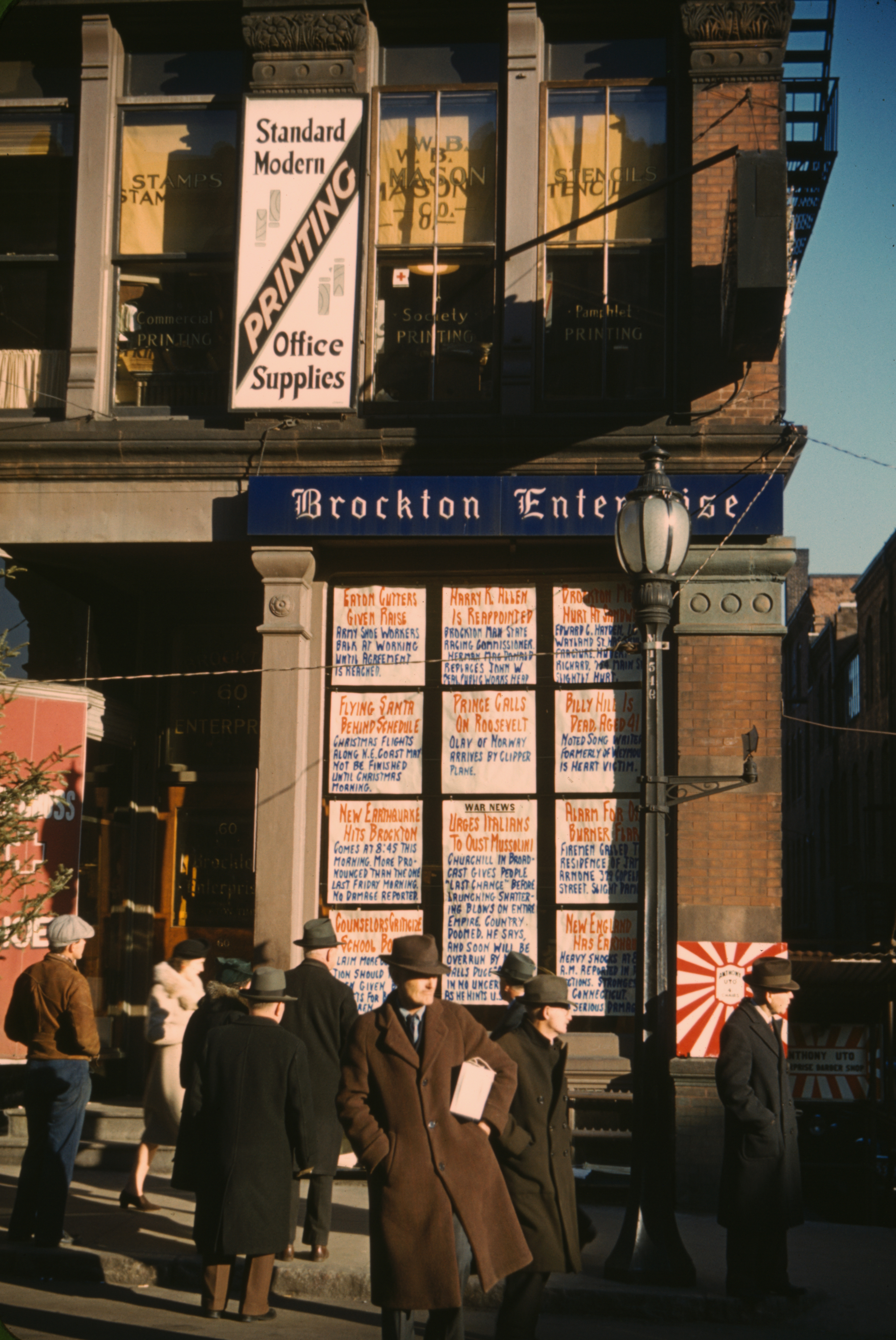
Headlines posted in street-corner window of newspaper office (Brockton Enterprise), 60 Main Street, Brockton, Massachusetts, December 1940. Additionally upstairs, the first main offices of W.B. Mason.

=== Library ===
The city supports three buildings within the Brockton Public Library system. The main library is a Carnegie building.

=== Notable sites ===
- Brockton Airport – formerly, now the South Side Shopping Center
- Fuller Craft Museum
- Westgate Mall

==== Sites listed on National Register of Historic Places ====
- Brockton City Hall
- Brockton Edison Electric Illuminating Company Power Station
- Central Fire Station
- Curtis Building
- Dr. Edgar Everett Dean House
- D.W. Field Park
- Forest Avenue School
- Franklin Block
- Gardner J. Kingman House
- Goldthwaite Block
- Howard Block
- Lyman Block
- Moses Packard House
- Old Post Office Building
- Snow Fountain and Clock
- South Street Historic District

== Sports ==
Based at Campanelli Stadium, the Brockton Rox are a professional baseball team competing in the Frontier League. The team began play in 2024 as the New England Knockouts, and changed their name in January 2025.

An earlier Brockton Rox team played in the Futures Collegiate Baseball League (FCBL). From 2003 through 2011, the team was a member of the independent professional Can-Am League, then in 2012 joined the amateur FCBL. Collegiate players on FCBL teams, who are looking for more experience and scouting exposure, are offered non-paid playing opportunities.

== Government ==
On the national level, Brockton is a part of Massachusetts's 8th congressional district, and has been represented since January 2013 by Stephen Lynch.

On the state level, Brockton is represented in three districts in the Massachusetts House of Representatives: the Ninth Plymouth, Tenth Plymouth (which includes West Bridgewater and Precinct 1 of East Bridgewater), and the Eleventh Plymouth (which includes most of Easton). The city is represented in the Massachusetts Senate as a part of the Second Plymouth and Bristol district, which includes Halifax, Hanover, Hanson, Whitman and portions of East Bridgewater and Easton

Brockton has a city government led by a mayor and city council. The city elects a mayor for two-year terms. Previous mayors include Winthrop H. Farwell Jr., John T. Yunits Jr., David Crosby, Carl Pitaro, Richard L. Wainwright, John E. Sullivan, Alvin Jack Sims, Joseph H. Downey, Paul Studenski and Robert F. Sullivan. James Harrington was elected mayor in 2005 and began his term in January 2006. In the fall of 2009, City Councilor Linda Balzotti defeated Harrington to become the city's first female mayor. Balzotti was defeated in 2013 by Bill Carpenter, who won the election by only 44 votes. After the unexpected death of Bill Carpenter on July 3, 2019, City Councillor President Moises Rodrigues become the acting Mayor. On July 15, 2019 Rodrigues was unanimously elected by the 11-person City Council to become the Mayor of Brockton. Rodrigues became the first person of color to become Mayor of Brockton after serving six years on the Brockton city council, and was elected by popular vote in 2026. In 2009, community activist Jass Stewart was elected to councilor-at-large becoming the first African American to serve in Brockton's city council. The city council consists of four Councilors-at-Large and seven ward Councilors, one for every ward in the city. As of January 2026, the mayor of Brockton is Moises M. Rodrigues.

Voter Registration and Party Enrollment as of November 24, 2024
Party	Number of Voters	Percentage
Democratic	26,731	38.81%
Republican	3,524	5.12%
Libertarian	219	0.32%
Unenrolled	37,767	54.84%
Total	68,872	100%

Presidential election results
Year	Democratic	Republican
2024	70.5% 24,727	27.4% 9,599
2020	76.1% 29,475	22.4% 8,689
2016	71.0% 25,593	24.4% 8,801
2012	73.6% 25,262	25.4% 8,710
2008	69.5% 23,299	28.8% 9,646
2004	66.0% 20,091	33.1% 10,058
2000	65.6% 18,563	29.3% 8,288
1996	62.0% 16,361	26.4% 6,972
1992	44.3% 13,209	29.7% 8,863
1988	47.2% 14,776	51.2% 16,056
1984	45.0% 14,130	54.7% 17,161
1980	38.4% 12,751	46.2% 15,350

== Education ==
=== Public schools ===
Brockton operates its own school system for the city's approximately 17,000 students. There is an early education school (Barrett Russell), ten elementary schools (Angelo, Arnone, Baker, Brookfield, Downey, George, Gilmore, Hancock, John F. Kennedy and Raymond), the Davis K–8 school, six middle/junior high schools (North, East, West, South, Ashfield and the Plouffe Academy), Brockton High School and four alternative schools (Huntington, Edison, Champion and B.B. Russell). Brockton High School's athletics teams are called the Boxers (after the city's undefeated heavyweight boxing champion, Rocky Marciano). In February 2024, Brockton High School entered the national spotlight following four district committee members requesting National Guard assistance via letter to the state’s Governor to deal with increasing levels of violence between students and security staffing shortages at the school, a request opposed by the Mayor of Brockton at the time.Brockton mayor opposes proposal to bring National Guard to high school for security - CBS Boston

=== Private schools ===
Brockton was home to three parochial schools (Sacred Heart, Saint Casimir and Saint Edward) which merged in 2007 to form two schools. Trinity Lower Campus at the former Saint Edwards school site, and Trinity Upper Campus located on the former site of the Saint Colman's school, one Christian school (South Shore Christian and the Brockton Christian School closed in 2010), and Cardinal Spellman High School, a Catholic high school named for Francis Cardinal Spellman, Brockton area native and former Archbishop of New York. Students may also choose to attend tuition-free Southeastern Regional Vocational Technical High School (in South Easton).

=== Higher education ===
Brockton is the site of Massasoit Community College and offers Adult Studies/LEAD classes in the city. Fisher College, Eastern Nazarene College, and Porter and Chester Institute also have campuses in the city. Brockton is also home to the Brockton Hospital School of Nursing as well as the Monna Bari Medical School.

== Infrastructure ==
=== Transportation ===
==== Major highways ====
Massachusetts Route 24, a six-lane divided motorway, passes through the west side of the city, with exits at Route 27 to the north and Route 123 to the south. The two routes pass through the center of the city, crossing at that point. Massachusetts Route 28 passes from north to south through the center of the city, The western end of Route 14 (at its intersection with Route 27) and the southern end of Route 37 (at its intersection with Route 28) both are in the city.

==== Bus ====
Brockton has its own bus services, operated by the Brockton Area Transit Authority (BAT). Each bus has a designated route running through a section of Brockton, i.e. Montello, Campello, Cary Hill, etc. There are also buses that have routes outside the city, i.e., Bridgewater Industrial Park, Ashmont Station (MBTA subway end-of-line), Stoughton and a connecting bus stop in Montello to the Braintree Station (MBTA subway end-of-line).

==== Rail ====
The Fall River/New Bedford Line of the MBTA Commuter Rail system runs north-south through Brockton with stations at Montello, Brockton, and Campello.

=== Healthcare ===
Brockton has three hospitals: Signature Healthcare Brockton Hospital on the east side, Boston Medical Center – South (formerly Good Samaritan, and before that Cardinal Cushing) Hospital to the northwest, and the Brockton Veterans Administration Hospital to the southwest. The VA Hospital is the sponsoring institution for the Harvard South Shore Psychiatry program. It serves as a teaching facility for students of various medical specialties from Boston University, physician assistant students from Northeastern University, nursing students from the University of Massachusetts Boston and physician assistant and pharmacy students from the Massachusetts College of Pharmacy and Health Sciences.

Brockton has a community health center that serves individuals with low income and poor access to health care at Brockton Neighborhood Health Center.

=== Fire department ===
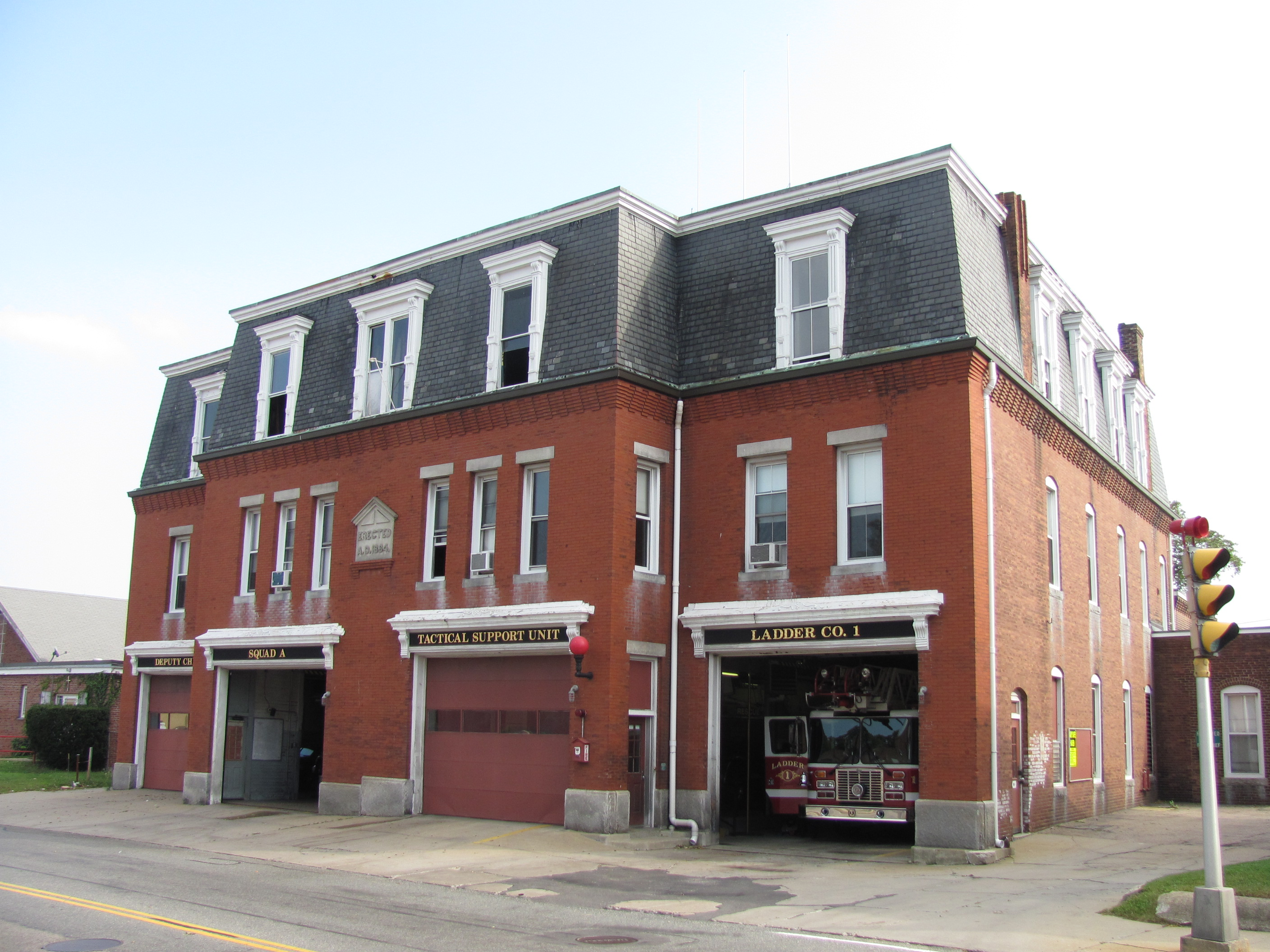
Central Fire Station

The city of Brockton is protected around the clock by 174 paid, professional firefighters of the city of Brockton Fire Department. The Brockton Fire Department currently operates out of six fire stations, located throughout the city, and maintains a fire apparatus fleet of five engines, three ladders, one squad, one tactical rescue unit and several other special, support, and reserve units. The fire department does not provide EMS services; ambulance coverage is currently contracted to Brewster Ambulance Service.

In 1905, local newspapers recounted many heroic acts by Brockton firefighters during the Grover Shoe Factory disaster. On March 10, 1941, thirteen Brockton firefighters died when the roof collapsed as they were fighting a fire at the Strand Theatre. That fire resulted in one of the worst firefighting tragedies in American history.

=== Law enforcement ===
The City of Brockton Police Department has roughly 181 sworn members and 31 non-sworn employees. The officers are assigned to the Patrol Division, and Operations Division which includes; Detectives, Narcotics, Gang Unit, Special Weapons And Tactics, K-9, Quality of Life, GREAT Program, Elderly Affairs, and Community Education Units. In addition, the city is patrolled by the Fourth (Middleborough) Barracks of Troop D of the Massachusetts State Police. Brockton also has several citizen anti-crime groups, including the Guardian Angels and Operation Archangel.

== Notable people ==
- Kristian Alfonso, actress
- Jo Baker, singer and songwriter; niece of Mary E. Baker
- Mary E. Baker, first African-American to work at Brockton City Hall; civic leader
- Steve Balboni, professional baseball player
- Ronnie Bardah, professional poker player and Survivor: Island of the Idols contestant
- Darius Bazley, professional basketball player
- Chris Bender, R&B singer
- Bumpy Bumpus, sprint car racer
- Alfred Campanelli, businessman
- Andrew Card, politician
- John Cariani, actor, playwright
- Bobby Chouinard, rock drummer
- Patrick Condon, author and professor of urban design
- Robert Cottle, television personality
- Jim Corbett, NFL player
- William Damon, psychologist and author
- Al Davis, owned Oakland Raiders
- John Doucette, actor
- Levi Lewis Dorr, American Civil War veteran and physician
- John M. Dowd, lawyer
- Bonnie Dumanis, District Attorney of San Diego County
- AJ Dybantsa, basketball player
- James Edgar, first department store Santa
- Shawn Fanning, creator of Napster
- Kenneth Feinberg, attorney
- George Wilton Field, marine biologist
- Keith Gill, stock investor
- Edward Gilmore, first Democrat elected to US Congress from Plymouth County
- Brian Gordon, cartoonist known for Fowl Language
- Scott Gordon, professional hockey player, head coach of New York Islanders
- Noel Gourdin, singer
- Marvin Hagler, professional middleweight boxing champion
- Pooch Hall, actor
- Rudy Harris, professional football player
- Josephine Hasham, women's professional baseball player
- Josh Hennessy, professional hockey player
- George V. Higgins, author
- Pete Hughes, college baseball coach
- David Hungerford (1927–1993), geneticist, co-discoverer of Philadelphia chromosome
- George Hurley, musician
- Megan Khang, professional golfer
- Al Louis-Jean, NFL player
- Joe Lauzon, professional MMA fighter
- George N. Leighton, United States court judge
- Jimmy Luxury, musician
- Ken MacAfee, professional football player
- Jim Mann, professional baseball player
- Rocky Marciano, undefeated heavyweight boxing champion
- Bill McGunnigle, inventor of the baseball glove
- Greg McMurtry, professional football player
- Arthur Mercante Sr., boxing referee
- Christy Mihos, entrepreneur, politician
- Ed Nelson, professional basketball player
- Sean Newcomb, professional baseball player
- Aaron O'Brien, retired, six time champion softball player
- Leo Paquin, football player at Fordham University
- Goody Petronelli, boxing trainer
- Cory Quirk, professional hockey player
- Jodie Rivera, online personality
- Evelyn Scott, actress
- Robbie Sims, middleweight boxer
- Kevin Stevens, professional hockey player
- Jason Vega, professional football player
- Wyatt Tee Walker, civil rights leader
- Kevin Walsh, boxer
- Dave Wedge, author, journalist
- Art Whitney, professional baseball player
- Herbert Warren Wind, writer
- Jamie Loftus, writer and comedian

== Awards ==
Brockton was named one of the 100 Best Communities for Young People in the United States in 2005, 2008, 2010, and 2011 by the America's Promise Alliance.
