= Curtis Building =

- U.S. National Register of Historic Places
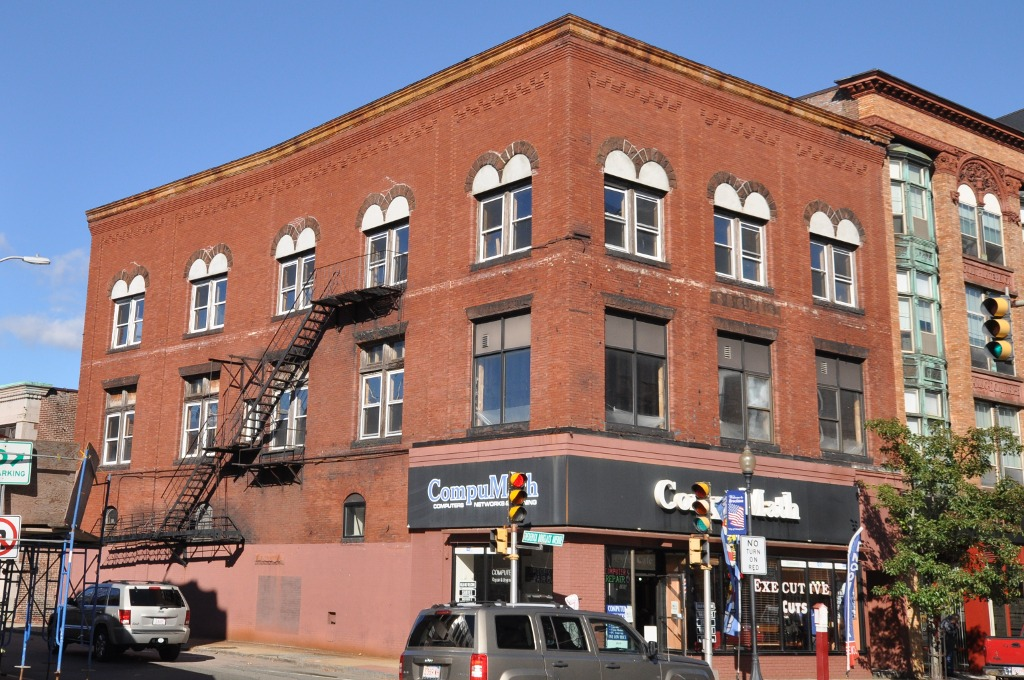

- Location within Massachusetts Location within the United States
- Location: 105–109 Main Street, Brockton, Massachusetts
- Coordinates: 42°4′59″N 71°1′15″W
- Built: 1898
- Architectural style: Romanesque
- NRHP reference No.: 82004424
- Added to NRHP: April 15, 1982

The Curtis Building is a historic commercial building in Brockton, Massachusetts, US. The three-story brick building was built in 1870, and is a fine local example of Romanesque styling. It features panel brick pilasters on the corners, and panel brick decoration in the cornices. Its window bays (three on Main Street, five on High Street), consist of paired windows separated by brick piers; the third floor windows are set in double round-arch openings.

The building was listed on the National Register of Historic Places in 1982.

== See also ==
- National Register of Historic Places listings in Plymouth County, Massachusetts
