= Harlow House =

Harlow House may refer to:

Historic buildings

- Harlow Old Fort House, Plymouth, Massachusetts
- Sgt. William Harlow Family Homestead, Plymouth, Massachusetts
- Elmer Harlow House, Eugene, Oregon
- Fred Harlow House, Troutdale, Oregon

Other

- House of Harlow, a jewelry line
