= Cape Cod (house) =

Architectural style

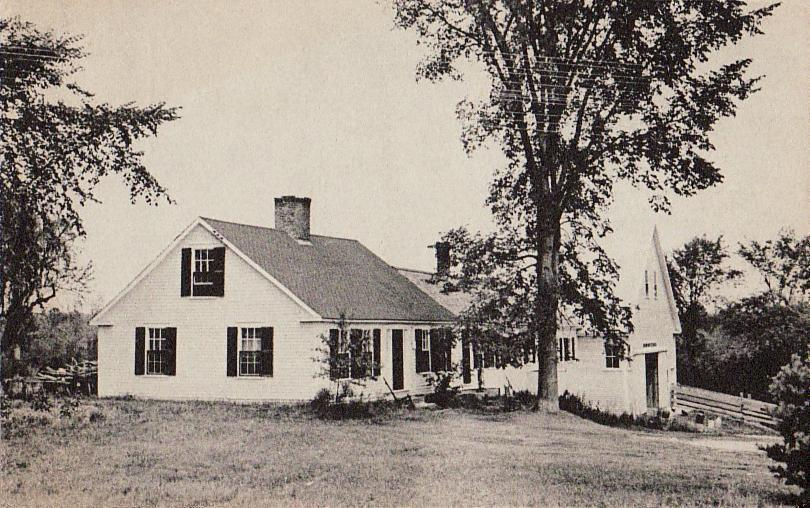
Cape Cod–style house c. 1920

A Cape Cod house is a low, broad, single or double-story frame building with a moderately-steep-pitched gabled roof, a large central chimney, and very little ornamentation. Originating in New England in the 17th century, the simple symmetrical design was constructed of local materials to withstand the stormy weather of Cape Cod. It features a central front door flanked by multipaned windows. The space above the first floor was often left as unfinished attic space, with or without windows on the gable ends.

The building type enjoyed a boom in popularity and adaptation to modern needs in the 1930s–1950s, particularly with Colonial Revival embellishments. It remains a feature of New England homebuilding.

== History ==
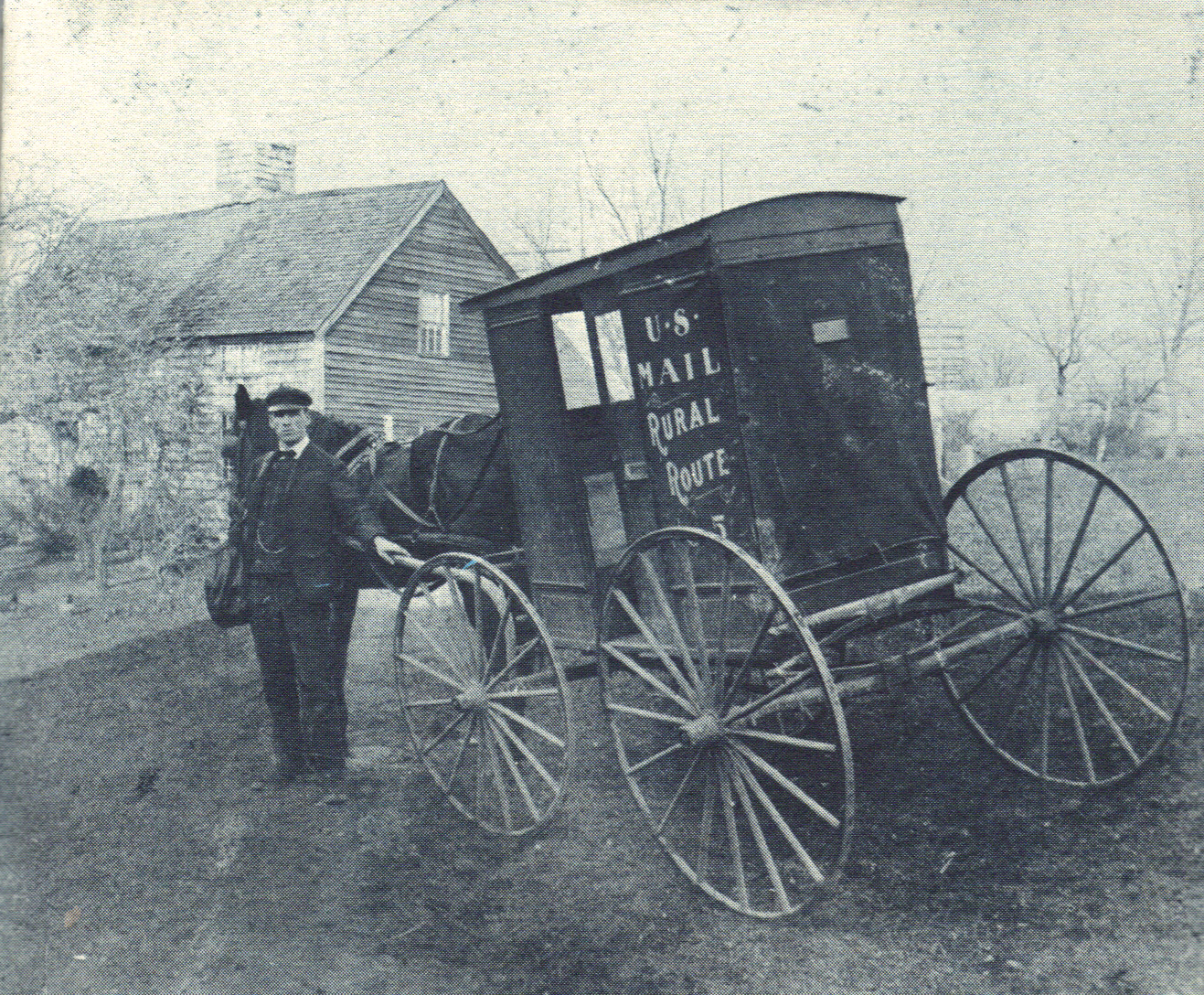
Ephraim Hawley House, built 1683–1690

The first Cape Cod style houses were developed by early settlers in America in the 1600s. The design pulled inspiration from architecture in Britain and was modified to adapt to the winter conditions in the New England area. In the past, the architectural design of the Cape Cod house was defined by the central placement of the chimney as it provided warmth to all rooms during the cold months. The roofs of the Cape Cod houses were steep in order to quickly get rid of snow and rain, as a means to protect the structure of the house. The roofs were made of cedar shingles to help keep out the cold. Temperatures in January and February can drop to −10 °F (−20 °C), with heavy snow accumulations, while in summer temperatures can often reach 90 °F (30 °C). To help with the heat in winter, they built massive central chimneys and low-ceilinged rooms to conserve heat, and the biggest windows faced south to catch the winter sun. The steep-roof characteristic of New England homes minimized snow load. Finally, colonists installed shutters on the windows to hold back heavy winds and the strong summer sun.

The Reverend Timothy Dwight IV (1752–1817), president of Yale University from 1795 to 1817, coined the term "Cape Cod house" after a visit to the Cape in 1800. His observations were published posthumously in Travels in New England and New York (1821–1822). The type was popularized more broadly in a slightly more elaborate Colonial Revival variant popularized in the 1930s–1950s, though traditional unornamented Capes remain common in New England. Early Cape Cod houses were described as half-houses, and they were 16 to 20 feet wide. Over time, bigger Cape Cod houses were constructed. They were referred to as three quarter houses and full capes depending on size. In the traditional Cape Cod architectural design, various materials were used to construct the houses.

=== Colonial and federal Capes (17th century – early 19th century) ===
Colonial-era Capes were most prevalent in the Northeastern United States and Atlantic Canada. They were made of wood and covered in wide clapboard or shingles, often unpainted, which weathered grey over time. Most houses were small, usually 1,000–2,000 square feet (100–200 m^{2}) in size. Often windows of different sizes were worked into the gable ends, with those of nine and six panes the most common.

The type has a symmetrical appearance, with the front door in the center of the house and a large central chimney that could often accommodate back-to-back fireplaces. The main bedroom was on the first floor, with an often-unfinished loft on the second. A typical early house had no dormers and little or no exterior ornamentation.

=== The Cape Cod Revival ===
The Cape Cod Revival took place from 1922 to 1955. It was the renaissance of the Cape Cod architectural design. The style of house would appear in magazines in the early 1920s and draw attention to its simplicity. Cape Cod houses were designed primarily out of necessity; therefore, they lack both complex and artistic design. The Cape Cod housing style was at its peak after World War II because soldiers returning to their families needed inexpensive housing. With the revival, the original design of the Cape Cod house was changed and adapted, leading to expansion on the exterior of the house.

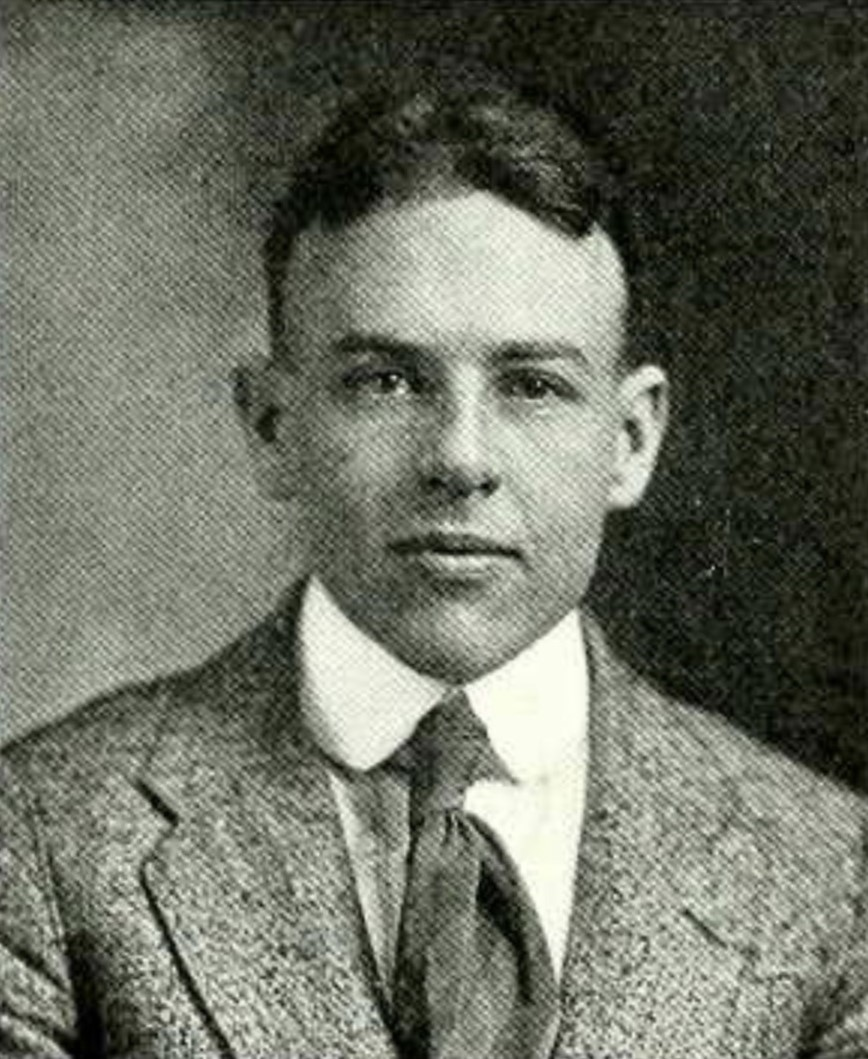
Royal Barry Wills

=== Royal Barry Willis ===
Royal Barry Willis founded his Boston-based architectural firm in 1925. He is described as the master of the Cape Cod architectural style. His career spanned through the 1920s to the 1960s, and during this time he designed 2,500 single-family residences. He also wrote eight books, hosted a radio program, and gave many lectures. His work earned him many accolades and he wrote many pieces of work for various newspapers and magazines about his architecture.

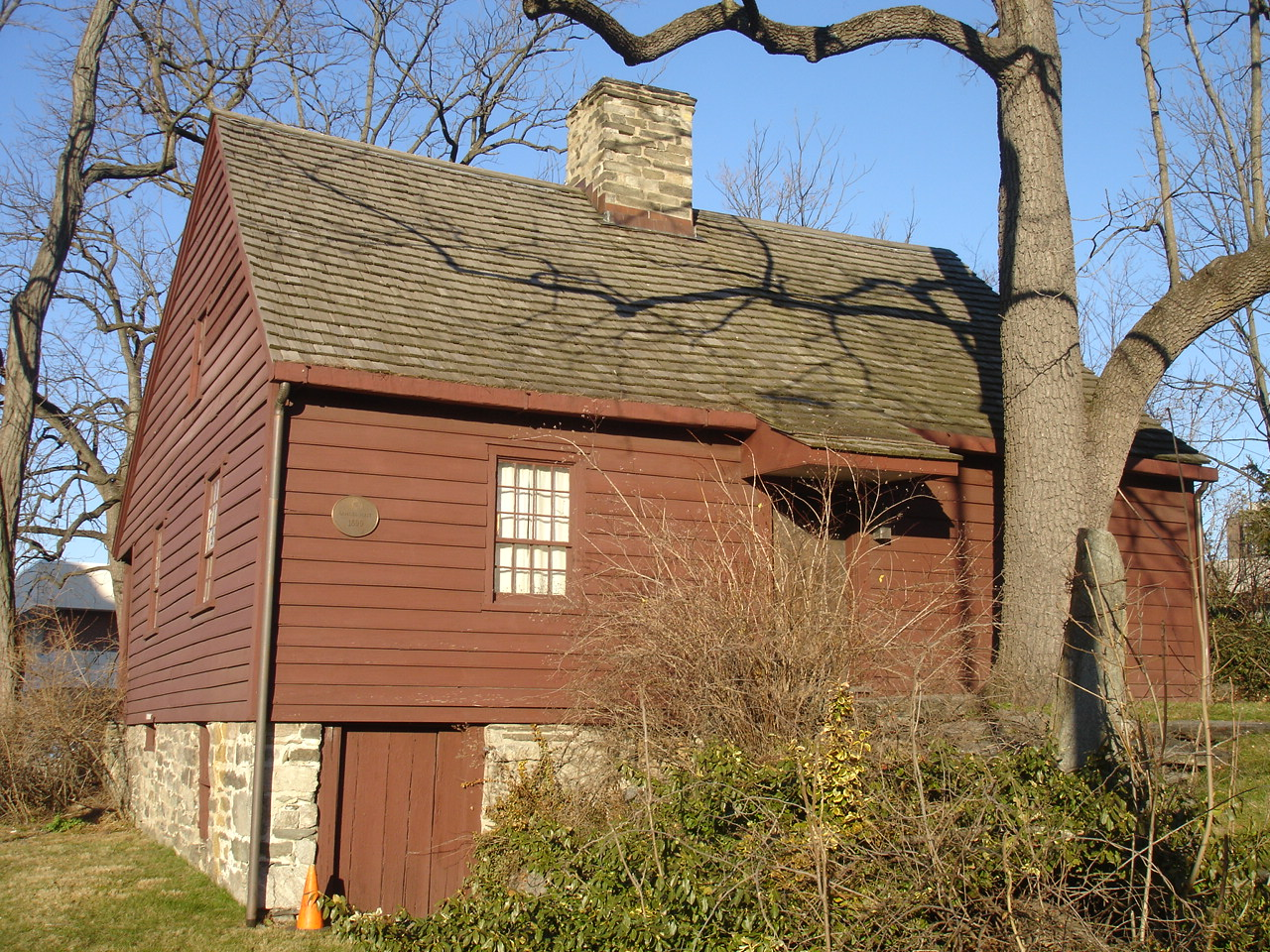
Hoyt-Barnum House, built c. 1699

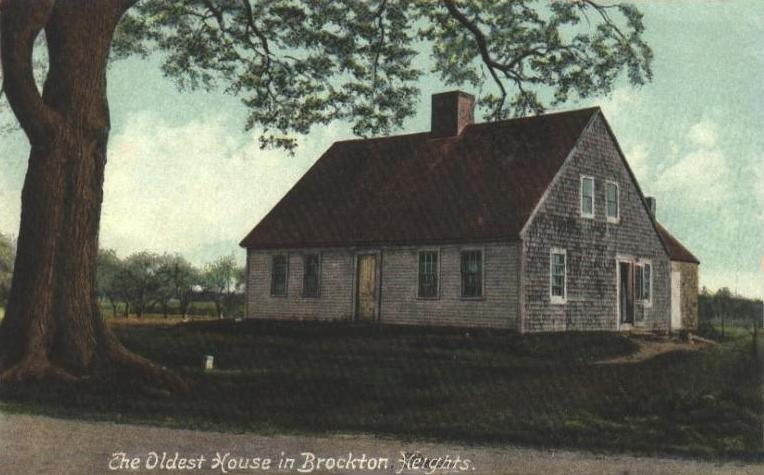
A traditional Cape Cod–style farmhouse in Brockton Heights, Massachusetts

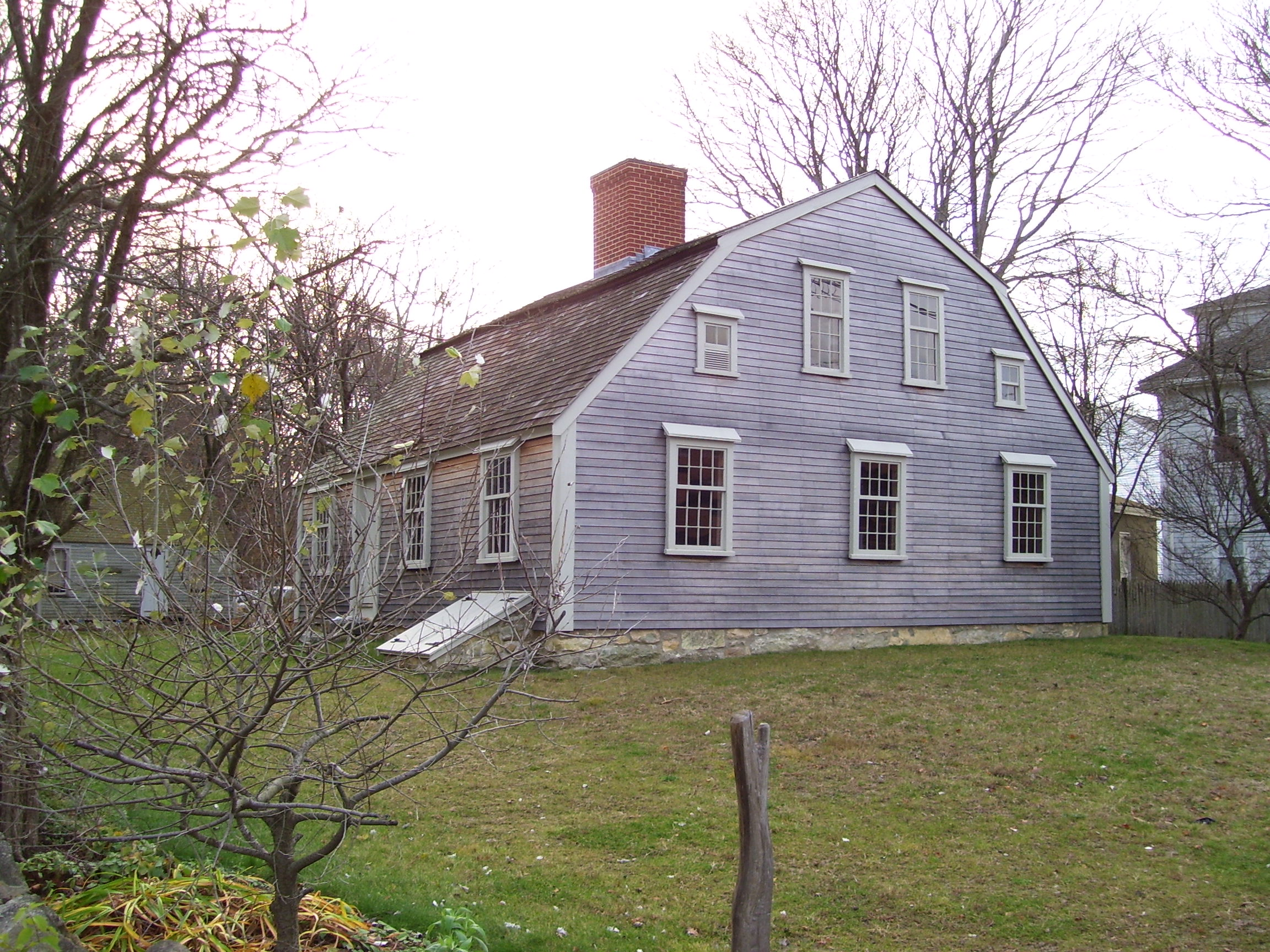
Harlow Old Fort House, an example of the rarer gambrel-roofed Cape

== Framing and layout ==
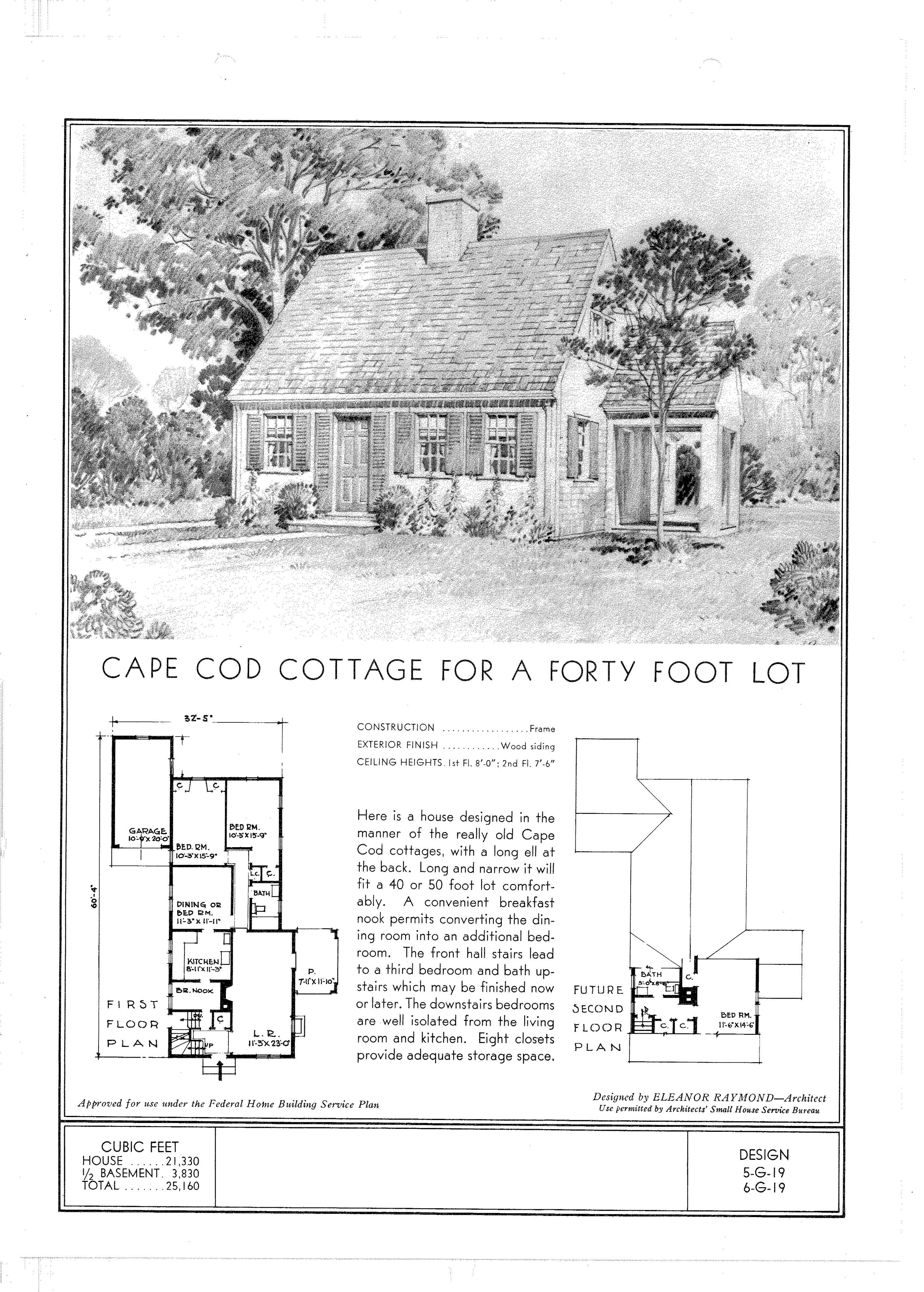
1940 federal-government plans for a three-quarter house designed by Eleanor Raymond

The overwhelming majority of early Capes were timber framed, with three bays formed by four bents. A few late examples of early Capes used stud framing, and plank framing was also used.

The first Cape Cod houses fall into four categories: the quarter, half, three-quarter, and full Cape. The comparatively rare quarter Cape is a single bay, usually a wider "outside" bay that becomes rooms. It has a single door and a single window on the front but is full depth. The half Cape is two bays, with a door to one side of the house and two windows on one side of the door; the three-quarter Cape has a door with two windows on one side and a single window on the other; while the full Cape consists of a front door in the center of the home, flanked on each side by two windows. Otherwise, the three categories of early Cape Cod houses were nearly identical in layout. Inside the front door, a central staircase led to the small upper level, which consisted of two children's bedrooms. The lower floor consisted of a hall for daily living (including cooking, dining, and gathering) and the parlor, or master bedroom.

Some use a different naming system and call the full-size version a "double Cape", but this is used more often for an extended duplex structure.

"High post", also known as "knee wall", Capes were originally an uncommon variant but became more common into the 19th century, emerging as a feature of Cape-derived vernacular architecture in the Midwest. The posts extend vertically past the first floor, increasing usable space on the second floor and simplifying joinery, at a cost of structural rigidity. The knee wall was often fenestrated with small, low windows.

== Adaptations ==
Modern full Cape Cod houses are completely symmetrical to resemble the traditional style. Modern three-quarter Cape Cod houses and half Cape Cod houses are much smaller with offset chimneys and stairs. The Cape Cod style has been revived not only because it is very inexpensive to build, it is easy to reconfigure. Over the years, owners doubled the full Cape and added wings onto the rear or sides, typically single-storied. Dormers were added for increased space, light, and ventilation. A screened-in porch was sometimes added to one side of the home (rarely the front). This style of house can be found in Massachusetts and in the more northern parts of New England.

== See also ==
- Cape Cod style of lighthouse architecture
- Strawberry box houses, homes built with a simplified Cape Cod design
- Ontario farmhouse architecture
