= Parkdale, Calgary =

Parkdale
- Neighbourhood
- Location of Parkdale in Calgary
- Coordinates: 51°03′32″N 114°08′19″W
- Country: Canada
- Province: Alberta
- City: Calgary
- Quadrant: NW
- Ward: 7
- Established: 1948
- Annexed: 1910

Government
  - Mayor: Jeromy Farkas
  - Administrative body: Calgary City Council
  - Councillor: Myke Atkinson (Independent)

Area
  - Total: 0.6 km^{2} (0.23 sq mi)
- Elevation: 1,060 m (3,480 ft)

Population (2012)
  - Total: 2,962
  - Average Income: $71,335 in 2,010
- Time zone: UTC−7 (MST)
- Postal code: T2N 2V3
- Area code: 403
- Website: Official website

Parkdale is a mature, inner city neighbourhood in the city of Calgary, Alberta along the north bank of the Bow River between the communities of West Hillhurst and Point McKay. It is bounded on the south by the Bow River, 28 St NW to the east, Shaganappi Trail NW to the west and on the north by 16th Avenue. Parkdale is in close proximity to both the Foothills Medical Centre and the Alberta Children's Hospital constructed in 2006, as well as the University of Calgary. Memorial Drive provides access to downtown Calgary and to Highway 1 which leads to the Rocky Mountains. Parkdale was annexed to the City of Calgary in 1910 when Calgary began to experience a "major economic and building boom." The boom ended in 1913 and further development of the Parkdale Addition as it was called, was halted because of World War I. Following World War II in the 1950s the dominant housing type that characterized Parkdale, was the bungalow. By 2014 Parkdale, like other inner city communities in Calgary, was experiencing gradual gentrification with small cottage-style bungalows being replaced by spacious flat roofed, Prairie School Frank Lloyd Wright inspired infills attracting young families with children away from the long commute suburbs to inner city ease of access to downtown, transit and work.

It is represented in the Calgary City Council by the Ward 7 councillor, Terry Wong, who is serving his first term after being elected in 2021.

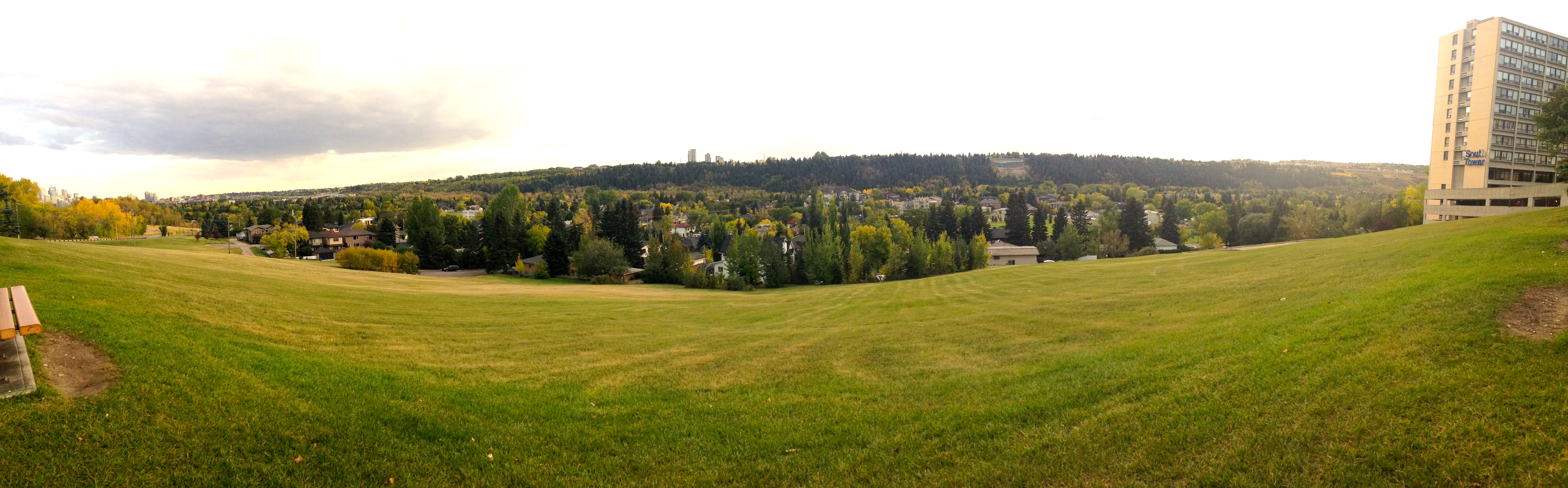
A view of Parkdale and the Bow River valley looking south

== History ==
In 1910, when Calgary was in a period of growth, Parkdale was annexed. By 1911 two streetcar lines provided access to the sparsely populated Parkdale community. The Bowness streetcar line went from Centre Street through Parkdale to Bowness and the Grand Trunk line, and the Parkdale-Hillhurst cars had its terminal at the Parkdale loop on 34th Street N.W. On 7 March 1911 Alfred S. McKay with Parkdale's pioneer real-estate developers, Scott and Hartronft, created a subdivision known at the time as Parkdale Addition, in the area between 29th Street N.W. and 37th Street N.W. They envisioned a subdivision for Calgary's professional class on the streetcar lines. Between 1911 and 1913 they built six houses along the north side of Parkdale Boulevard including the Craftsman style Betz and Withrow residences — heritage houses with character that contribute to the historic residential streetscape. McKay and his partners also built five upscale, larger brick homes on 37th Street N.W., some of which are also heritage homes.

According to Parkdale's resident historian, Marcel Hebert, by 1912, there were approximately 12 houses/farms located in Parkdale as farmers began to homestead there. One of the earliest Parkdale houses which was built in 1910, was a farm house that is still occupied by the original intergenerational family on 35th street NW.

According to Parkdale resident and author Robert M. Stamp, in April 1950 surveyor "R.M. McCutcheon trod through the grassy field on the north bank of the Bow River" in Parkdale and blocked out lots. They were about 45 to 48 feet wide and 108 to 120 in length. Nu-West Homes Ltd. built the standard story and a half Wartime Housing Models. During World War II homes built known as Victory Housing emerged in suburbs in several Canadian cities and towns to provide housing for workers in factories supplying items for WWII. Victory Housing employed a cheap and simple design meant for temporary use. After the war many of these houses were maintained (and many remain into the twenty-first century), but newer versions improved on the basic format. During the 1950s Keith Construction built 130 homes in Parkdale and Parkdale Addition. By 1951 13 of the new homes were inhabited.

In 1952 the Calgary Board of Education opened the 15-room spacious, modern and bright Parkdale Elementary School in 1952. It was the "largest of four schools opened by the Calgary School Board that year." In a Calgary Herald October 6, 1952 article, Parkdale was described as being located "on the Western outskirts of Calgary" in "one of the new and rapidly populating districts of Calgary." Along with the new school, city planners land use development in the 1950s also included the Parkdale Crescent for local businesses and recreational green space (in what is now the Parkdale Community Association complex where the Parkdale Community Garden and Gathering Place is located).

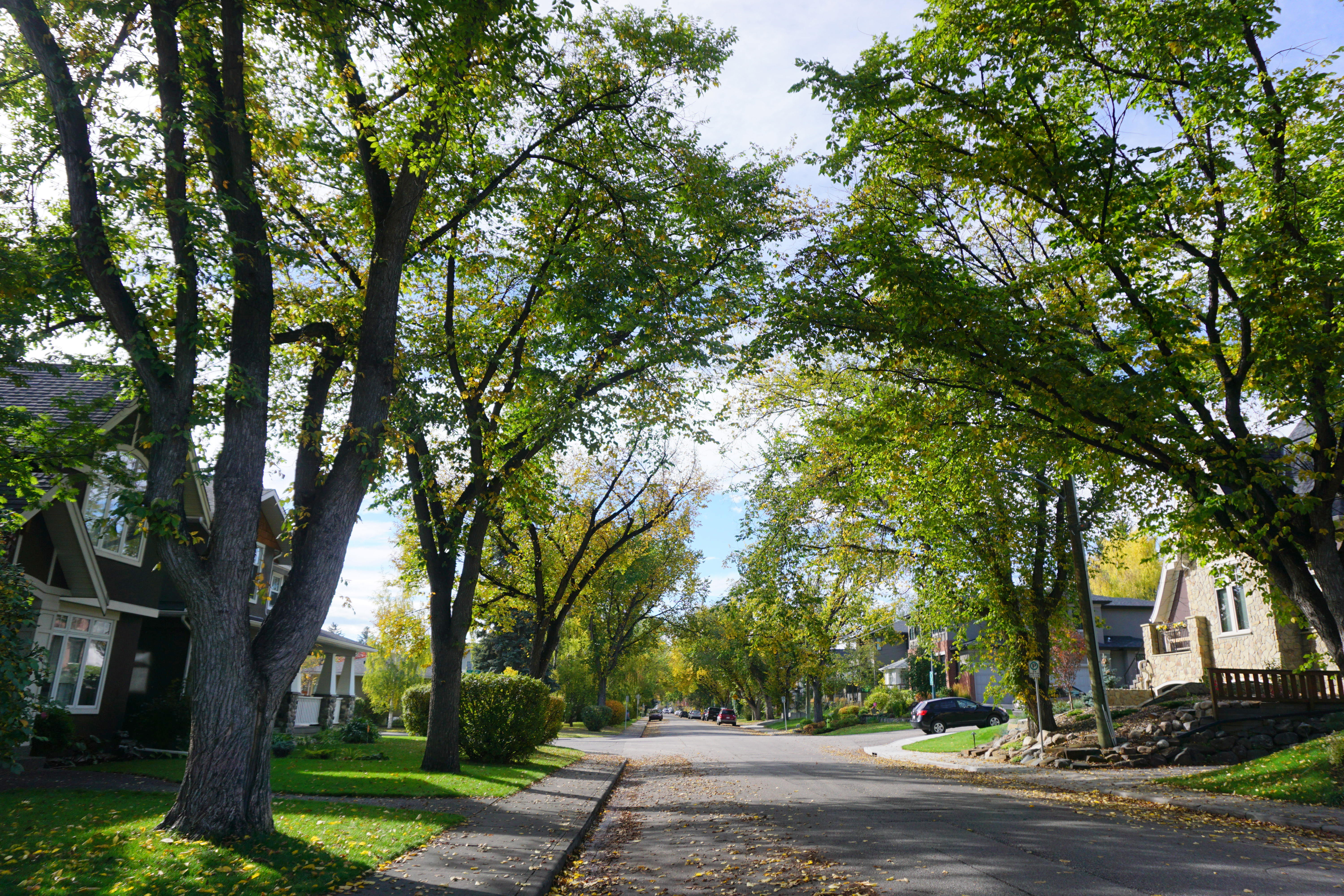
West Hillhurst, just east of Parkdale, Calgary, Alberta

Calgary experienced another major economic and building boom from 1972 to 1982. The city's economy grew when oil prices increased with the Arab Oil Embargo. In 1971 the city's population was 403,000. By 1989 it was 675,000; in 2007 it reached 1,020,000 and in 2014 it reached 1,419,800.

The Point McKay upscale condominium development was built in the 1970s to the east of Parkdale, replacing the Cinema Park Drive-In movie theatre.

In the 1980s the city of Calgary proposed the construction of a six-lane highway along the north side of the Bow River in Parkdale. The community was able to prevent it. The jogging and bike path were upgraded, a section of the Bow River pathway. By 2014 the citywide extensive Bow River pathway includes a popular loop that runs through Parkdale and includes the Peace Bridge to the east and the Harry Booth bridge in Point McKay to Edworthy Park.

By 2014 Everyday Tourist, Richard White, described how Parkdale and other inner city communities in Calgary, "are experiencing gradual redevelopment as old 600-square foot cottages are being torn down and replaced by either single family homes, duplexes or, if a developer can assemble enough land row housing, or in sometimes small condo projects." White argues that the newer, larger homes attract families with children which means that inner city schools, recreation and community centres become viable again and that "each new infill home will generate approximately $5,000/year more in taxes than the tiny cottage home." Indeed, Parkdale Elementary School, which was closed by the Calgary school board in 2002, reopened as an elementary school when Westmount Charter School moved its campus there in 2011. White claims that by 2014 in Calgary's inner city communities (like Parkdale), "new duplex homes cost $750,000+ and new single-family homes start at $1.2 million and condos are the new urban cottage with 600 square foot units starting at $300,000." White also argues that "while housing prices have increased, most of Calgary’s inner city communities have not seen the upscale retail and restaurant development usually associated with gentrification." For example, despite all of the development in Parkdale, they still have its "Lazy Loaf block," referring to Parkdale Crescent, a local commercial site included in the 1950s City planning direction.

=== Parkdale Community Heritage Inventory ===
In 2008 the City of Calgary and the Parkdale Community Association Heritage Subcommittee initiated the Parkdale Community Heritage Inventory which identified ten places in Parkdale for inclusion on the City of Calgary's Inventory of Historic Resources. They also noted 28 additional resources with "potential heritage value for reasons of natural history, archaeological potential, historical and/or architectural merit" that were recommended for inclusion on Calgary's Inventory of Evaluated Historic Resources.

== Green spaces ==
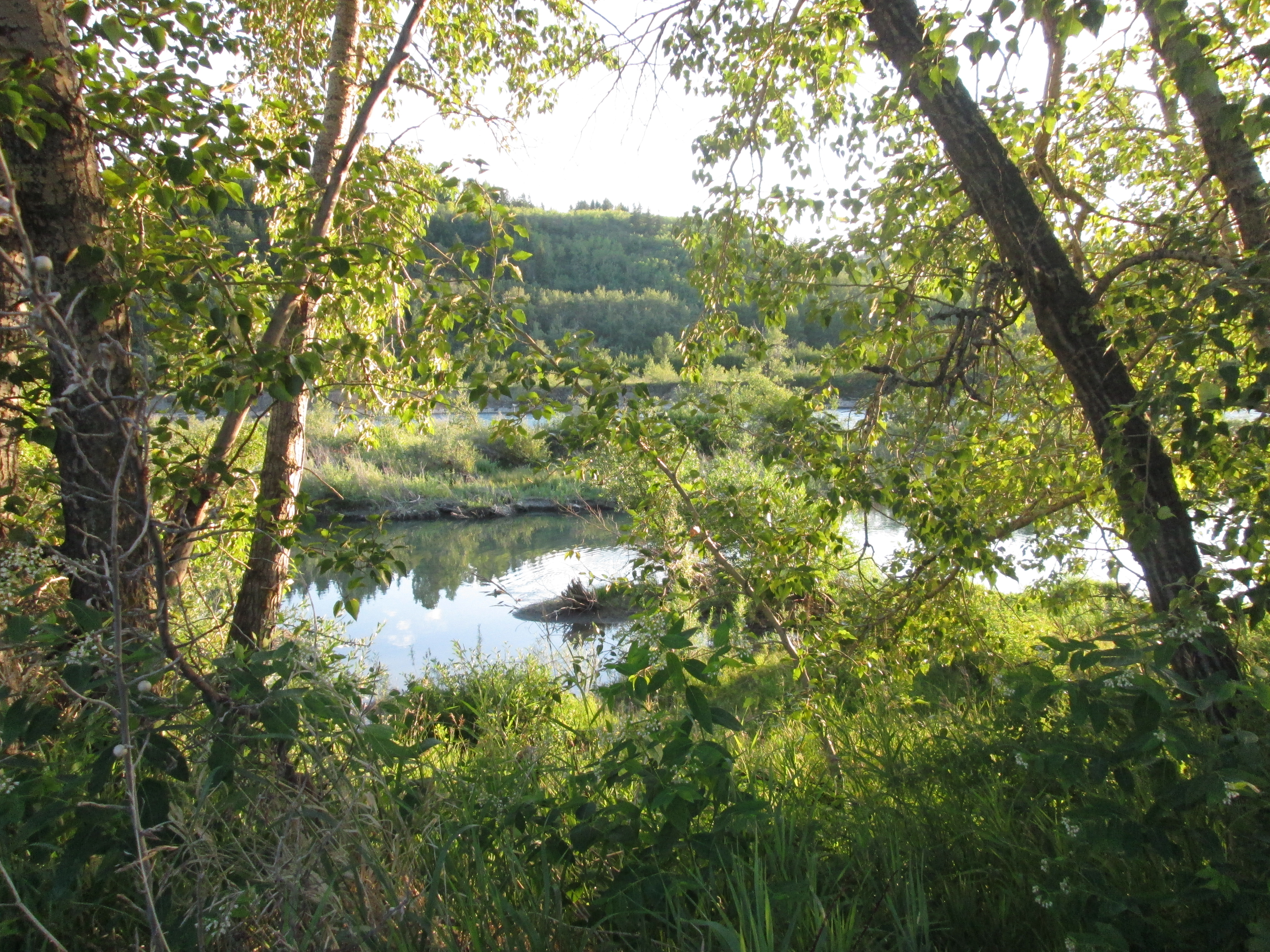
On Bow River Pathway Parkdale

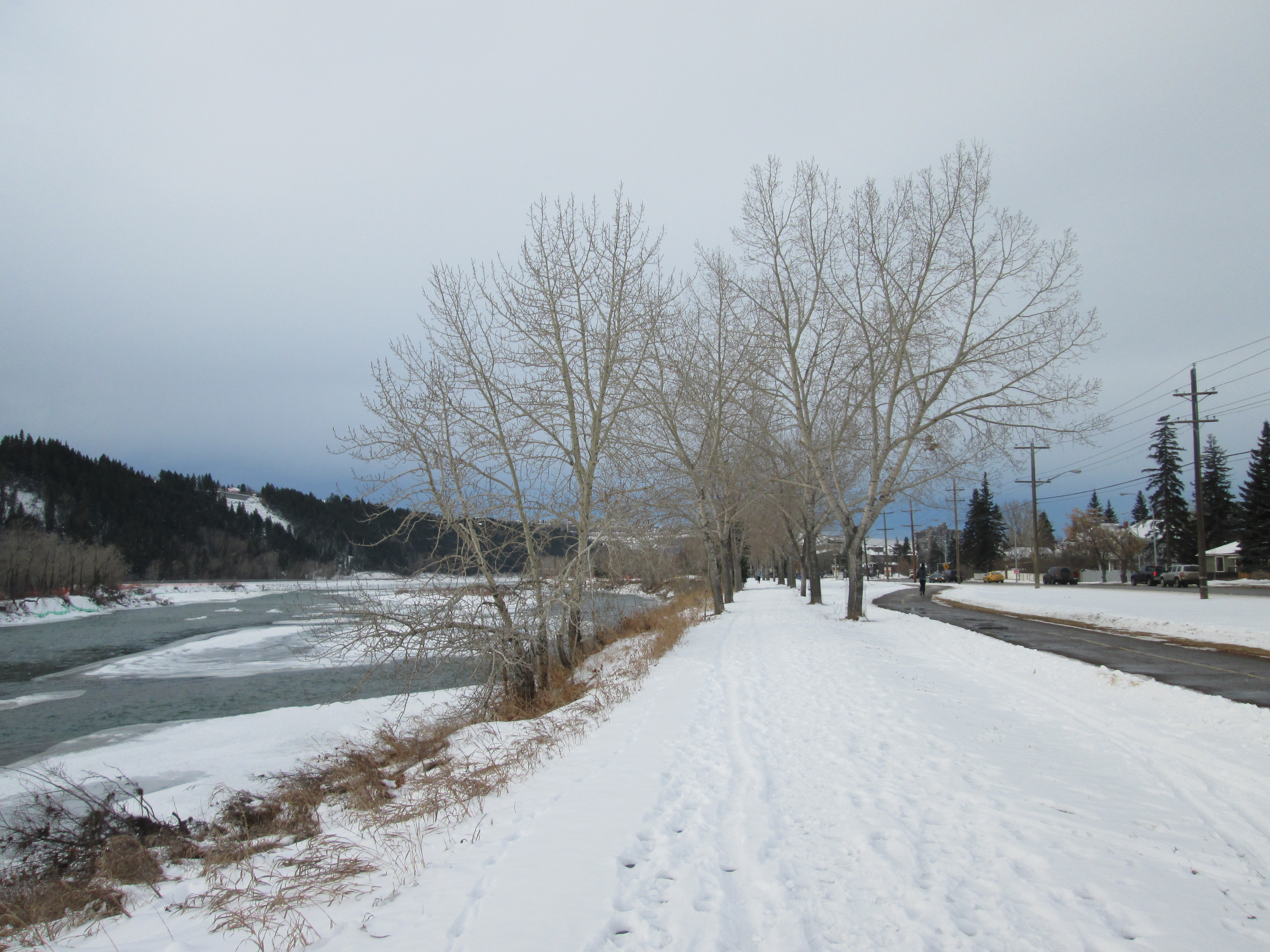
Bow River Pathway remains popular with joggers and cyclists all winter

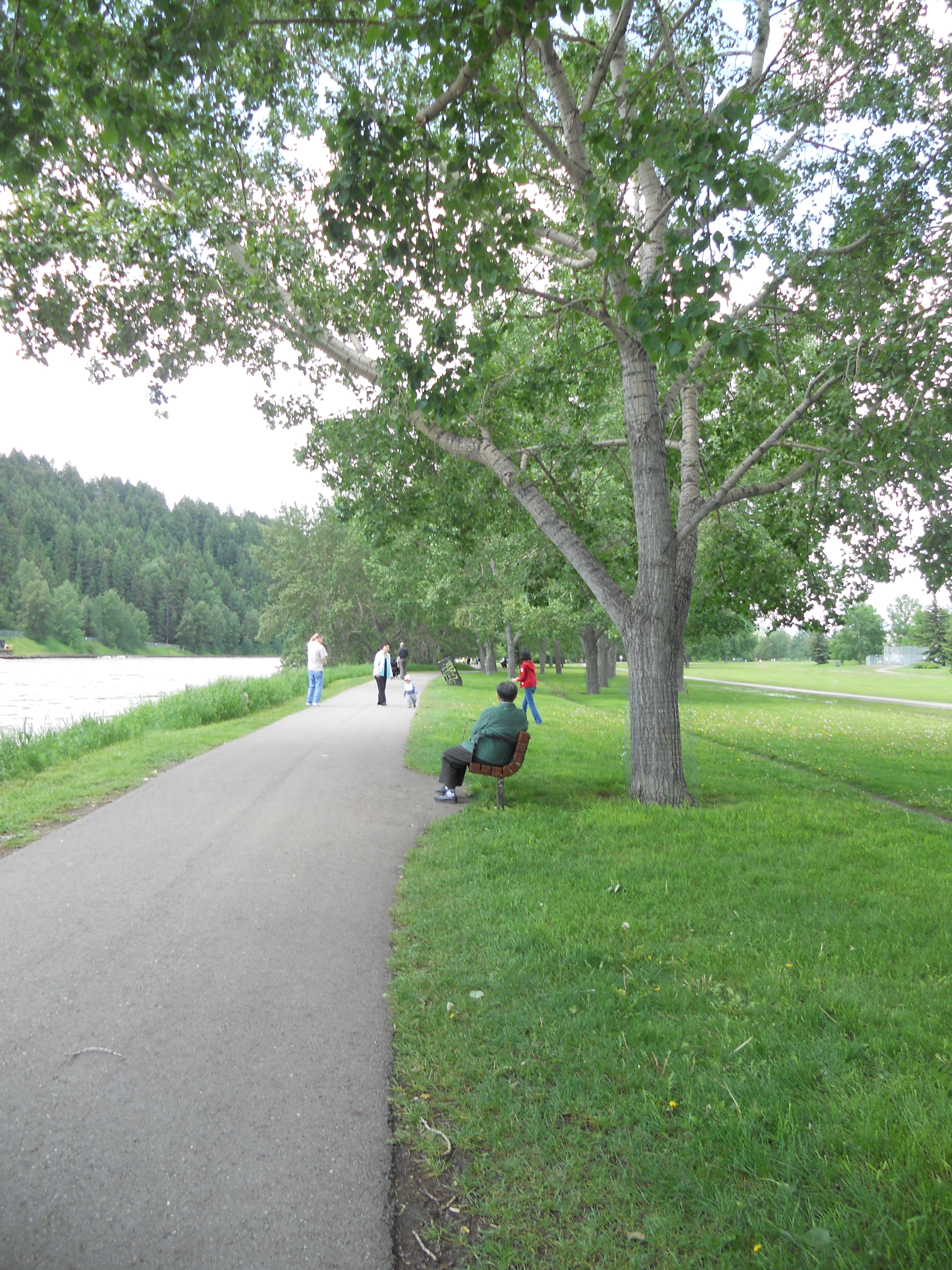
Bow River trail in Parkdale just after the 2013 flood

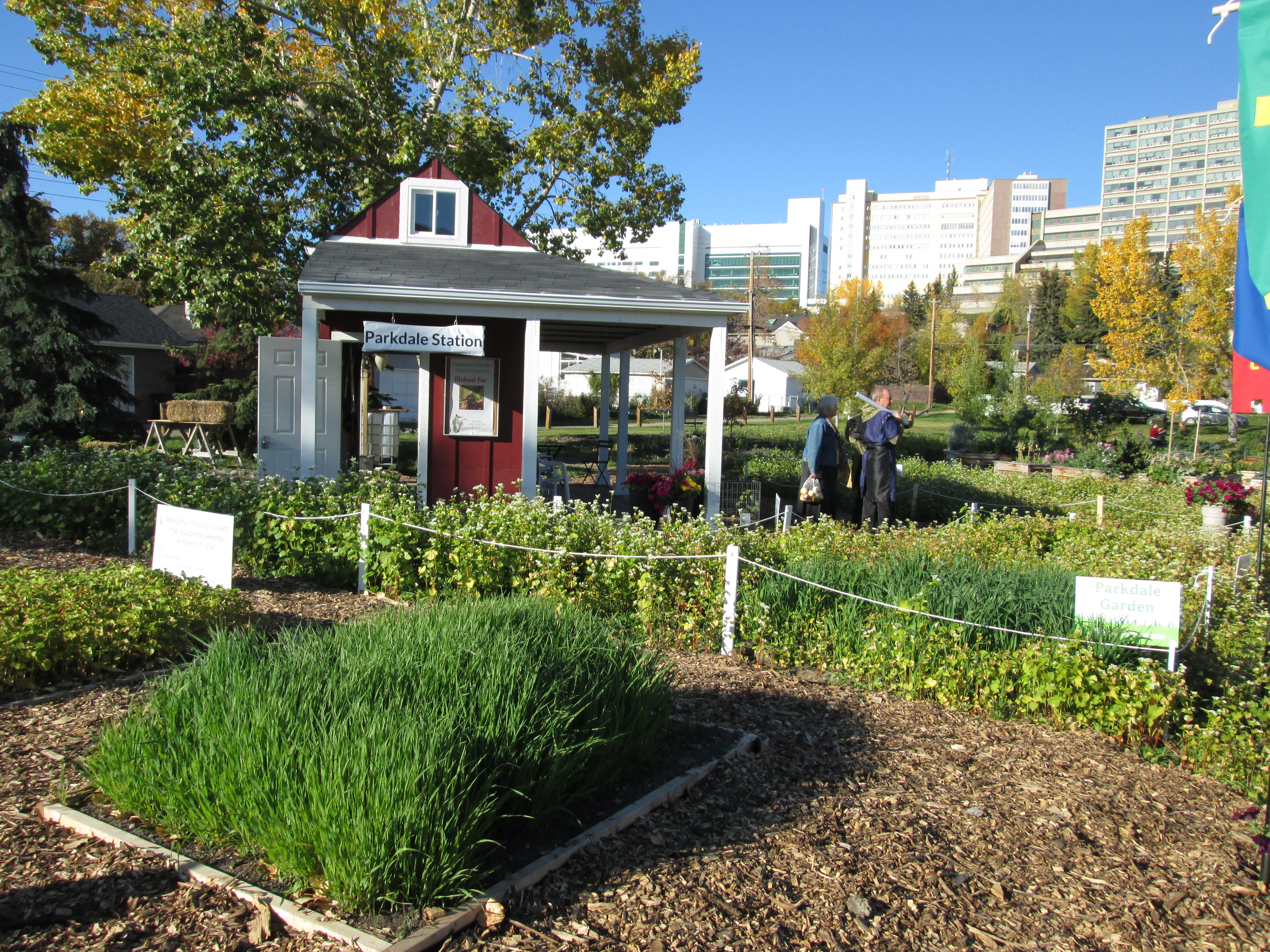
Parkdale's community garden shed - Parkdale Station - memorializes Calgary's historical connection to the railroad

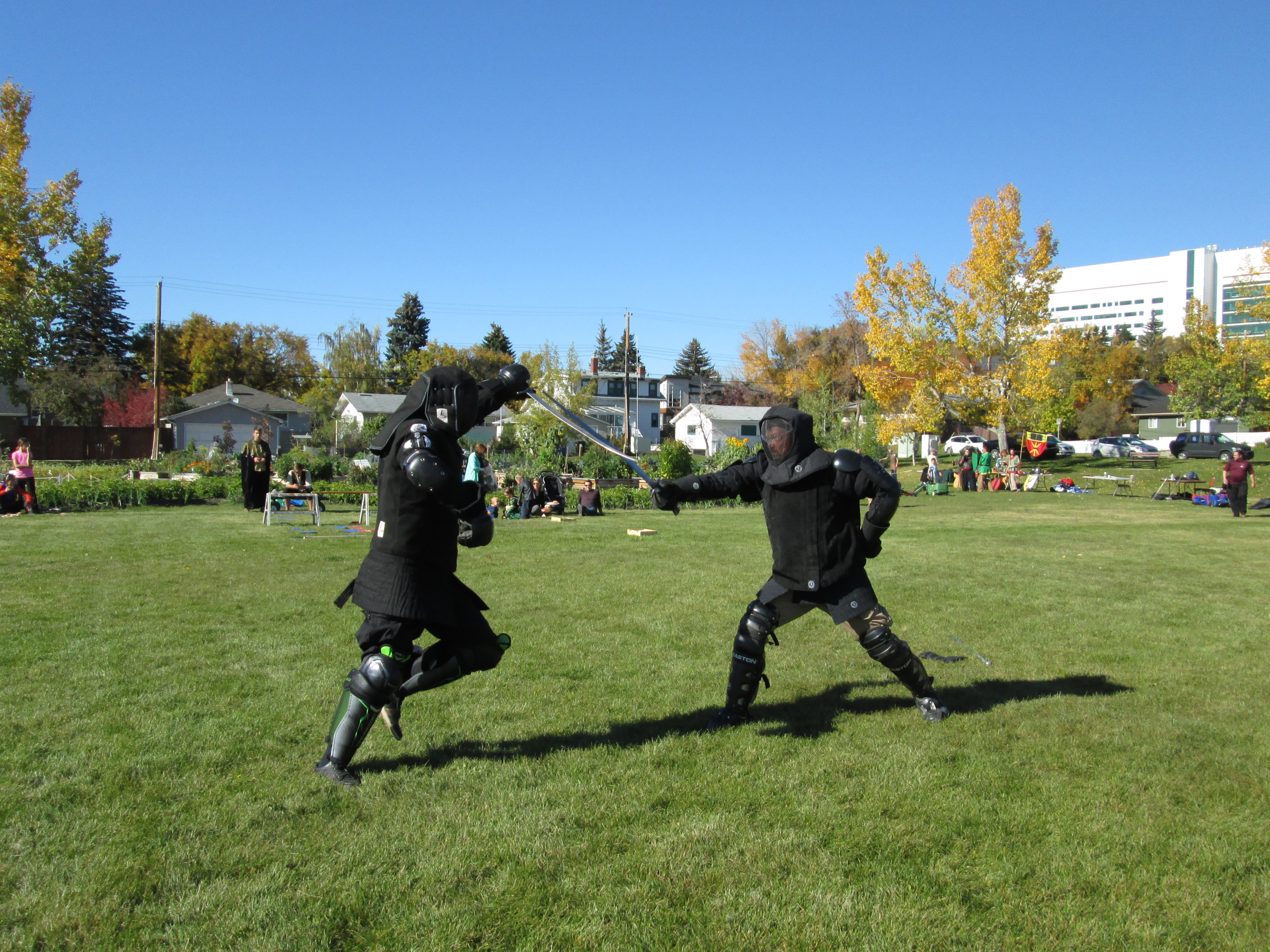
Chad Hazzard's heavy fighters at the Grand Opening in Parkdale

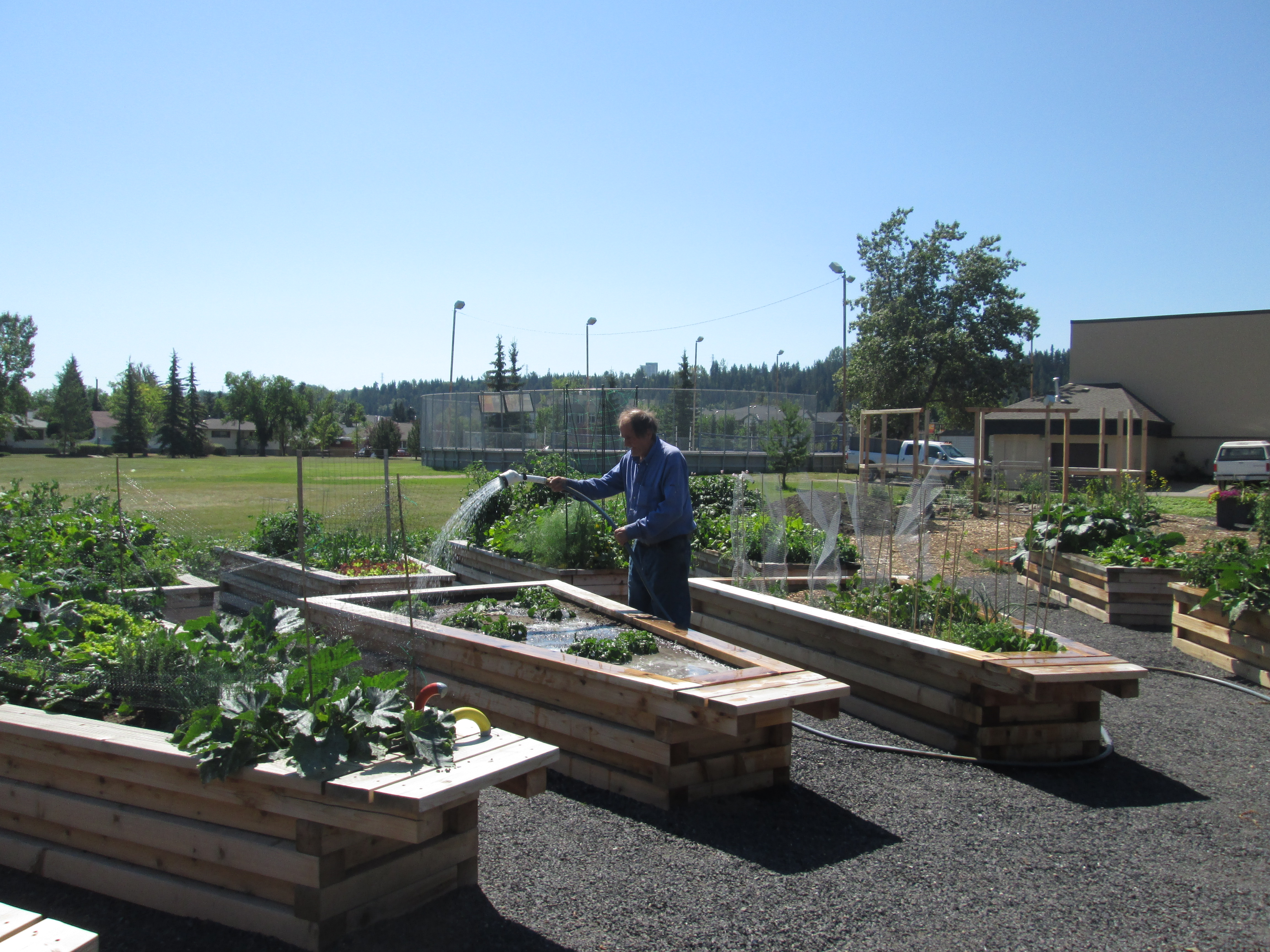
Heritage farmer David Wiesbeck watering raised beds in Parkdale Community Garden

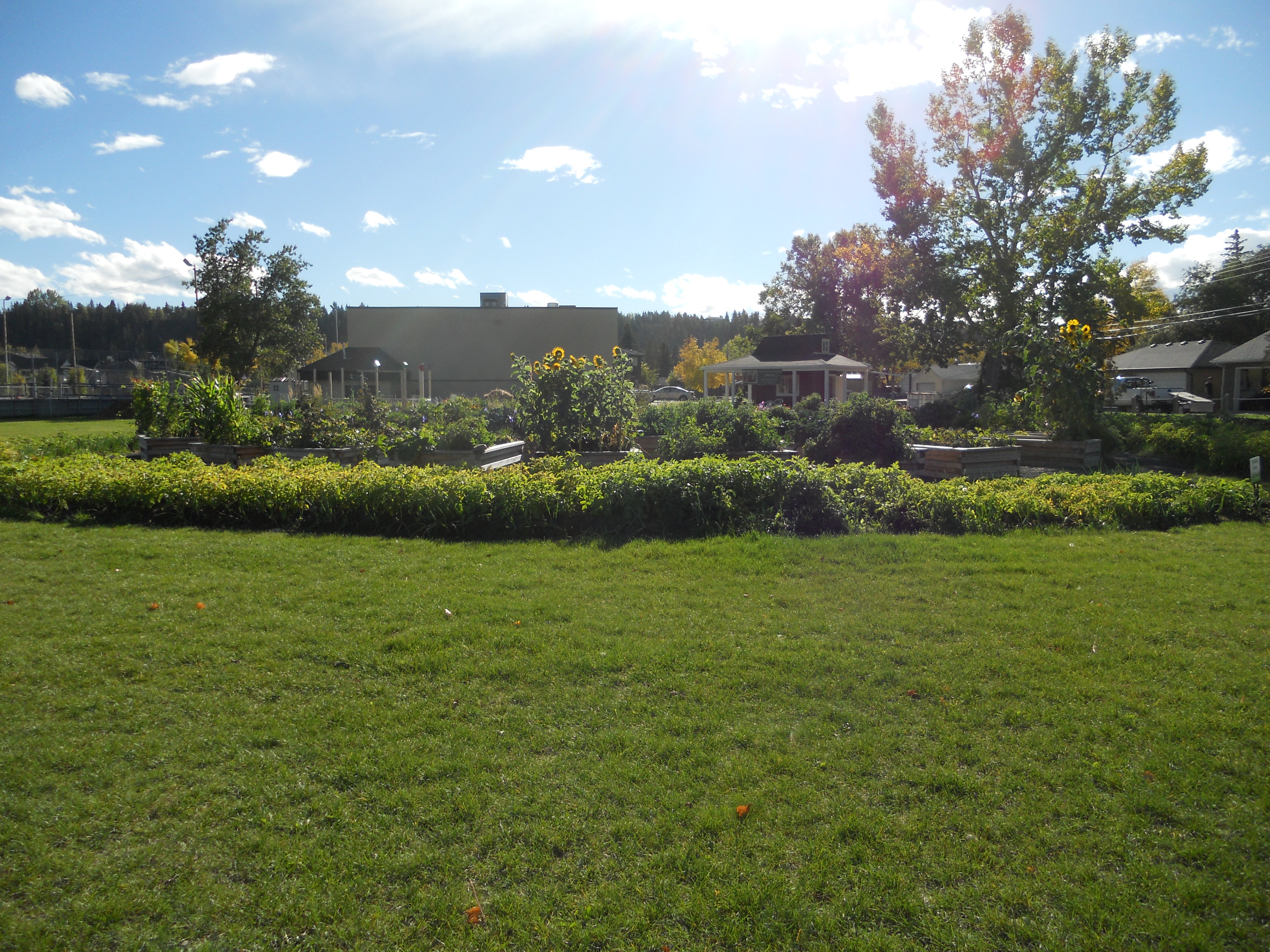
Potatoes were planted around raised garden beds in Parkdale community garden in Calgary

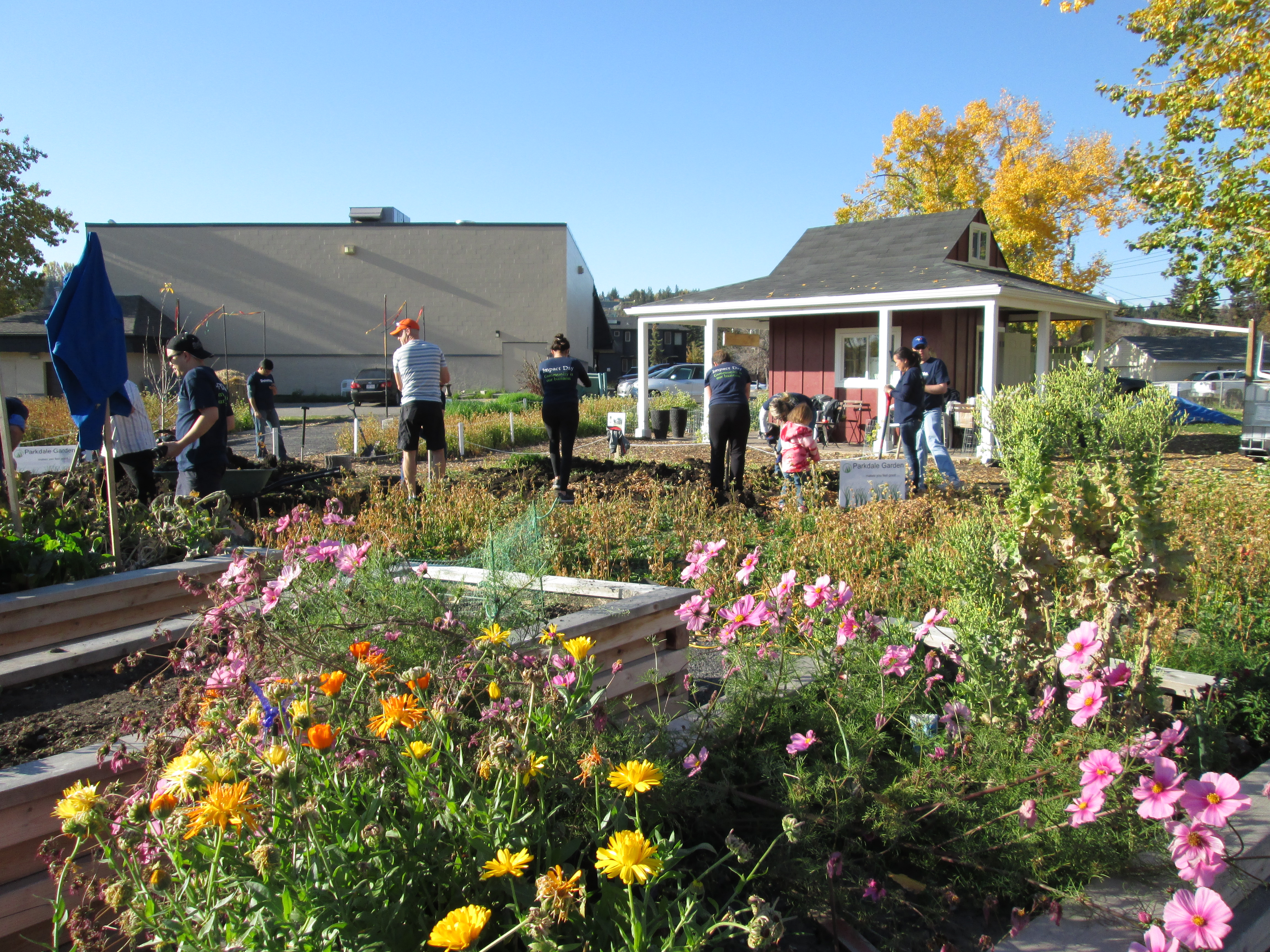
Parkdale Garden volunteer day

The Bow River "riverfront runs the length of the entire Parkdale community and is the most significant green space in the community."

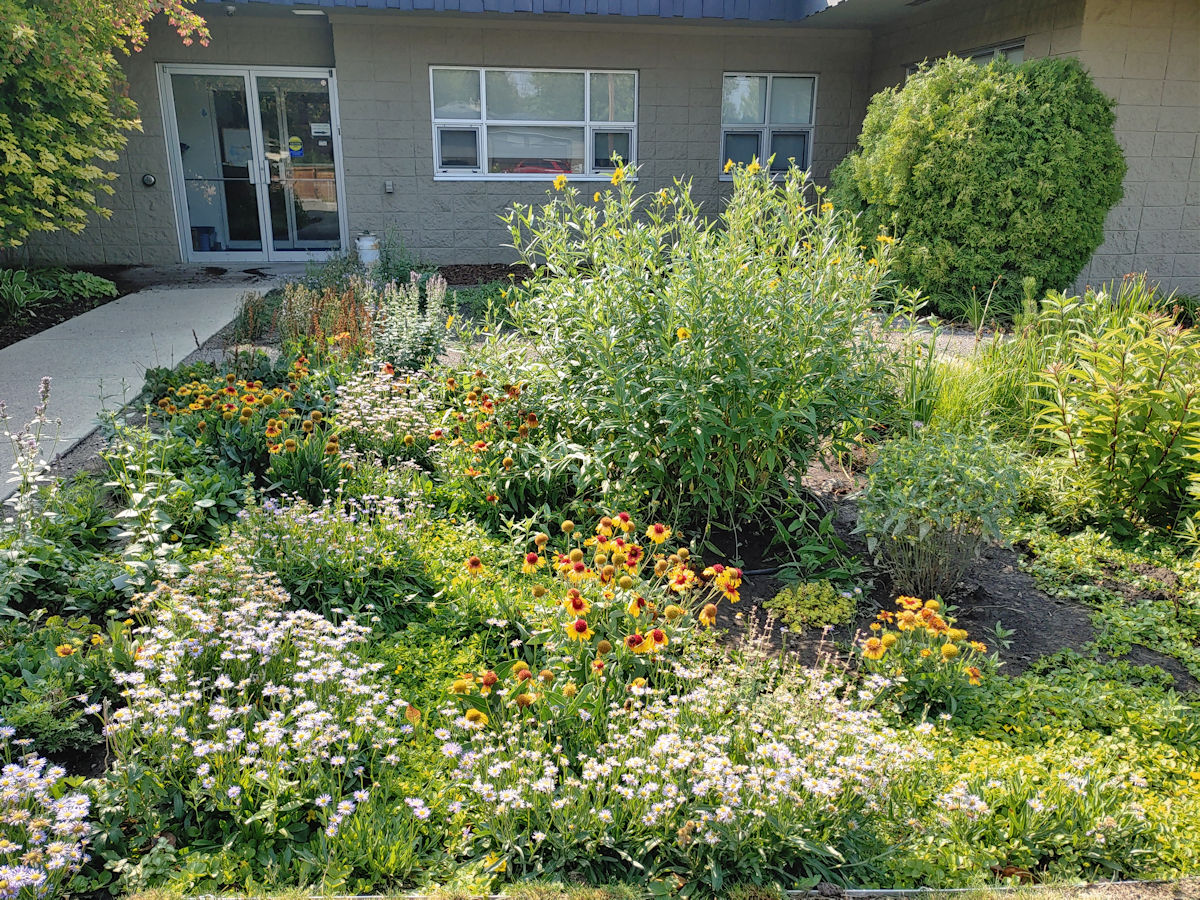
Low Impact Development rain garden in Calgary, Alberta harvesting rainwater from roof

By the 1950s city planners had included recreational green space in plans for Parkdale land use. The land set aside is where the Parkdale Community Association building, Parkdale Community Centre Playground — a baseball diamond, rink and the Parkdale Garden and Gathering Place is now located. The Garden hosted events such as the Medieval Fair which was also the Grand Opening of the community garden in September 2015. In 2021, a rain garden was constructed to harvest rainwater from the Parkdale community's buildings.

The Parkdale/West Hillhurst Helicopter Playground, located on 5th Avenue and 27th St. NW, has 2 large play structures with 2 slides, a Helicopter climber, dinosaur climber, a teeter-totter. There is a large grassy area for flying kites and a baseball diamond.

== Parkdale Community Association ==
Parkdale Community Association publishes a Community Newsletter, has a Parkdale Community Garden and Gathering Space, Parkdale Farmers Market and a Planning and development subcommittee.

== Demographics ==
In the City of Calgary's 2012 municipal census, Parkdale had a population of 2,296 living in 1,020 dwellings compared to 2317 in the 2011 census. With a land area of 1.1 km^{2} (0.42 sq mi), it had a population density of 2,090/km^{2} (5,410/sq mi) in 2012.

There are 305 residents in Parkdale who are over 85 years old. Seventy-five per cent of Parkdale residents are younger than 64 compared to 90% in Calgary as whole; 26% of Parkdale residents are 65 years and older compared to 10% in Calgary as whole.

Of the residents 15 speak neither French or English; 11% are bilingual and 5 residents primarily speak French at home. In 2011 93% of Parkdale residents spoke English most often at home compared to 79% in Calgary as a whole and 115 of Parkdale residents representing 6% of the population, spoke another language besides French of English most often at home: 25 spoke Spanish, 10 spoke German, 10 spoke Korean, 10 spoke Persian and 10 spoke Tagalog. In Calgary as a whole 79% of the population speak English as the primary language at home, 1% speak French and 16% another language.

According to the 2011 census 17% of residents were immigrants compared to 13.8% in 2000. In the city of Calgary 28% of the population were immigrants according to the 2011 census. There are 40 residents with aboriginal identity and 320 who are of a visible minority.

== Socio-economic information ==
According to the 2011 short-form census the median total household income (before tax) in Parkdale was $71,335, up from $59,209 in 2000. There are 495 Parkdale households in the top decile of adjusted after-tax family income in 2010 which is 26% of Parkdale's population compared to 20% in Calgary and 10% in Canada. In 2004 there were 13.5% low income residents living in the neighbourhood. By 2012 "Calgary had the highest median total family income (before tax) of all census metropolitan areas (CMAs) in 2012 at $98,300, according to data derived from personal income tax returns."

Thirty two per cent of households in Parkdale spent 30% or more of total income on shelter in 2010. Housing is considered to be affordable if it is less than 30%.

== Housing ==
The average home selling price increased by 216.79% from a price of $206,109 in 2000 to $652,931 in 2012. Parkdale was one of ten communities in Calgary with the largest spikes in the price of homes. Parkdale and the other nine communities are in areas surrounding the downtown and within the core itself with access to transit, work and the downtown. Parkdale includes sections of the Bow River Pathway System and Parkdale Boulevard and is near Shaganappi and Crowchild Trails.

As of 2014 the population of Parkdale was 2,341 in 933 dwellings all of which were occupied. Of these 48% were single family homes and 57% of the dwellings were occupied by the owners. Sixty two per cent of residents were between the ages of 20–64 years.

In 2011 in Parkdale 37% of dwellings are single detached houses compared to 59% in Calgary as a whole.

Dwelling types in Parkdale 2014
type	number	percentage
single-family	449	48%
duplex	147	16%
apartment	161	17%
townhouse	45	5%
converted structure	108	12%

In 2004 a proportion of 39.3% of the buildings were condominiums or apartments, and 39.6% of the housing was used for renting.

== Parkdale Plaza ==
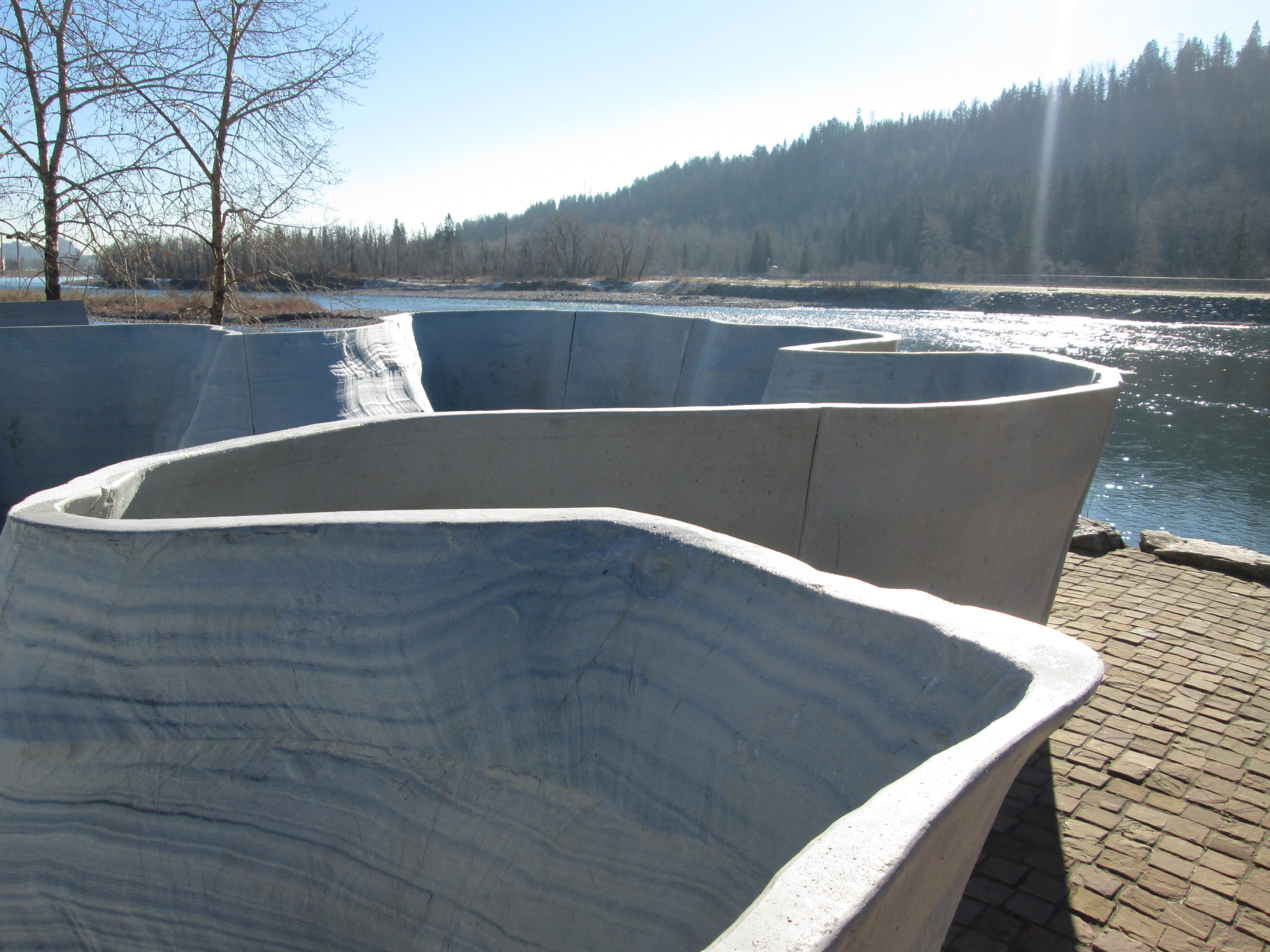
Outfall, 2015

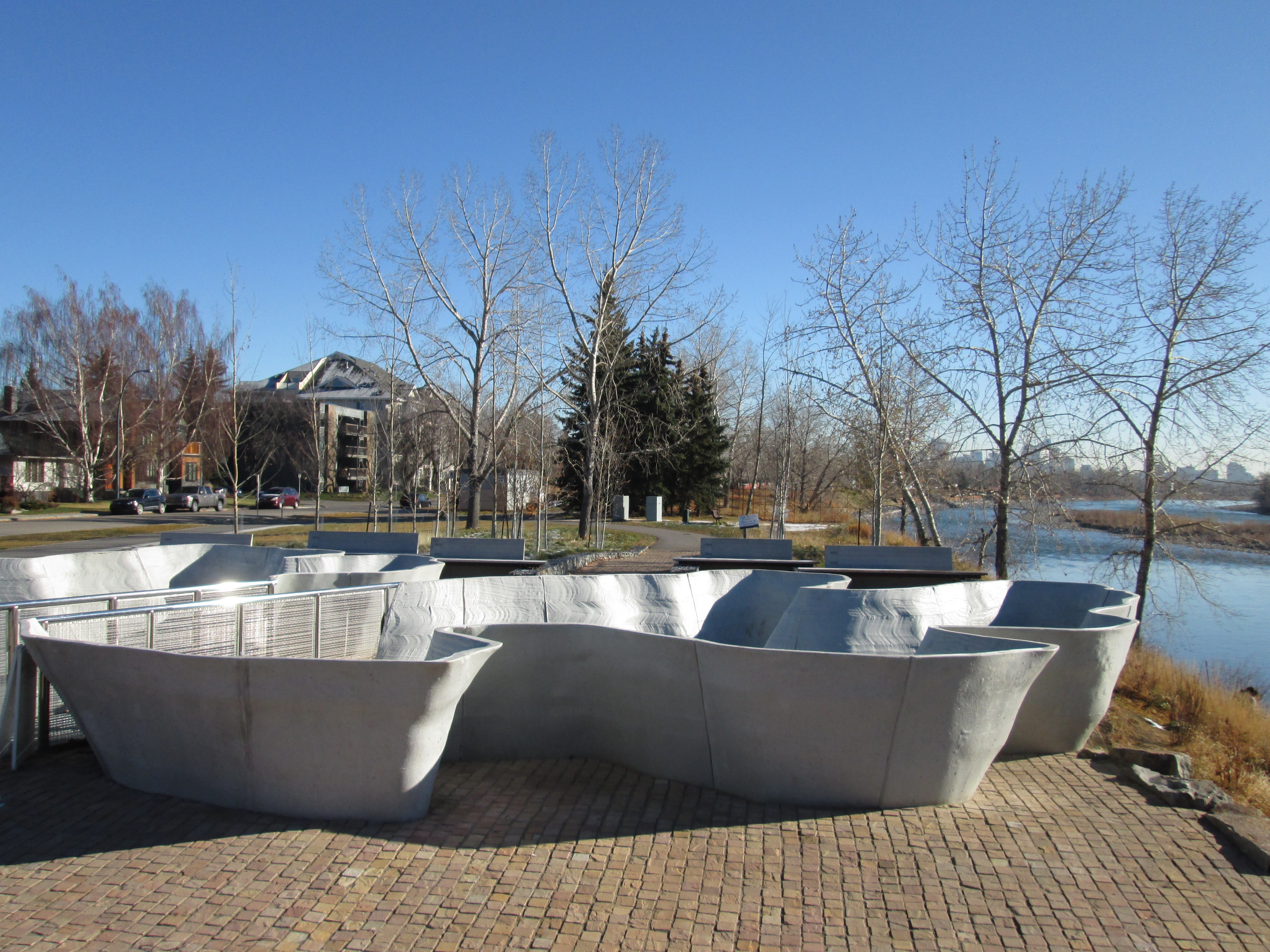
with Bow River and downtown Calgary towers in the distance

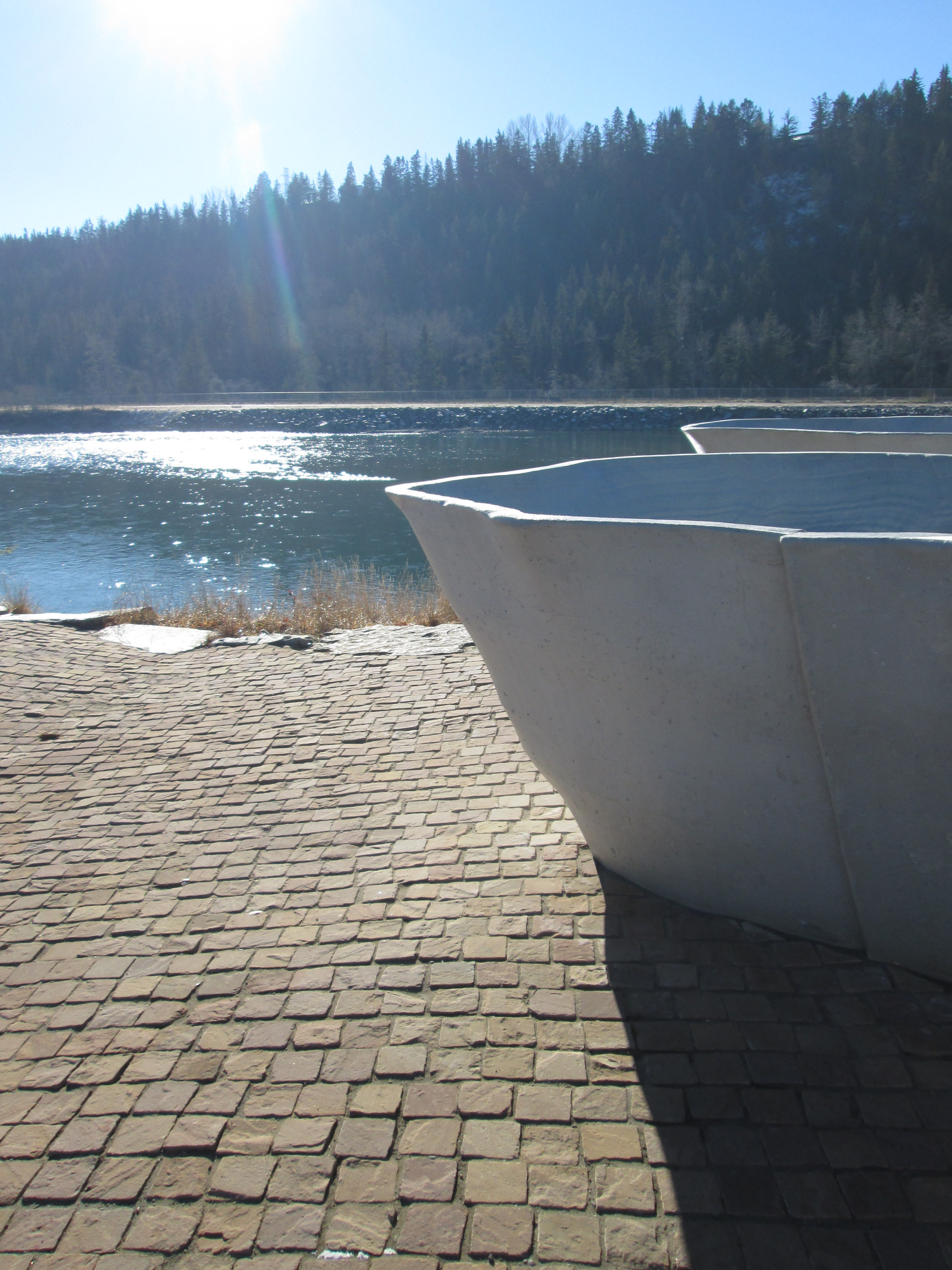
Brian Tolle Studio

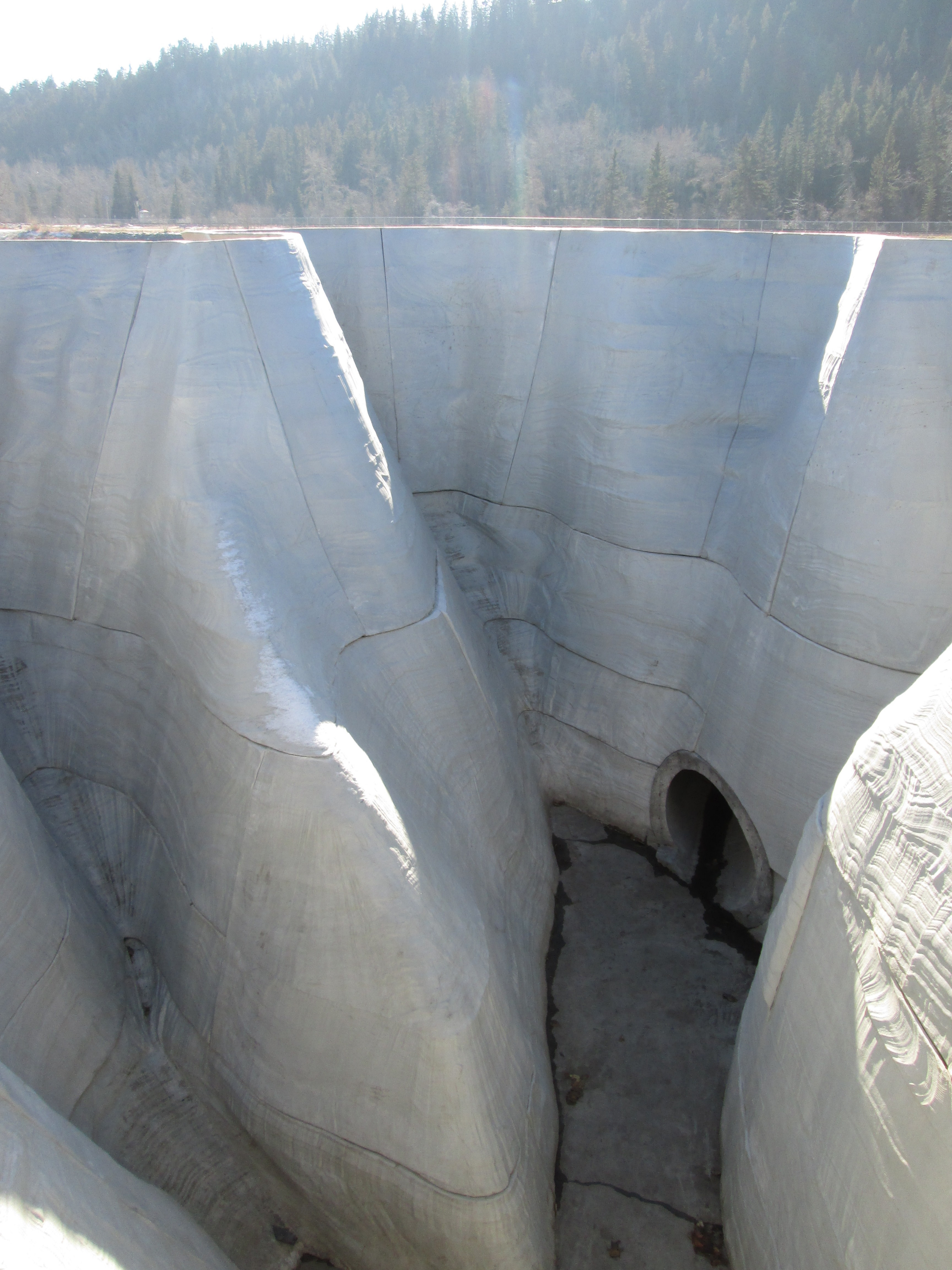
The inverted mountain acts as a functional retention pond.

"A segment of the City's stormwater system that has been transformed into an inverted replica of Mount Peechee, memorializes the glacial origins of the Bow River. As we watch stormwater travel from the community, through the sculpture and into the Bow, we visualize the journey of the river and gain insight into the impact our actions have on its health. Together, Outflow and the surrounding Parkdale Plaza highlight the delicate balance between our natural watershed and our built environment."

— Signage at Parkdale Plaza 2015

In 2009 the City of Calgary began plans for the Parkdale Plaza which opened in 2014 on the Bow River trail at the end of 34A St. NW. The Plaza offers views of the Douglas Fir Trail and Edworthy Park to the south and Calgary's iconic cluster of downtown high rises to the east. It is situated at the outfall of the city's underground stormwater infrastructure that empties into the Bow River. In 2007 Calgary founded the Utilities and Environmental Protection (UEP) Public Art Plan, and this specific site was identified as a possible ceremonial site in the city's Landscape of Memory plan and a 'place-making' opportunity in the Outfalls Project, a significant project in the Calgary's public art plan to highlight its utility infrastructure through art. The city's storm drainage system helps prevent flooding by "diverting rain and snowmelt into the nearest river or creek through curbside drains and underground pipes" and slows down the flow through retention ponds then finally empties into the rivers through outfalls.

A site-specific integrated horizontal sculpture "Outfall" cast from high-performance Ductal™ concrete designed by New York sculptor Brian Tolle, - who worked "close collaboration with the landscape architecture firm of marc boutin architectural collaborative inc." - is an inverted, day-lighted, computer-generated scale-model of Mount Peechee north of Canmore, Alberta which acts as a functional retention pond to hold excess water during heavy rainstorms while providing a platform so visitors can view the movement of the water. According to a favourable 2002 New York Times review of Tolle's Irish Hunger Memorial in Battery Park City, Tolle's populist postmodern art "exemplifies contemporary art's ability to meet the public's need for meaningful monuments with an appropriateness that may surprise both advocates and opponents of the new."

== Prehistory ==
Just to the west of Parkdale, two buried campsites dating back to dated to 4600 and 4000 BP were uncovered during the construction of McKay Towers in Point McKay, along with more recent tipi rings. There were also two historic sites, a possible Métis encampment and the evidence of an early Chinese settler. Archaeologist Michael Wilson undertook investigations of these sites in 1977 and 1978. In 1973 the province of Alberta passed the Historical Resources Act, prior to which developers were not required to hire archaeologists to survey tracts of land slated for development so there is probability of other archaeological sites in Parkdale that were not investigated. It has been suggested that across the river from "outfall" is a buffalo jump.

== See also ==
- List of neighbourhoods in Calgary
