= Brewster Productions =

Concert production and promotion company

- Origin: Plymouth, Massachusetts, United States
- Genres: Folk, indie rock, alternative, punk, alt-country, reggae, ska, jam band, Americana, blues.
- Years active: 2007–present
- Website: http://www.brewsterproductions.com

Brewster Productions is a concert production and promotion company based in Plymouth, Massachusetts, USA. It is the producer of the Acoustic Nights Summer Concert Series and the Plymouth Independent Music Festival.

The Acoustic Nights Summer Concert Series is presented in association with the Plymouth Antiquarian Society.

== History ==
Brewster Productions was founded in 2007 and is owned by Scott McEwen, Jon Dorn and Andrew Carleen.
