= Sacrifice Rock =

Coordinates: 41°54′08″N 70°35′47″W

Sacrifice Rock is a historic Wampanoag site in Plymouth, Massachusetts in the Pine Hills region, located in the northern section of The Pinehills residential project on Old Sandwich Road. The site is owned by the Plymouth Antiquarian Society. In 1928, Sacrifice Rock was given to the Antiquarian Society by Abbott A. Raymond. In 1940, cement posts were erected to mark the site. A commemorative stone marker was added about 1960. The marker was replaced by a metal plaque in 1991.

The name of the rock reflects the practice of the Wampanoag of placing sticks and branches on the rock when leaving the area, known traditionally as Patuxet.
