= Plymouth Antiquarian House =

Historic house in Massachusetts, United States

- U.S. National Register of Historic Places
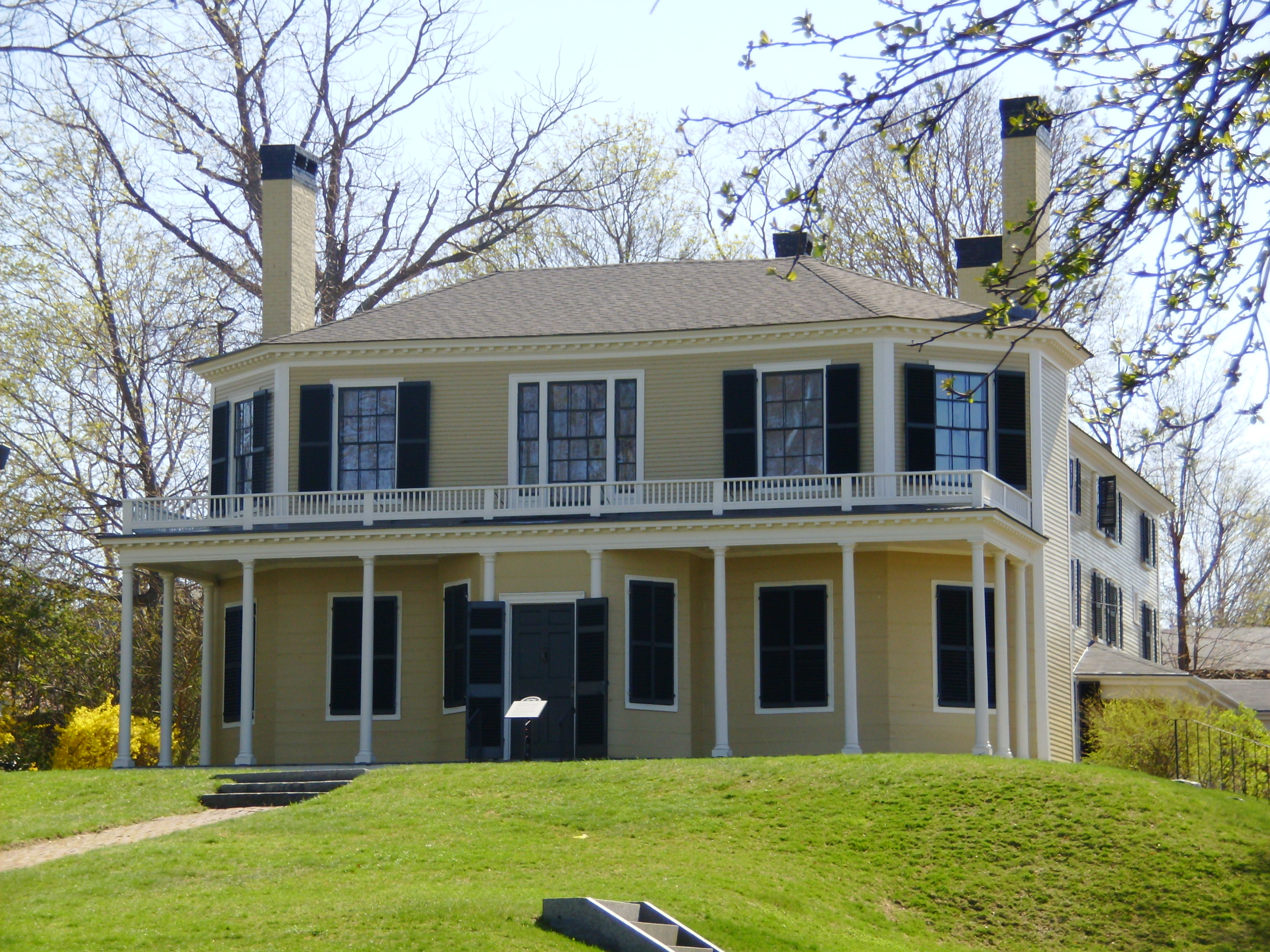

- Location within Massachusetts Location within the United States
- Location: 126 Water Street, Plymouth, Massachusetts
- Coordinates: 41°57′37″N 70°40′4″W
- Built: 1809
- Architectural style: Federal
- NRHP reference No.: 74002034
- Added to NRHP: December 27, 1974

The Plymouth Antiquarian House (also known as Hedge House or "Hammatt House") is an historic house museum in Plymouth, Massachusetts owned by the Plymouth Antiquarian Society.

The house was built in 1809 for William Hammatt, a New England sea captain. The Hedges, a family of entrepreneurs, purchased the house in 1830 and lived there until 1919. The house was originally located on Court Street but was moved to Water Street by the Antiquarian Society in 1919. It is open during the summer months. The house was added to the National Register of Historic Places in 1974.

== See also ==
- National Register of Historic Places listings in Plymouth County, Massachusetts
