= Plymouth Antiquarian Society =

Harlow Old Fort House, ca. 1677 is alleged to have been constructed from the timbers of the Pilgrims' fort

The Plymouth Antiquarian Society is a historical organization in Plymouth, Massachusetts. The Society, founded in 1919, owns and maintains the Harlow Old Fort House, the Spooner House, the Hedge House, and an ancient Native American site, Sacrifice Rock.

== See also ==
- List of Antiquarian Societies
- List of historical societies in Massachusetts
