= Elmer Harlow House =

Historic house in Oregon, United States

- U.S. National Register of Historic Places
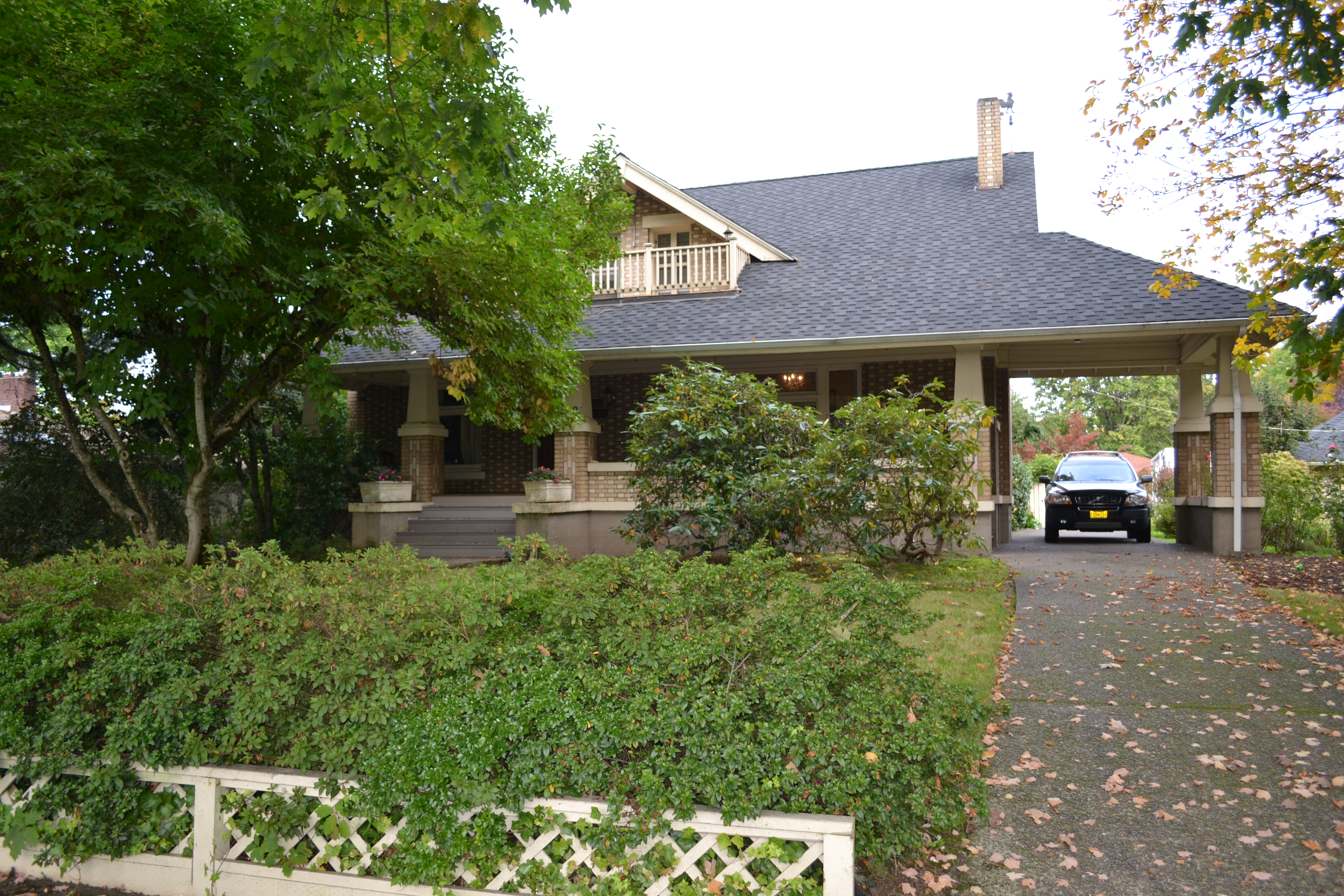
- The Harlow House in 2011

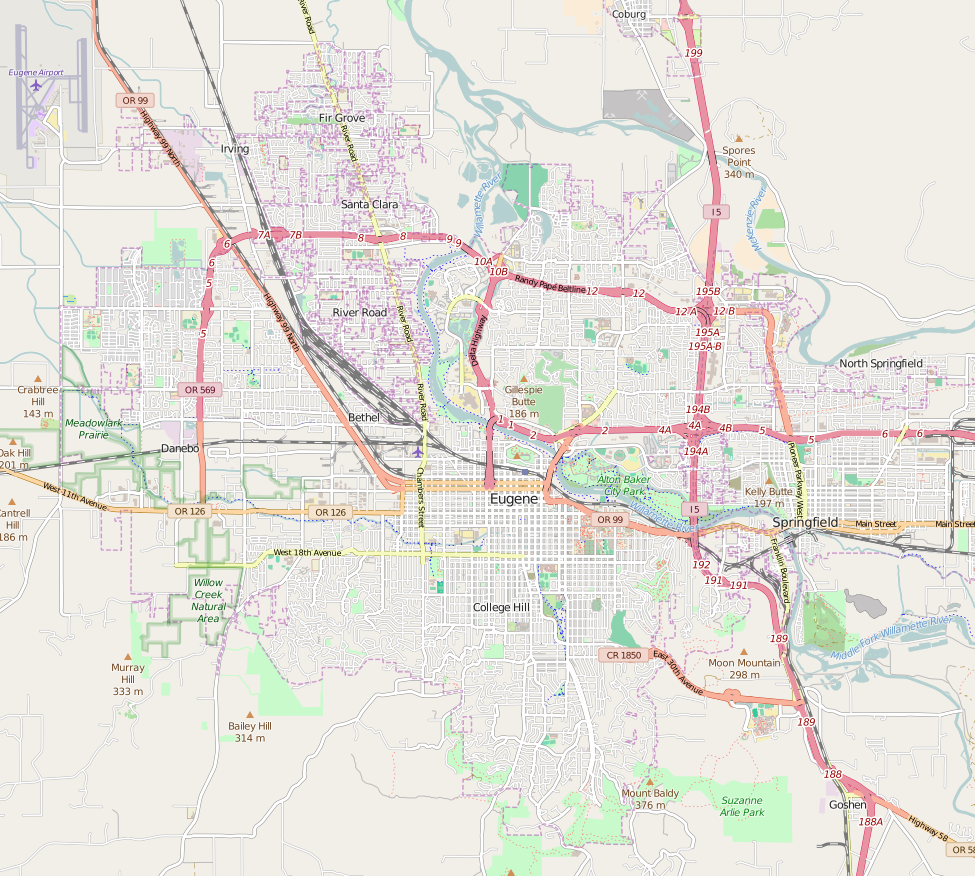
- Location within Eugene OR Location within Oregon
- Location: 2991 Harlow Road; Eugene, Oregon
- Coordinates: 44°04′12″N 123°03′49″W
- Area: 0.5 acres (0.20 ha)
- Built: 1922
- Architectural style: Craftsman bungalow
- NRHP reference No.: 80003334
- Added to NRHP: February 12, 1980

The Elmer Harlow House is a historic residence in Eugene, Oregon, United States. Built in 1922, it is important as a representative example of the bungalow style promoted by The Craftsman magazine in the early decades of the 20th century. It is especially notable for the fine interior and exterior detailing, including in woodwork and windows. The architect is unknown, and certain features of the design suggest that a professional architect was not directly involved with the construction; it is possible that the design was derived from a plan book or The Craftsman itself. Although the house's use of brick facing is not usual for Craftsman design, the use of two-tone Flemish bond masonry emphasizes the refined and careful construction.

The house was listed on the National Register of Historic Places in 1980.

== See also ==
- National Register of Historic Places listings in Lane County, Oregon
