= Strawberry box house =

Style of homes built in Canada

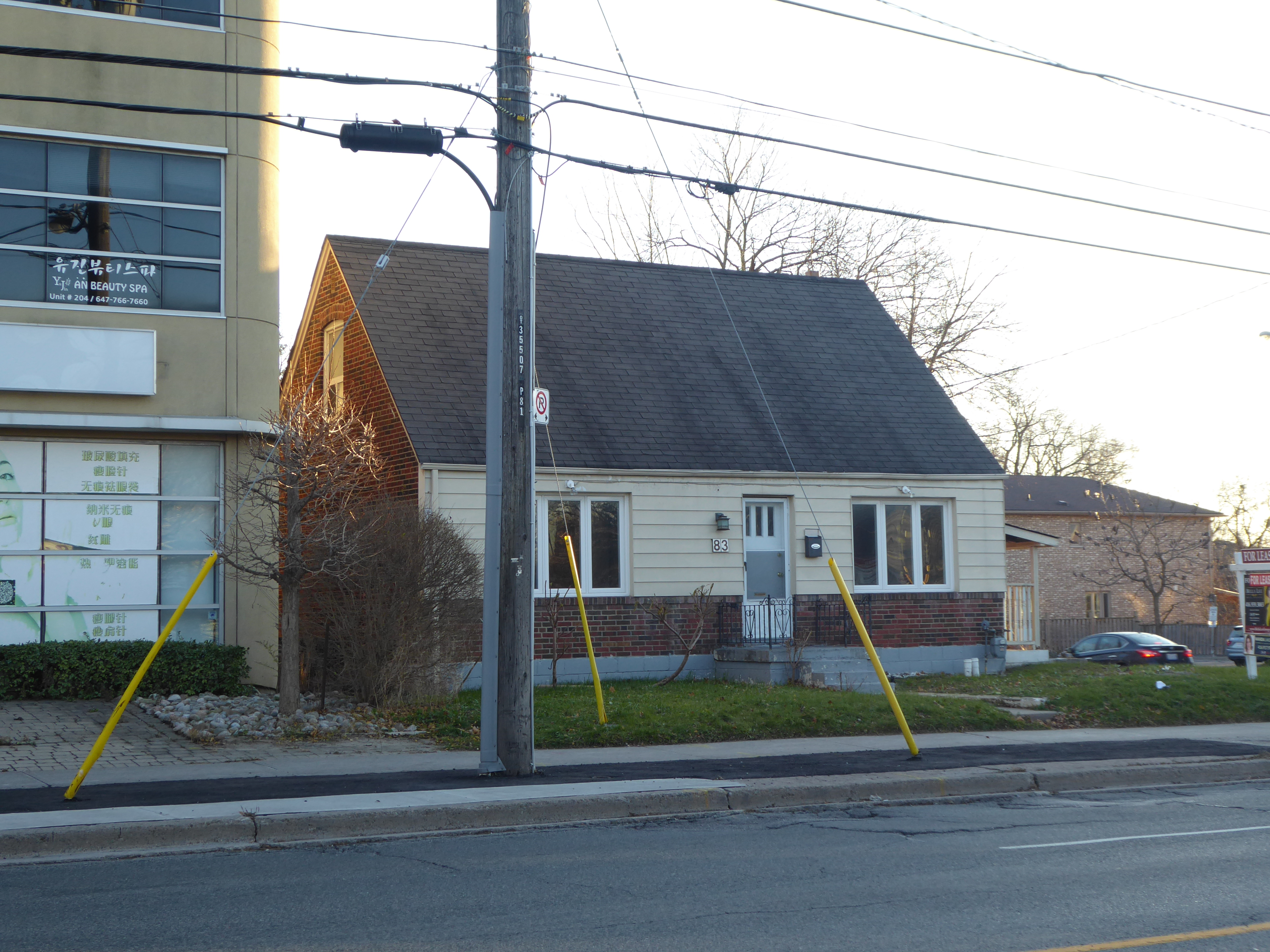
A Victory House on Finch Avenue West in Willowdale, Toronto, which was part of a 140-home development in c.1950, only 32 of which remain in 2022.

In Canada, a strawberry box house is a house, built during World War II and into the 1950s to 1960s, in a style that uses a square or rectangular foundation. The style gets its name from the similarity to boxes used to hold strawberries. This style has also been called the "Simplified Cape Cod", or "Victory House" in the case of certain government advertisements. They are present in other areas such as United States, especially Massachusetts. Tell-tale characteristics include slight overhang of the front roof over the facade, 2 windows in the front (similar to a symmetrical half Cape Cod (house)), no dormers, and usually no shutters on the windows. There can be a small front porch or no porch.

== History ==
During World War II, homes known as Victory Housing were built in suburbs in several Canadian cities and towns, including Toronto, Montreal, Ottawa and Halifax to provide housing for workers in factories supplying items for World War II. Many homes were needed for workers who relocated to work in new or expanded shipyards to build ships for Canada's merchant marine. Outside Toronto, large projects include North Vancouver (683), and Pictou, Nova Scotia (400 - Victory Heights) and by the middle of 1943, nearly 16,000 houses had been constructed by Wartime Housing Limited. this number had risen to 38,000 by 1947 when Wartime Housing Limited was wound down, having been replaced by Central Mortgage and Housing.

Due to the large demand for new housing to accommodate workers, and later veterans, the houses were designed to be sturdy but economic. Victory Housing employed a cheap and simple design. After the war, many of these houses were maintained (and many remain into the twenty-first century), but newer versions improved on the basic format. Much of the small building was prefabricated and then shipped to the sites to be constructed. This resulted in very homogenous and uniform developments that sprung up in almost every major city in Canada during the war and post-war periods. The houses were often one-and-a-half stories tall with gabled roofs and clapboard siding. The streets of these instant neighbourhoods were often given names that recalled their place in the time following the war, such as Victory or Churchill.

The typical style was either a detached bungalow or a two-storey semi-detached. Depending on the locale, the facade may have been plain wood or brick, with entrances at the front and sides.

== Architecture ==
Drawing Based on floor plan from the Canada Mortgage and Housing Corporation books

The style of a Strawberry Box is also referred to as the Simplified Cape Cod because it shares many of the same features in a type that is more compact. The original inspiration dates back to the 1700s, and was a common colonial style beginning in the Massachusetts and Connecticut areas before spreading throughout the greater New England area. The gabled roof has a steep pitch, typical to many New England styles and allowing for an additional half-storey space. Despite evidence of the small second floor on plans, most houses do not seem to show outward signs of rooms being present on the second floor, such as dormer windows. Instead, it was more typical to have windows on the sides to illuminate the upper half-storey, which is holding with the Cape Cod tradition. Contrary to the Cape Cod tradition is that most of the plans for Victory Houses had chimneys to one side, while the original Cape Cod style almost exclusively had central chimneys.

Porches were atypical to the style, but some houses have small awning roofs over their front doors.

== Veteran's Land Act ==
A reason this small house type was so abundant was because of the Veterans' Land Act of 1942, which was initiated by the Canadian Government to provide housing for returning veterans and their families. The act was designed to avoid the disaster of an earlier act in 1919, the Soldier Settlement Act, which failed to meet the needs of returning soldiers, this act put into place measures to build or finance housing for those returning from war. The main objective was to get people working, specifically by getting them land to farm in order to provide for themselves. In this way the houses ended up being very small to allow for a large portion of the property to remain open for potential gardening.

== Toronto ==
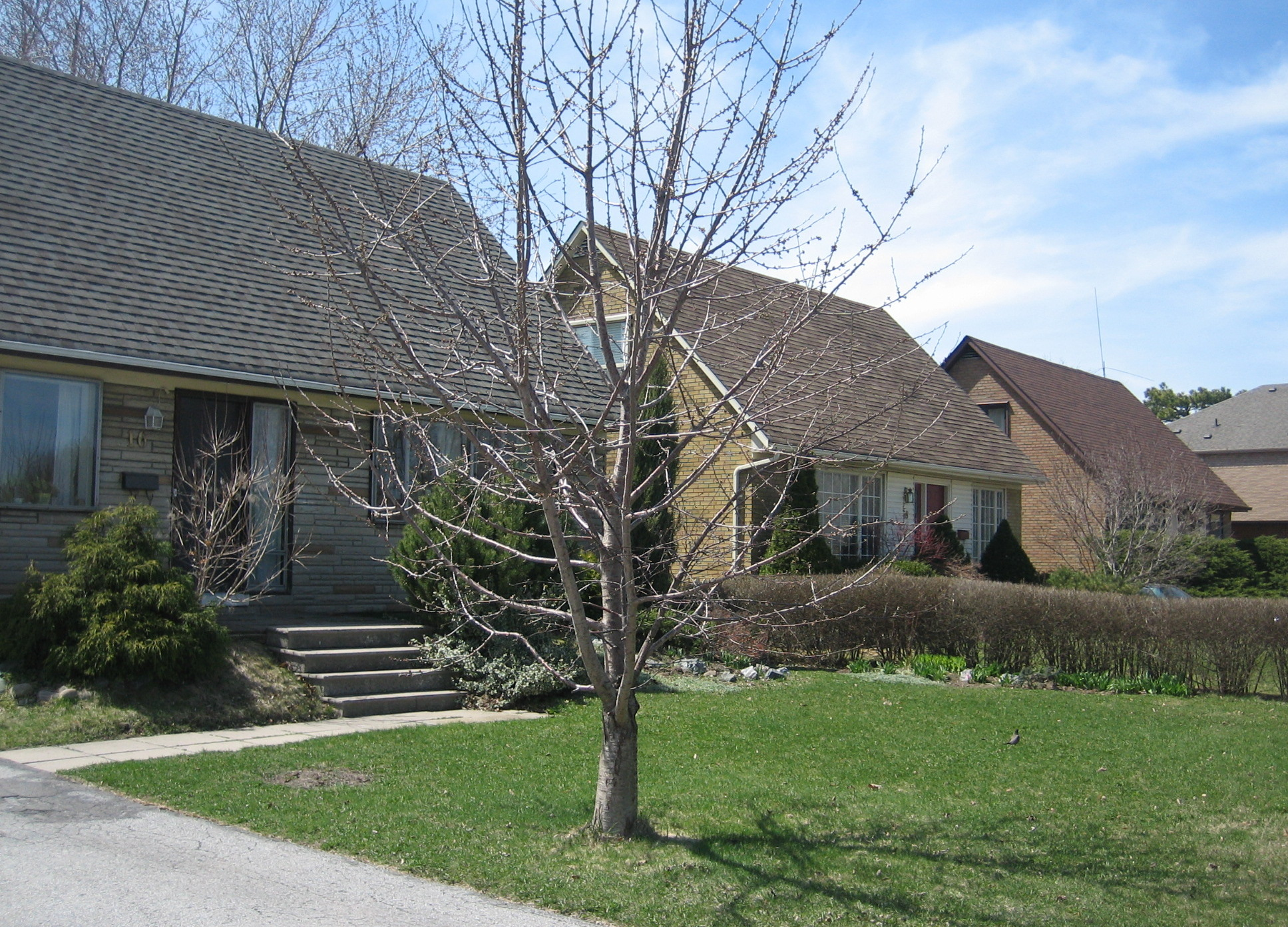
Strawberry box houses in Don Mills, a suburban neighbourhood in North York, Toronto. Note the slight overhang of the roof over the facade.

In Toronto, the Strawberry Box style may be found throughout North York, south Scarborough (south of Highway 401) and north Etobicoke (north of Highway 401).

The strawberry box house-type was largely used in Canadian communities for its quick mass construction used to create entire neighbourhoods. Examples exist in the area of Queensway Park, Toronto. In this example of a suburban neighbourhood there are roughly 200 homes built on winding streets, all originally in the small strawberry box style. They were built to be small homes for workers surrounding a park using the simple plans the government had released in 1945 as part of the Wartime Housing Corporation. This is just a small example of a situation that repeated around other major Canadian cities during the period following WWII.

== Cora Brown ==
Another example of the Victory House is a location in British Columbia on the Southwest corner of Canada, demonstrating the extent of the style's popularity. This subdivision was built in 1946 on Sea Island in Richmond, and was called the Cora Brown Subdivision. Most of the houses here were built under the guidance of the Veteran's Land Act, beginning with a cluster of about fifty houses that were small, only two bedrooms, but sat on almost an acre of land. The neighbourhood was small and tight, an isolated community, but it was a community of families. The husbands would travel to Vancouver usually for work, and women would keep home. The community had few amenities. A bridge connected the island to the mainland where residents would go for groceries and children to school. Cora Brown was an area built almost entirely of the small one and a half storey houses of the Strawberry Box style, with the occasional custom house.

== Campeau Construction ==
Another proliferator of the one and a half storey simple design was a certain construction company in the Ottawa area. Campeau Construction was one of the largest building firms in Ottawa in the two decades following WWII, responsible for building several neighbourhoods such as Alta Vista, Applewood Acres, Elmvale Acres, Queensway Terrace, and Bel-Air Heights. The dominating style of these communities were the one to one and a half storey homes which marked the Strawberry Box or Simplified Cape Cod style. At the time the style had actually become very popular, and very few two storey homes were constructed. These designs were taken almost directly from the books released by Central Mortgage and Housing Corporation (now called Canada Mortgage and Housing Corporation), which were published from 1940 to 1970 and detailed such designs that could be appropriate for the Canadian landscape. The areas where the houses were constructed had small but wider lots than historically narrower properties. In this way constructing the small one and a half storey Strawberry Box gave the illusion of having a sprawling property with a ranch house.
