= Sgt. William Harlow Family Homestead =

Historic house in Massachusetts, United States

- U.S. National Register of Historic Places
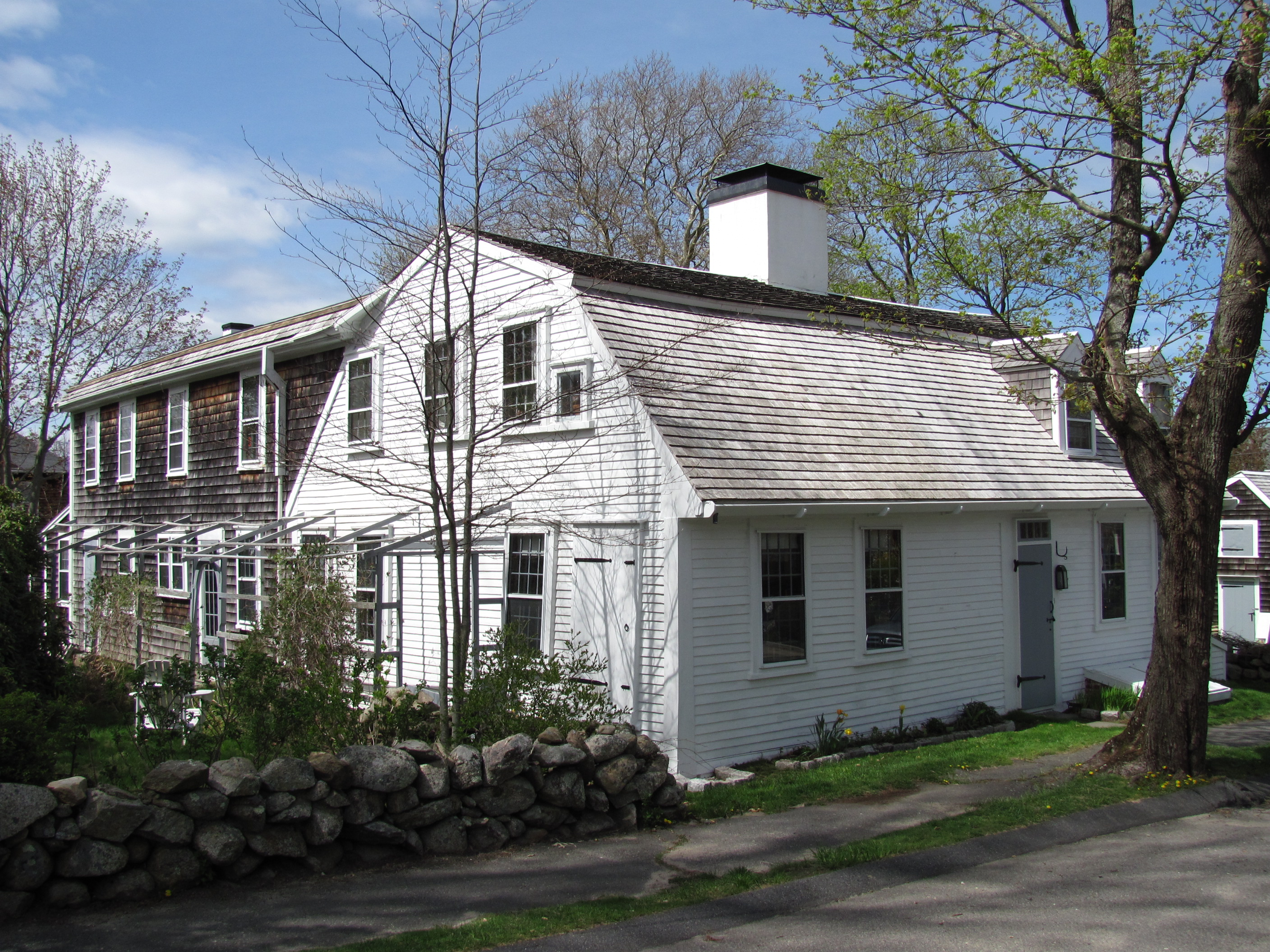
- Sgt. William Harlow Family Homestead

- Location within Massachusetts Location within the United States
- Location: Plymouth, Massachusetts
- Coordinates: 41°57′6″N 70°39′15″W
- Built: 1750
- NRHP reference No.: 82004434
- Added to NRHP: April 15, 1982

The Sgt. Harlow William Family Homestead (also known as the "Harlow-Holmes House" or "Kendall-Holmes House") is a historic house at 8 Winter Street in Plymouth, Massachusetts. The oldest portion of this 1 1/2-story gambrel-roofed Cape house is believed to have been built by Sergeant William Harlow, before he built the nearby Old Harlow Fort House, and is believed to be one of Plymouth's oldest surviving buildings. It is unclear from the architectural evidence whether the original structure was a single cell (three bays) or full width (five bays); the asymmetry of the front facade suggests it was built in stages. The house has a large addition, which was added to the rear in the 19th century.

The house was listed on the National Register of Historic Places in 1982.

== See also ==
- Harlow Old Fort House
- National Register of Historic Places listings in Plymouth County, Massachusetts
