= Harlow Old Fort House =

Historic house in Massachusetts, United States

- U.S. National Register of Historic Places
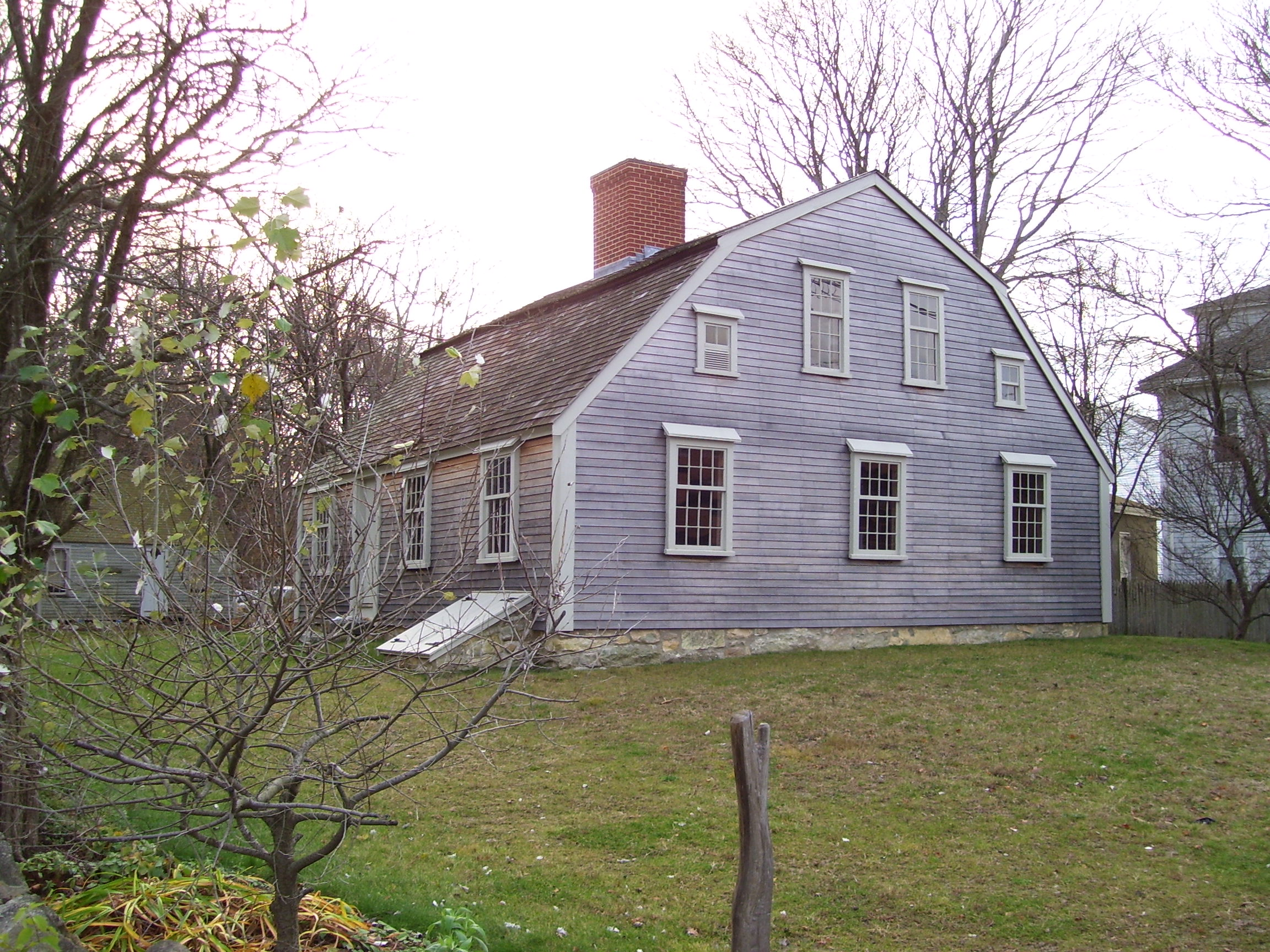
- Harlow Old Fort House in 2009

- Location within Massachusetts Location within the United States
- Location: 119 Sandwich Street, Plymouth, Massachusetts
- Coordinates: 41°57′7″N 70°39′26″W
- Built: c. 1700
- Architectural style: Gambrel Cape
- NRHP reference No.: 74001762
- Added to NRHP: December 27, 1974

The Harlow Old Fort House is a First Period historic house at 119 Sandwich Street in Plymouth, Massachusetts.

== History ==
According to legend, Sergeant William Harlow built the house in 1677 using timbers from the Pilgrims' original fort on Burial Hill, which they had built in 1621–1622. Harlow received permission to use the timbers after the fort was torn down at the end of King Philip's War in 1677. The house was surveyed by an architectural historian in 1996, who determined a construction date of 1700 or later. The Harlow family owned the house for nearly 250 years until the Plymouth Antiquarian Society acquired it and hired Joseph Everett Chandler to restore the house. The Antiquarian Society opened it to the public in 1921. In 1974, the house was added to the National Register of Historic Places. It is still open to the public and features seventeenth-century re-enactors.

== Images ==
Burial Hill Fort, where some of the home's timbers may have come from

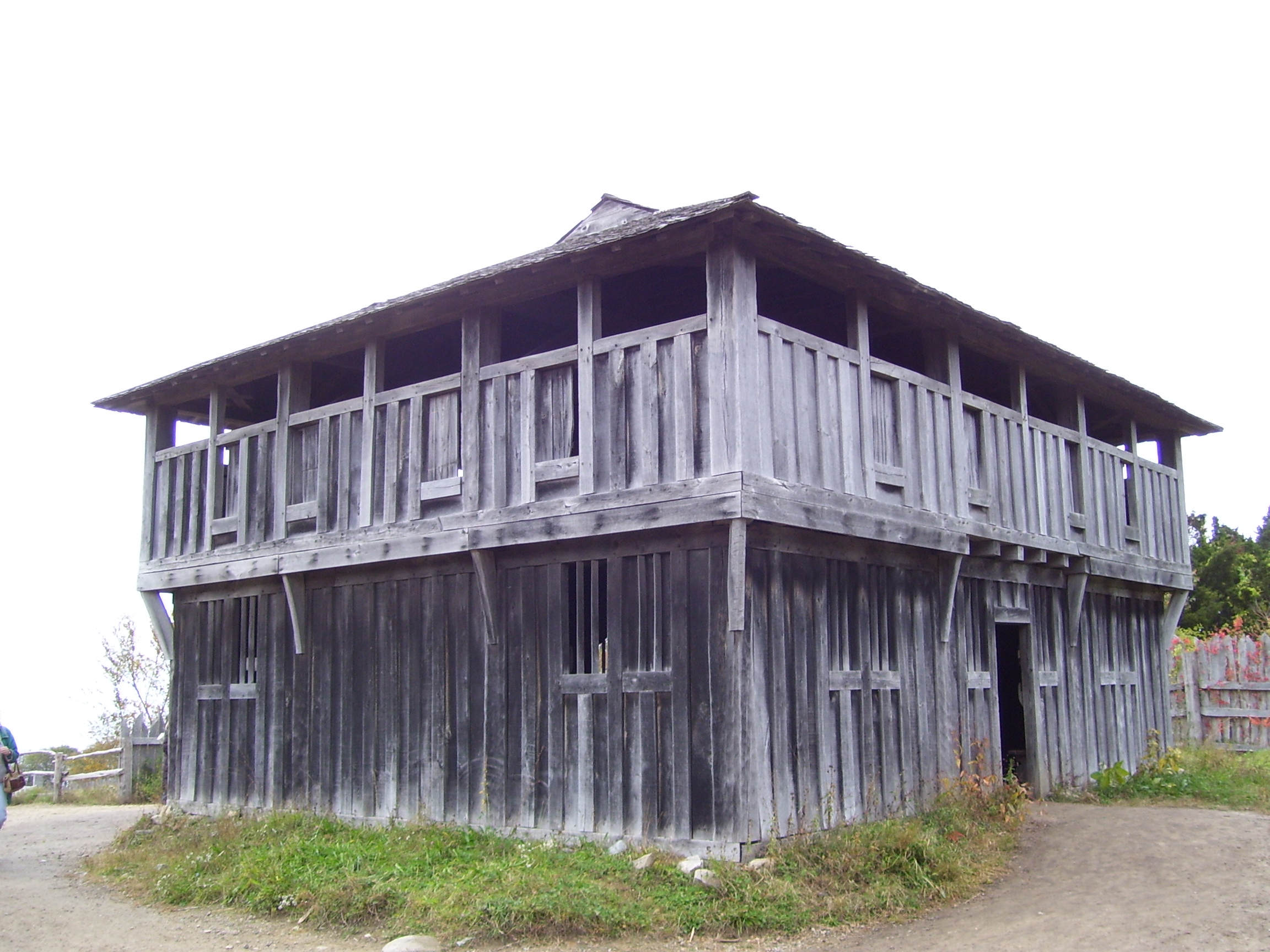
Fort recreation at Plimoth Patuxet

Harlow House

== See also ==
- Plymouth Village Historic District
- Sgt. William Harlow Family Homestead
- National Register of Historic Places listings in Plymouth County, Massachusetts
- List of the oldest buildings in Massachusetts
