= Benjamin Lincoln =

American army officer (1733–1810)

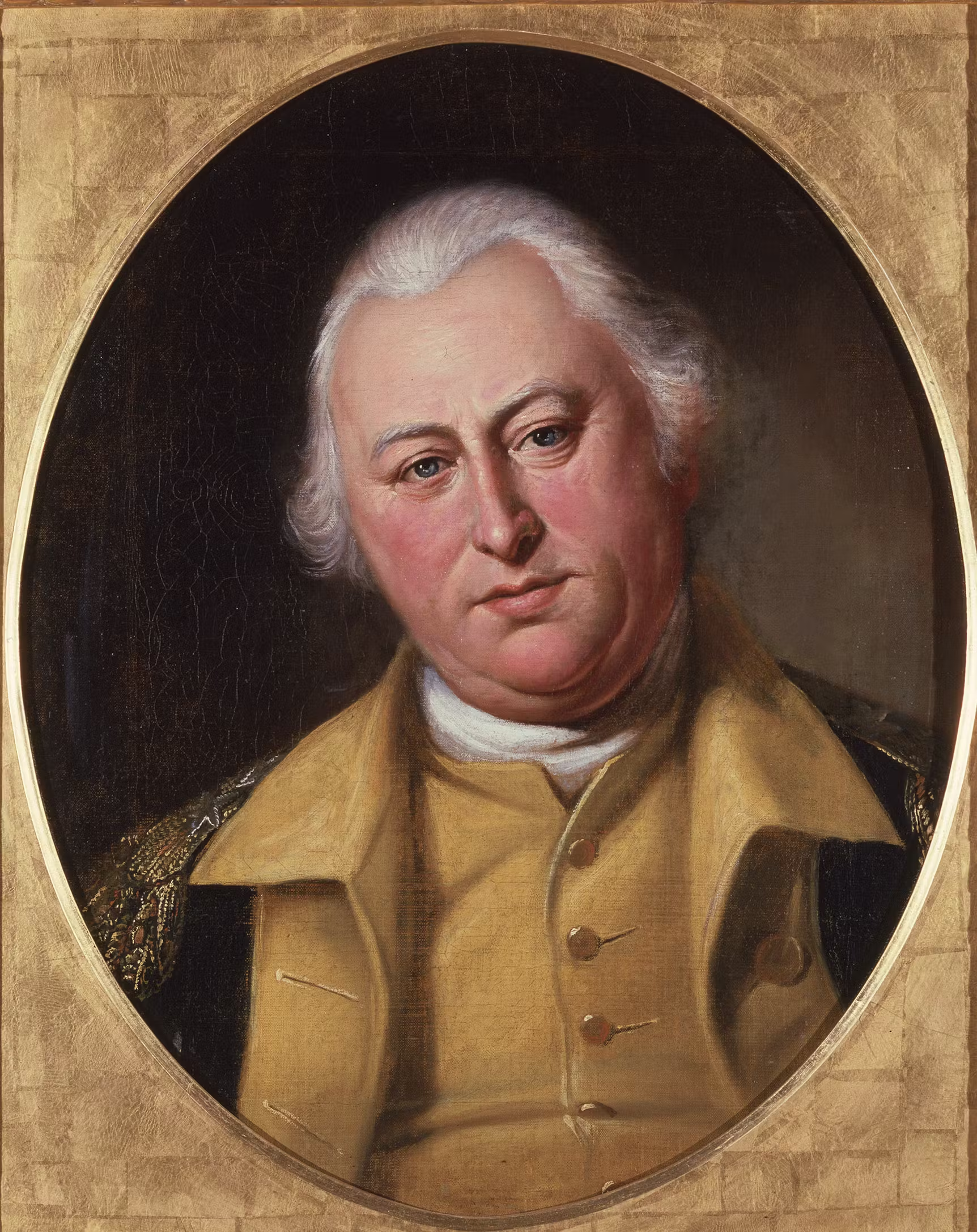
- Portrait by Charles Willson Peale, c. 1784

1st Collector of the Port of Boston
- In office 1789–1809
- Preceded by: Position established
- Succeeded by: Henry Dearborn

2nd Lieutenant Governor of Massachusetts
- In office 1788–1789
- Governor: John Hancock
- Preceded by: Thomas Cushing
- Succeeded by: Samuel Adams

1st United States Secretary at War
- In office March 1, 1781 – November 2, 1783
- Preceded by: Position established
- Succeeded by: Henry Knox

1st Clerk of the Massachusetts Provincial Congress
- In office October 7, 1774 – May 31, 1775
- Preceded by: Office established
- Succeeded by: Samuel Freeman

Committee of Safety
- In office October 7, 1774 – February 1, 1775
- Constituency: At-large (Commissary Officer)

Personal details
- Born: January 24, 1733 Hingham, Massachusetts Bay
- Died: May 9, 1810 (aged 77) Hingham, Massachusetts
- Resting place: Old Ship Burying Ground, Hingham
- Party: Federalist
- Spouse: Mary Cushing (m. 1756)
- Children: 11
- Relatives: Lincoln family

Military service
- Allegiance: Great Britain; United States
- Branch/service: Massachusetts Bay militia Continental Army; United States Army
- Years of service: 1755–1777 (Ma.); 1777–1781 (U.S.)
- Rank: Major General
- Commands: Massachusetts Bay militia Bound Brook; Southern Department
- Battles/wars: French and Indian War; American Revolutionary War; Boston Campaign; Battle of White Plains; Battle of Bound Brook; Battle of Bemis Heights; Siege of Savannah; Siege of Charleston; Yorktown Campaign; Shays's Rebellion

Benjamin Lincoln (January 24, 1733 (O.S. January 13, 1733) – May 9, 1810) was an American army officer. He served as a major general in the Continental Army during the American Revolutionary War. Lincoln was involved in three major surrenders during the war: his participation in the Battles of Saratoga (sustaining a wound shortly afterward) contributed to the surrender of a British army under John Burgoyne, he oversaw the largest American surrender of the war at the 1780 siege of Charleston, and, as George Washington's second in command, he formally accepted the British surrender at Yorktown.

Lincoln served from 1781 to 1783 as the first United States secretary of war. While Secretary of War, Lincoln became an original member of The Society of the Cincinnati of the state of Massachusetts and was elected as the first president of the Massachusetts Society on June 9, 1783. After the war, Lincoln was active in politics in his native Massachusetts, running several times for lieutenant governor but only winning one term in that office. In 1787, Lincoln led a militia army (privately funded by Massachusetts merchants) in the suppression of Shays's Rebellion, and was a strong supporter of the new United States Constitution. He was for many of his later years the politically influential customs collector of the Port of Boston.

== Early life ==
Benjamin Lincoln was born on January 24, 1733, in Hingham, Province of Massachusetts Bay, the sixth child and first son of Colonel Benjamin Lincoln and his second wife Elizabeth Thaxter Lincoln. Lincoln's ancestors were among those who first settled in Hingham, beginning with Thomas Lincoln 'the cooper,' who was among several Lincolns who settled in Hingham when it was part of the Massachusetts Bay Colony. Lincoln's father, one of the wealthiest men in Suffolk County, served as a member of the governor's council from 1753 until 1770, and occupied many other civic posts before his death in 1771. Lincoln's maternal grandfather, Col. Samuel Thaxter, one of the most prominent and influential citizens in Hingham, became Colonel in a regiment and one of those commissioned to settle the boundary between Massachusetts and Rhode Island in 1719.

In his early life, Lincoln worked on the family farm, and attended the local school. He followed his father into government, becoming town constable at 21, and in 1755 he joined the 3rd Regiment of the Suffolk County militia (where his father was colonel) as an adjutant. In 1756, at the age of 23, Lincoln married Mary Cushing, daughter of Elijah Cushing of Pembroke, Massachusetts, whose ancestors were also among the founders of Hingham. They had eleven children, seven of whom survived to adulthood. In 1757, he was elected the town clerk of Hingham, a post he held for twenty years. He continued to be active in the militia during the French and Indian War, but saw no action, and was promoted to major by the end of the conflict in 1763.

Lincoln was elected a Hingham town selectman in 1765, a post to which he held for six years. During this tenure political opposition rose in the province to Parliamentary tax measures, polarizing the political landscape of the colony. Lincoln sided with the opposition, eventually becoming a leading force among Hingham's Patriots. In 1770, in a list of resolutions passed by the inhabitants of Hingham, Lincoln outlined the measures urged by residents towards the non-importation of British goods, and he condemned the Boston Massacre. In 1772, Lincoln was promoted to lieutenant colonel of the 3rd Regiment of the Suffolk militia. That same year he won election as a representative of the town to the provincial assembly.

== American Revolution ==
With the arrival of General Thomas Gage as governor of the colony in 1774, the provincial assembly was dissolved, but reformed itself into the Massachusetts Provincial Congress. Lincoln continued to win election to this body, and was placed on committees overseeing militia organization and supply, a position that came to be of utmost importance when the American Revolutionary War broke out with the Battles of Lexington and Concord in April 1775. He was then appointed to the congress' committee of safety, and also was elected to its executive council, which exercised executive authority over the province outside besieged Boston. He was deeply involved in ensuring that supplies of all sorts reached the nascent Continental Army outside Boston, procuring supplies from blankets to gunpowder.

=== Defense of New York ===
In January 1776, Lincoln was promoted to major general of the Massachusetts militia, overseeing the coastal defenses of the state. After the British evacuated Boston, he and Continental Army General Artemas Ward oversaw attempts to improve the state's coastal fortifications, and he was ordered to hold the state's militia brigades in readiness in case the British returned. In May 1776 he directed the state forces that successfully drove the last Royal Navy ships from Boston Harbor.

Despite his lack of combat experience, Lincoln began lobbying state representatives to the Continental Congress for a Continental Army officers commission, anticipating that the aging and ill General Ward might soon step down. The idea was generally well received, with one representative writing that Lincoln was "a good man for a Brigadier General" and "a man of abilities", even though he had not "had much experience". While a Continental commission was not immediately forthcoming, Lincoln was placed in command of a brigade of militia the state sent to join General George Washington at New York Town in September 1776.

When Lincoln reached southwestern Connecticut, Washington first ordered him to prepare an expedition across Long Island Sound to raid British positions on Long Island. The expedition was aborted when Washington began to retreat from New York after the Battle of Long Island (Brooklyn) in August 1776, and Lincoln was ordered to bring two regiments to join Washington's army as it later retreated northward from New York Town. Lincoln's troops secured the Continental retreat to White Plains, New York, and were in the main Continental formation during the subsequent Battle of White Plains in October 1776; this portion of the troops saw no action in the battle. The enlistment terms of his men expiring, Lincoln returned briefly to Massachusetts to take command of new recruits for the coming year's campaigns. Based on a recommendation from General Washington as "a gentleman well worthy of notice in the Military Line", Congress commissioned Lincoln a major general in the Continental Army on February 14, 1777.

Lincoln's first command was that of a forward outpost at Bound Brook, New Jersey, only 3 miles (4.8 km) from British sentries outside New Brunswick. He established his headquarters at the nearby Van Horne House. After months of skirmishing, his post was the target of a surprise attack on April 13, 1777. In the Battle of Bound Brook he was defeated by a much larger force under the command of Lord Cornwallis, barely escaping capture.

=== Saratoga ===
In July 1777, Washington dispatched three of his best officers, Colonel Morgan, General Arnold and General Lincoln north to assist Philip Schuyler, and afterward Schuyler's replacement Horatio Gates, in the defense of upstate New York against the advance of General John Burgoyne's expedition from Quebec. Lincoln was ordered to coordinate the activities of the New England militia being recruited for the effort. General Schuyler asked Lincoln, from a base in southern Vermont, to harass the British supply line as the British moved south from Fort Ticonderoga toward Albany. Lincoln's job was complicated by New Hampshire's militia leader John Stark, who categorically refused to put his forces under Lincoln's command. Stark had previously held a Continental commission and resigned over a promotion snub, and had only agreed to serve in his native New Hampshire if he was not under Continental authority. Stark led his forces to victory in the Battle of Bennington in mid-August, which led to the capture or deaths of 1,000 Hessian soldiers from Burgoyne's army, while Lincoln's force was still growing.

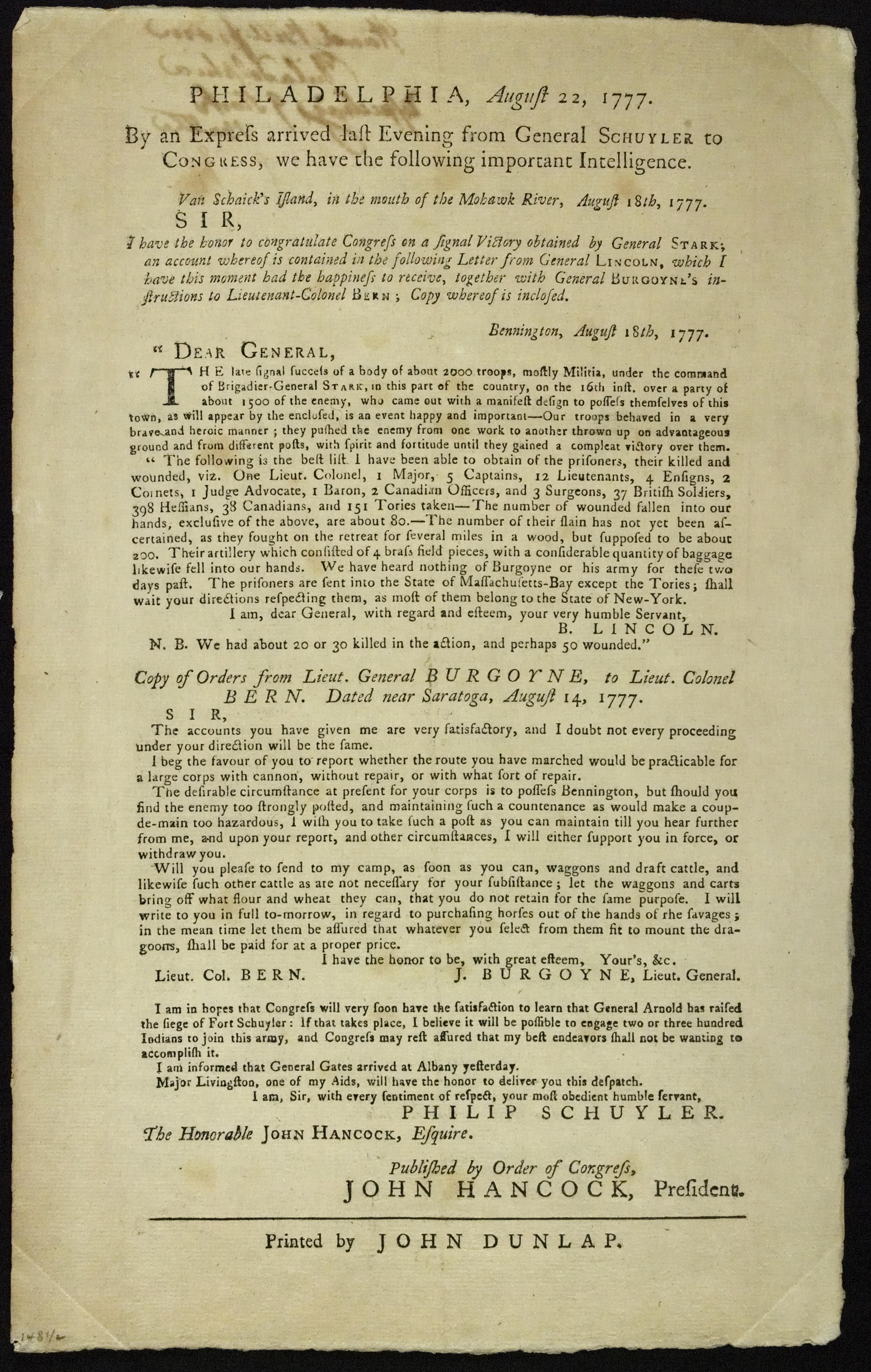
Continental Congress Broadside, 1777 mentions Gen. Lincoln's letter.

By early September Lincoln had 2,000 men under his command, and launched several detachments at the British supply line. One of those detachments, led by Colonel John Brown, successfully harassed British positions outside Fort Ticonderoga, freeing American prisoners and even making an unsuccessful attempt to capture the fort in late September. By this time General Gates, who had taken command from Schuyler in August, had ordered Lincoln's force to join him near Stillwater, New York. Lincoln arrived on September 22, three days after the strategically conclusive Battle of Freeman's Farm where Colonel Morgan's sharpshooters killed most of the officers and three quarters of the artillerymen, resulting in the capture of 6 of the 10 British cannons. There Lincoln's militia were to hold the eastern shore of the Hudson River.

Lincoln's militia played no role in the American victory at the October 7 Battle of Bemis Heights, since the action took place on the western side of the river, but Lincoln was in command of the American right in the battle. These forces saw little action, which was concentrated on the American left. American forces, led by Generals Benedict Arnold and Enoch Poor, successfully breached the British defenses, undoing the small gains the British had made at Freeman's Farm and compelling Burgoyne to retreat a short distance. That evening Gates ordered Lincoln to perform reconnaissance; the British left fell back as Lincoln and his 1,500 man force probed them, and Lincoln was able to occupy the former British lines. In council that evening Lincoln recommended that the ford at Fort Edward be fortified against the possibility that Burgoyne would attempt to reach it and cross the river in an attempt to return to Ticonderoga. Gates agreed with the plan, and ordered Lincoln's militia to do so. During these movements Lincoln encountered a British company; in the ensuing skirmish Lincoln's right ankle was shattered by a musket ball, much like General Arnold was hit in the leg during his charge during the Battle of Bemis Heights, even though General Gates had already relieved Arnold of command due to insubordination in Arnold's manner of disagreement with Gates' battle plans.

Lincoln was transported to Albany, where he was treated, and where he learned of Burgoyne's October 17 surrender. His son helped him return to Hingham in February 1778, where he convalesced for several months. The injury left his right leg two inches shorter than the left, and for many years the ankle wound was prone to reopening and the danger of infection. During his recovery Lincoln learned that General Arnold's seniority had been restored, reducing Lincoln to the lowest-ranked major general. Although he considered resignation over the slight, Washington and supporters in the Continental Congress assured him of his value to the army.

=== Southern theater (1778–1781) ===
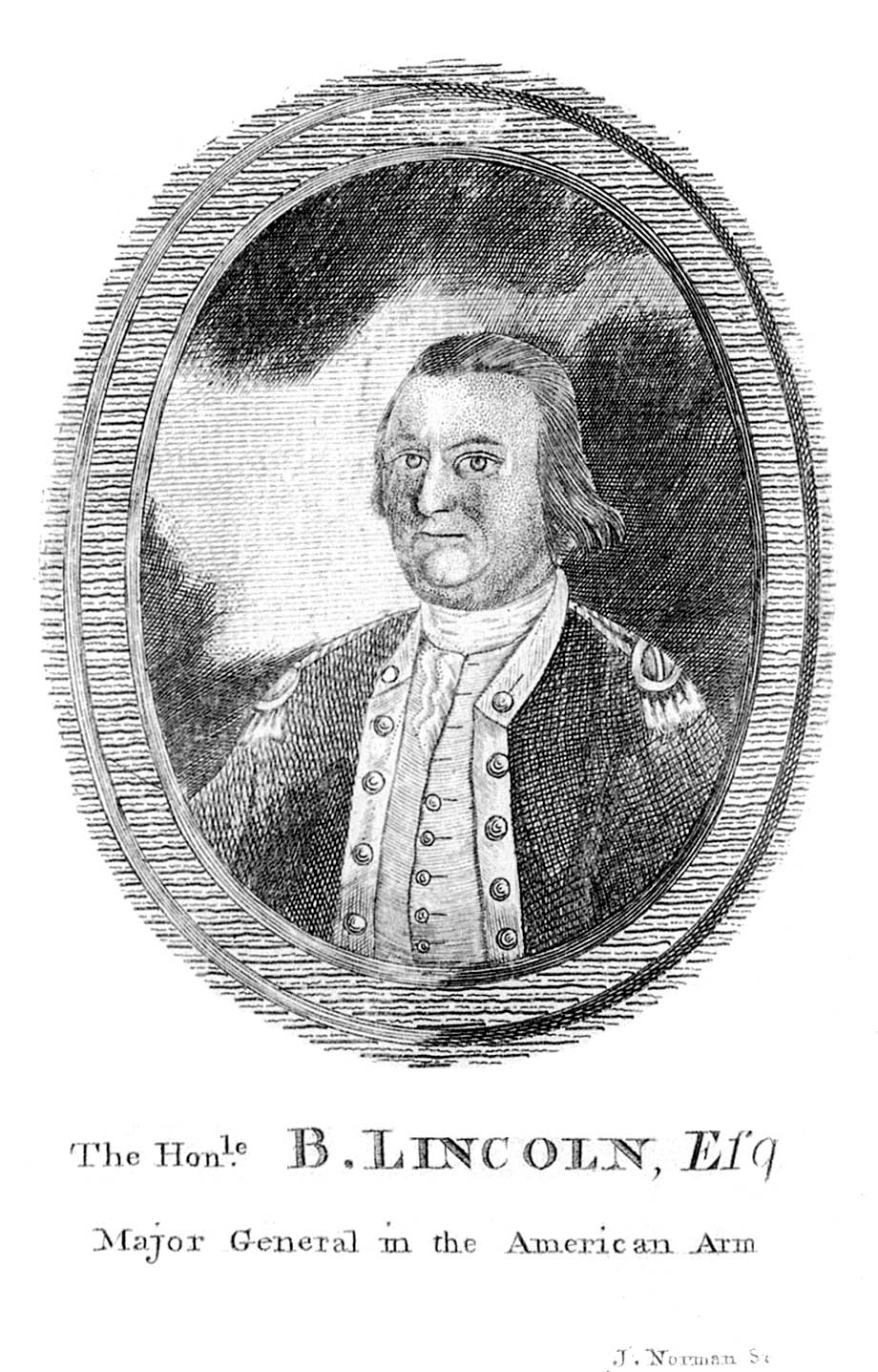
The Hon. B. Lincoln, Esq. Major General, Continental Army.

Lincoln rejoined Washington outside New York in August 1778, and was appointed commander of the Southern department in September. Washington sent Lincoln, Lafayette and Lee (Henry "Light Horse Harry") to the Southern Department to oppose the British army under Clinton and Cornwallis. Lincoln participated in the unsuccessful French-led siege of Savannah, Georgia in October 1779, after which he retreated to Charleston, South Carolina. He took command of the garrison of Charleston. In March 1780, the city was surrounded by a sizable British force dispatched from New York. After a relatively brief siege, Lincoln was forced to surrender more than 5,000 men to Lieutenant General Sir Henry Clinton on May 12, 1780, but did so in a way that allowed the South Carolina militia to escape as well as some Continental forces, that annoyed the British toward Lincoln.

Lincoln, desperate for more troops, had pleaded with the South Carolina legislature to arm 1,000 enslaved African Americans to ward off the approaching British. Rather than see armed slaves, the legislature began negotiations with the British commanders to allow the British forces to pass through South Carolina.

The loss of the southern army at Charleston was one of the worst Continental defeats of the war. He was denied the honors of war in surrendering, due to the British annoyance at his facilitating the escape of South Carolina militia units and some Continental forces, such as those with Lafayette and Lee, which deeply rankled Lincoln. Lincoln was paroled, and in the court of inquiry no charges were ever brought against him.

After being exchanged for the British Major General William Phillips in November 1780, Lincoln returned to Washington's main army. He led a large portion of the Army south from Head of Elk Maryland to Hampton, Virginia, to march to the west to Yorktown where the British were encamped. Lincoln played a major role in the siege of Yorktown and the surrender of Lord Cornwallis on October 19, 1781. Cornwallis plead illness, and so did not attend the surrender ceremony, choosing instead to send his second-in-command, the Irish general Charles O'Hara. General Washington refused to accept Cornwallis' sword from O'Hara, directing O'Hara to present it instead to Lincoln, Washington's own second-in-command.

=== Secretary at War (1781–1783) ===
From 1781 to late 1783, Lincoln served as the first United States secretary at war. He was appointed by the Confederation Congress under the Articles of Confederation and Perpetual Union, adopted 1781. He was succeeded in the post by Continental Army artillery chief, Major General Henry Knox, (who later continued in the position as the first United States secretary of war from 1789 to 1795 under the new Federal Constitution of 1787, during George Washington's two terms as the first president of the United States). He was elected a Fellow of the American Academy of Arts and Sciences in 1781.

While Secretary at War, Lincoln was admitted as an original member of The Society of the Cincinnati in the state of Massachusetts and was elected as the first president of the Massachusetts Society on June 9, 1783, subsequently supporting the election of George Washington as the first President General of The Society of the Cincinnati on June 19.

== Post-war politics ==
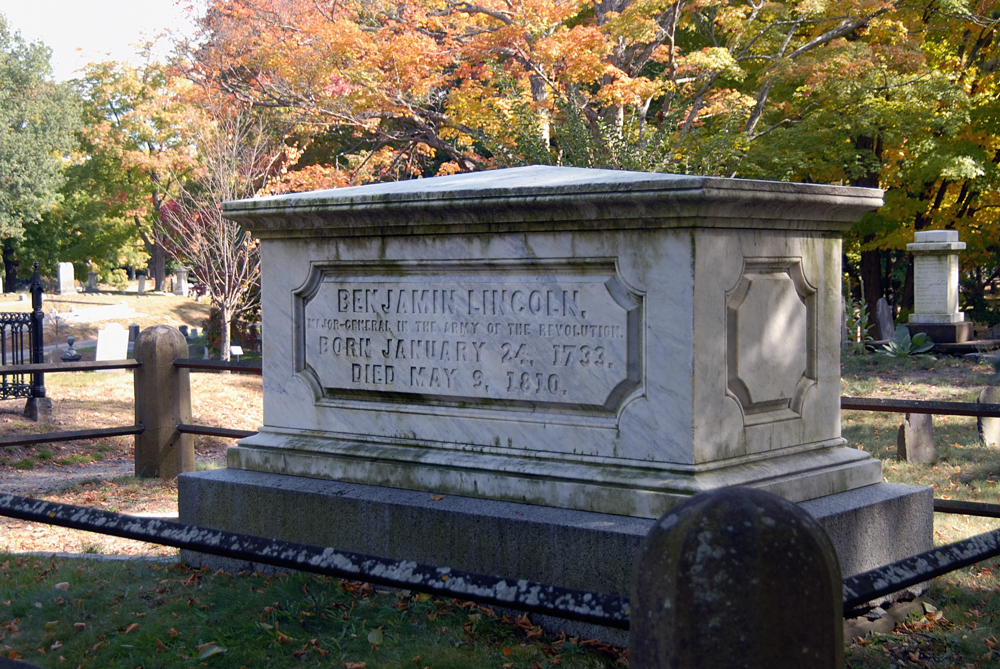
Tomb of Gen. Benjamin Lincoln, Hingham Cemetery, Hingham, Massachusetts

In early 1787, Lincoln helped put an end to an uprising of western Massachusetts farmers opposed to increased taxation and government coercion in their trade, known as Shays's Rebellion; Lincoln commanded 3,000 privately funded militia to disperse the opposition, and captured over one hundred. The uprising with the near-capture of a federal arsenal by rebels caused a national uproar, and it was an important part of the national crisis that justified calling the Constitutional Convention. The next year, as a Suffolk County, Hingham delegate, Lincoln voted to support the United States Constitution at the Massachusetts Federal Convention, which ratified 187 to 168 on February 6, 1788.

On February 4, 1789, Lincoln was one of only 12 men who received electoral votes during the first election for President and Vice President of the United States, receiving the vote of an unrecorded elector from the State of Georgia.

Lincoln also served as one of the first trustees of Derby Academy, founded in Hingham by Sarah Hersey Derby, widow of a wealthy Salem shipping magnate.

He stayed active in public life in various capacities, including a term as Lieutenant Governor of Massachusetts and many years as the Collector of the Port of Boston. In 1806, Lincoln attempted to resign as Collector but President Thomas Jefferson requested he stay until he appointed a successor. This act led to Representative Josiah Quincy III to attempt to have Jefferson impeached in January 1809, even though Jefferson was set to leave office in March of that year. He retired from public life in 1809 and died in Hingham on May 9, 1810.

== Legacy ==
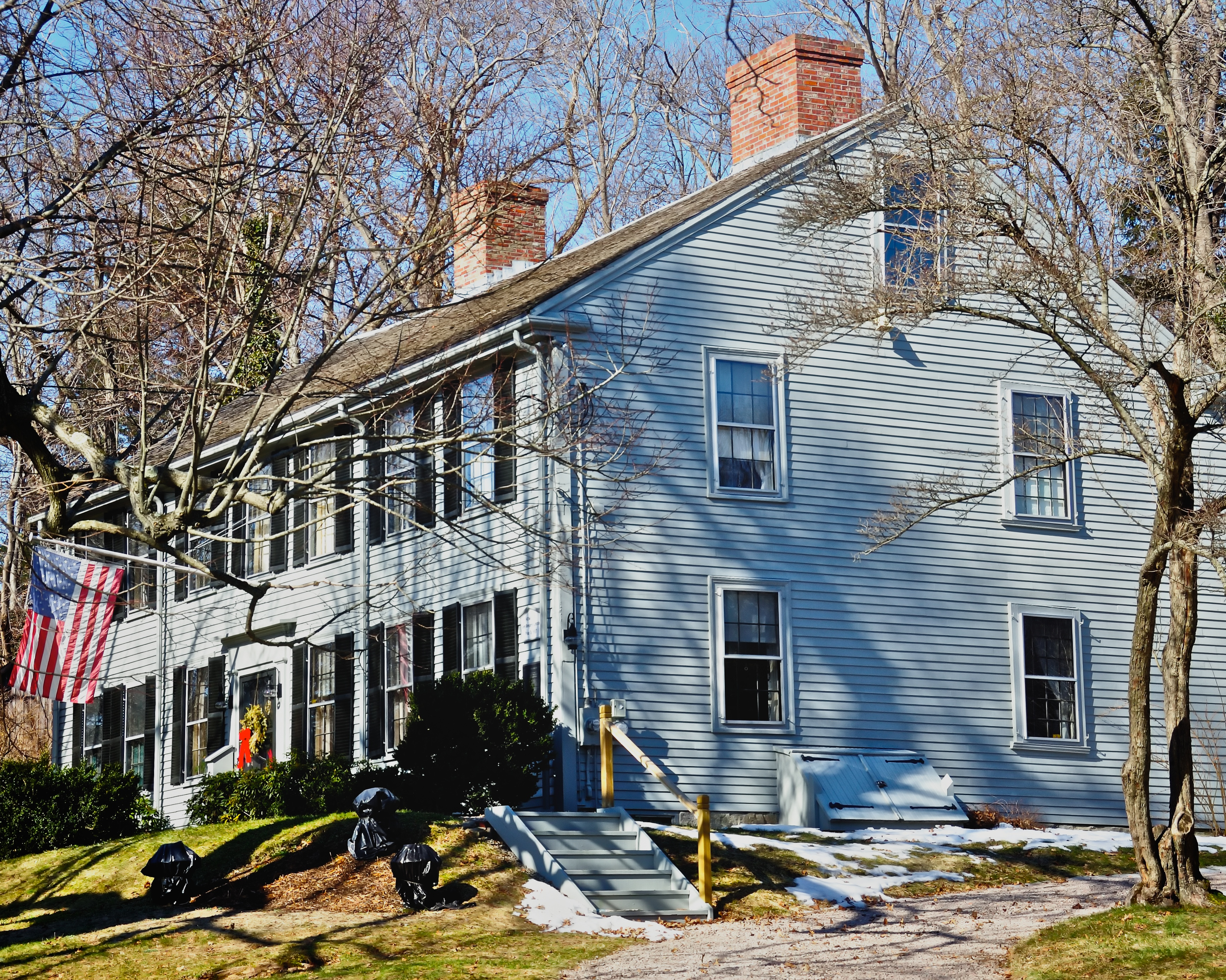
General Benjamin Lincoln House, where Lincoln was born

Lincoln is buried in the Old Ship Burying Ground behind the Old Ship Church in Hingham. Among the pallbearers at Lincoln's funeral were John Adams, Cotton Tufts, Robert Treat Paine, Richard Cranch and Thomas Melvill. In Lincoln's honor, the bells at Boston and other places were tolled for an hour; the flags of vessels, and those at Fort Independence and Fort Warren, as well as those at the Charlestown Navy Yard were lowered to half-mast.

He was one of the few men to have been involved in the three major surrenders of the American Revolutionary War: twice as a victor (at Yorktown and Saratoga), and once as the defeated party (at Charleston). In spite of the major role he played during the war, he tends to be less well-remembered than many of his contemporaries in the Continental Army.

He was a founding member of The Massachusetts Society for Promoting Agriculture (M.S.P.A.) one of the earliest agricultural societies in the United States. The Society was incorporated by an act of the Commonwealth of Massachusetts on March 7, 1792.

While there are a few exceptions, places named "Lincoln" in the American South tend to be named after Benjamin Lincoln rather than Abraham Lincoln, the 16th President. Counties and/or towns in Alabama, Georgia, Kentucky, Missouri, North Carolina, and Tennessee are named in his honor, as are communities in North Carolina (Lincolnton), Georgia (Lincolnton), Vermont (Lincoln), and Maine (Lincolnville). Streets in Columbia, South Carolina, and Savannah, Georgia (Lincoln Street), bear his name, as does Lincoln Hall at the United States Coast Guard Training Center in Yorktown, Virginia.

Lincoln's lifelong home still stands. It was declared a National Historic Landmark in 1972, and is listed on the National Register of Historic Places.

== Notes ==
Political offices
New office	United States Secretary at War; 1781–1783	Vacant Title next held by Henry Knox
U.S. Senate
Preceded by Thomas Cushing	Lieutenant Governor of Massachusetts; 1788–1789	Succeeded by Samuel Adams
