= Old Ship Church =

Historic church in Massachusetts, United States

- Old Ship Church (Old Ship Meetinghouse)
- U.S. National Register of Historic Places
- U.S. National Historic Landmark
- U.S. Historic district – Contributing property
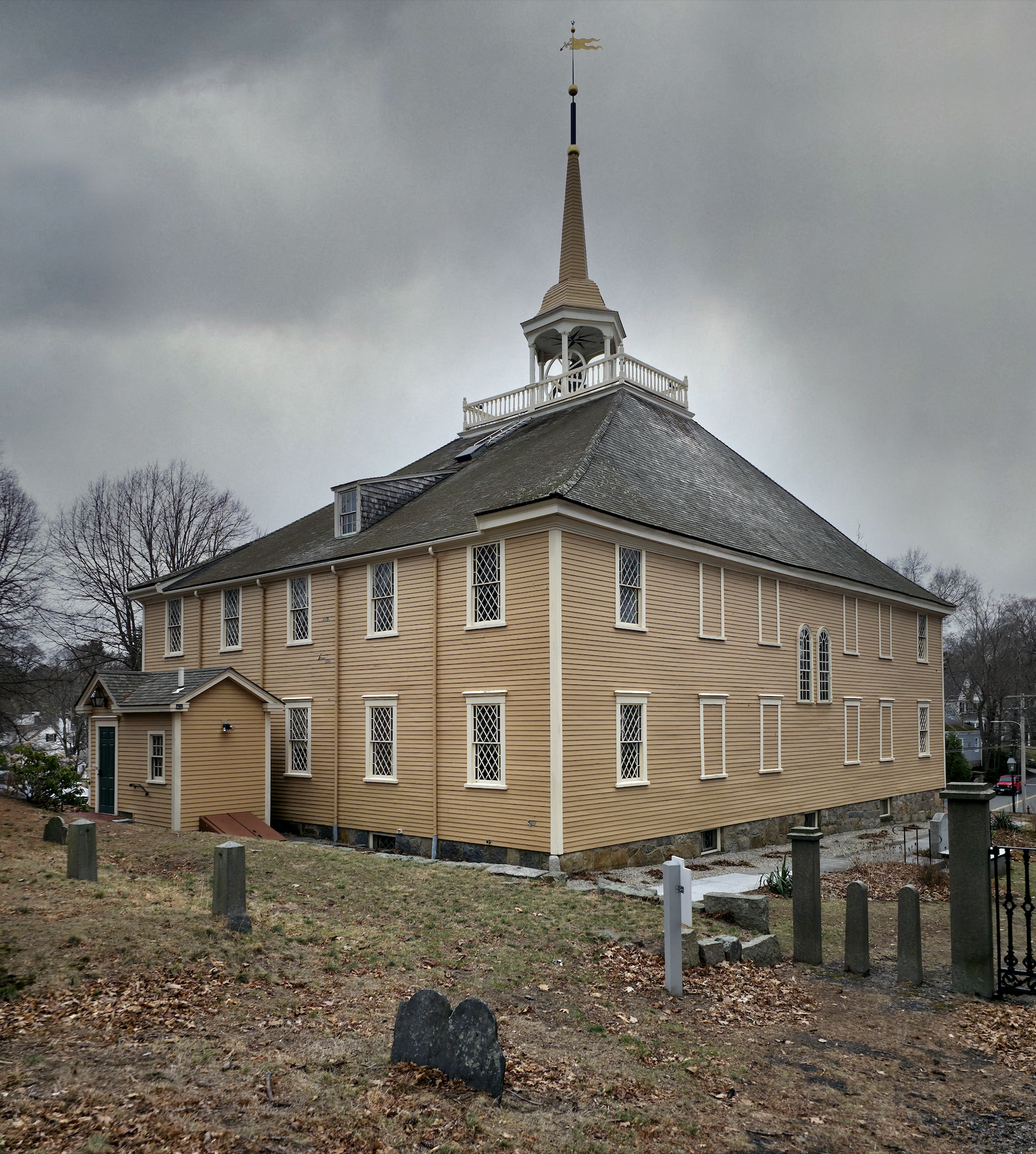
- Old Ship Church

- Location within Massachusetts Location within the United States
- Location: Main Street; Hingham, Massachusetts
- Coordinates: 42.24125°N 70.88695°W
- Built: 1681
- Part of: Lincoln Historic District (ID90001728)
- NRHP reference No.: 66000777

Significant dates
- Added to NRHP: October 15, 1966
- Designated NHL: October 9, 1960
- Designated CP: January 7, 1991

The Old Ship Church (also known as the Old Ship Meetinghouse) is a Puritan church built in 1681 in Hingham, Massachusetts. It is the only surviving 17th-century Puritan meetinghouse in the United States. Its congregation, gathered in 1635 and officially known as First Parish in Hingham, occupies the oldest church building in continuous ecclesiastical use in the country. On October 9, 1960, it was designated a National Historic Landmark, and on November 15, 1966, it was added to the National Register of Historic Places.

Old Ship Church is, according to The New York Times, "the oldest continuously worshiped-in church in North America and the only surviving example in this country of the English Gothic style of the 17th century. The more familiar delicately spired white Colonial churches of New England would not be built for more than half a century." Within the church, "the ceiling, made of great oak beams, looks like the inverted frame of a ship", notes The Washington Post. "Built in 1681, it is the oldest church in continuous use as a house of worship in North America."

The most distinctive feature of the structure is its hammerbeam roof, a Gothic open timber construction, the most well-known example being that of Westminster Hall. Some of those working on the soaring structure were no doubt ship carpenters; others were East Anglians familiar with the method of constructing a hammerbeam roof.

== History ==
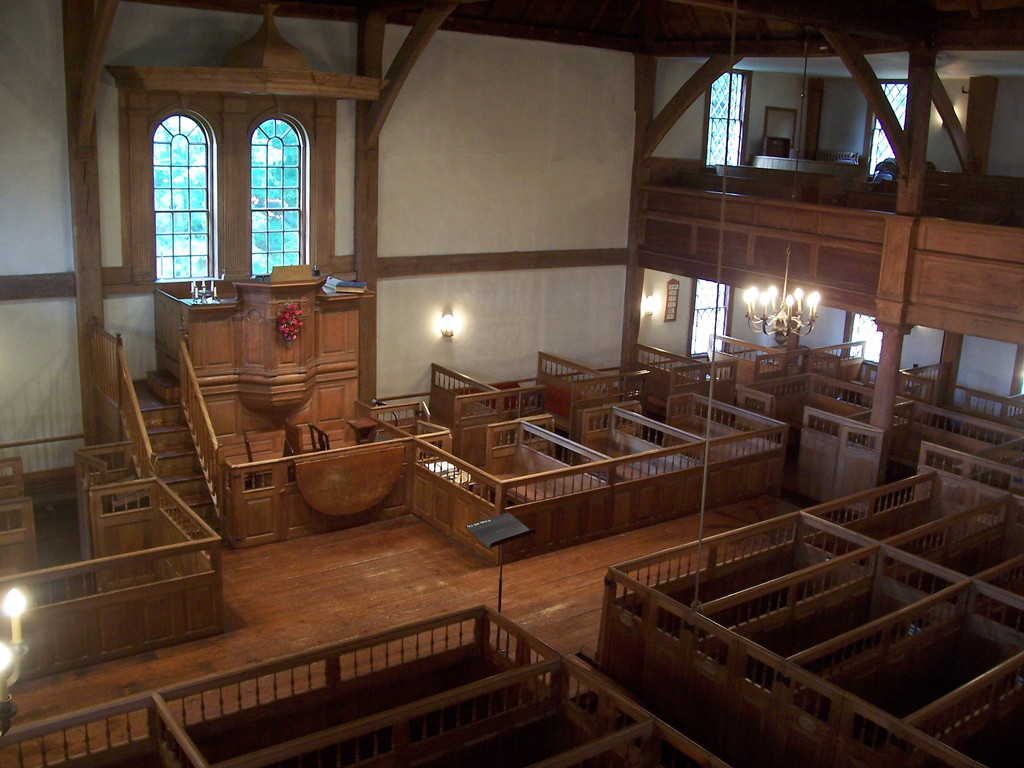
Interior of the church

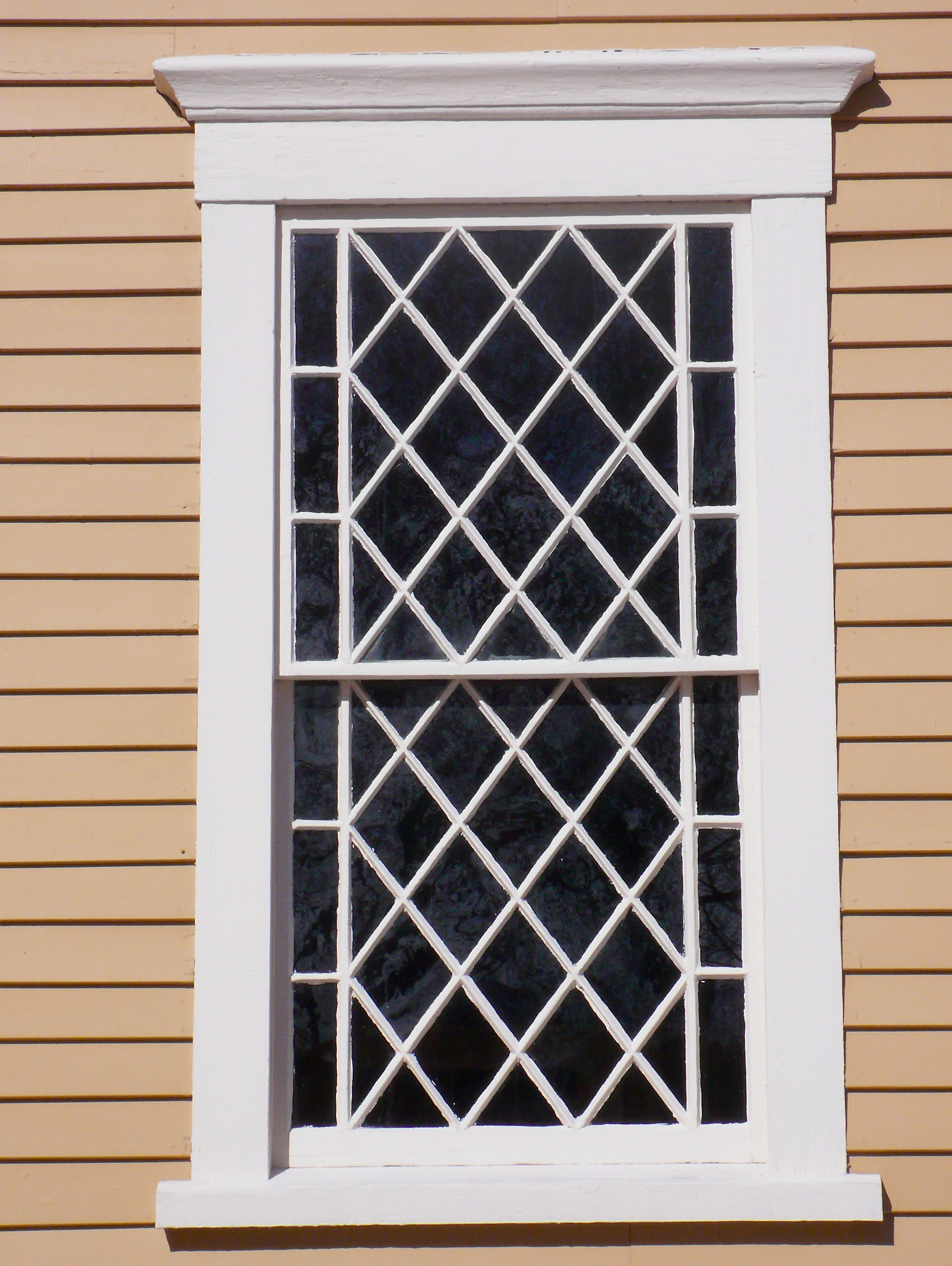
A church window

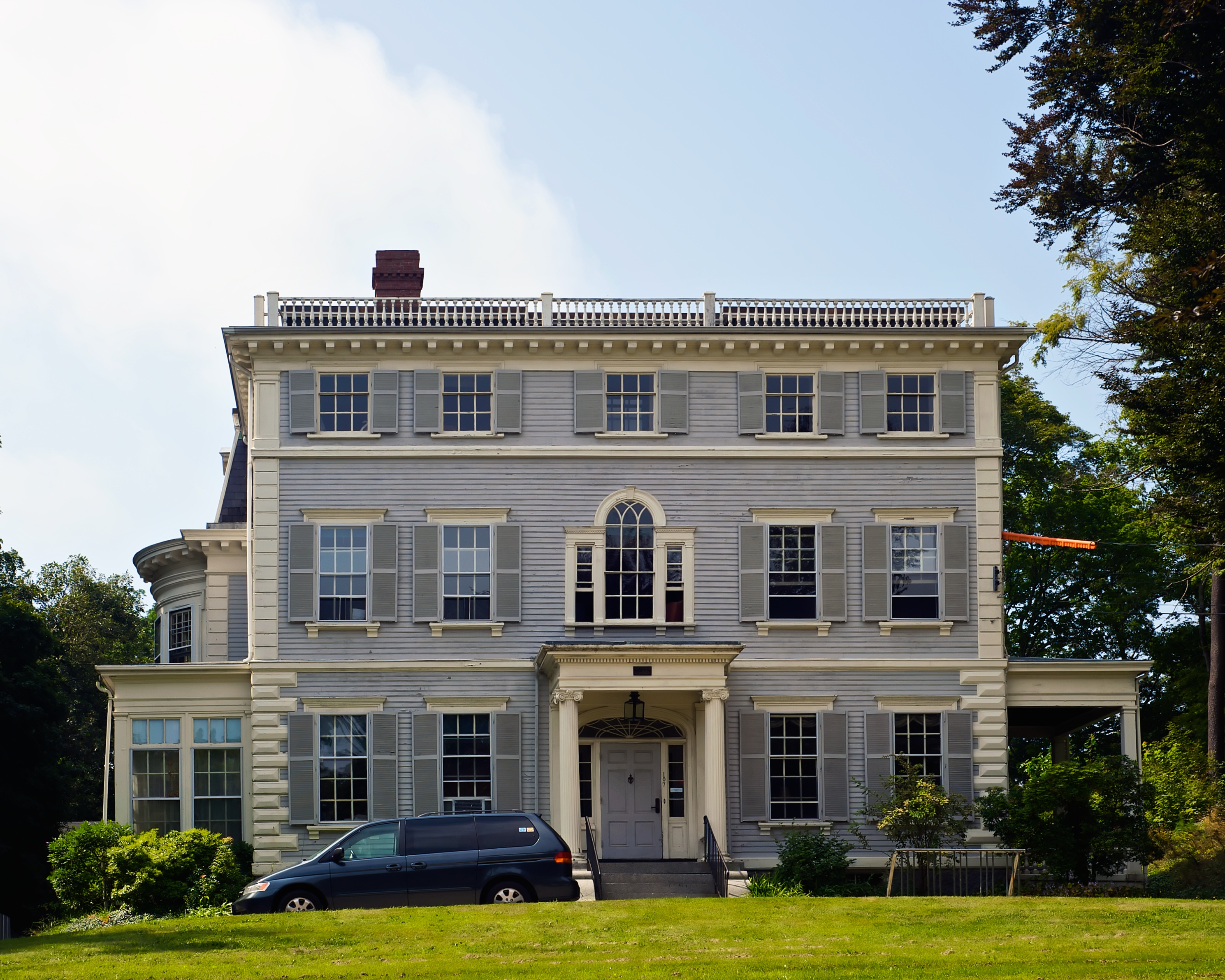
Old Ship Parish House

The first minister of the Hingham congregation who built Old Ship was the Rev. Peter Hobart, who had attended what was then Puritan-dominated University of Cambridge. Natives of Hingham in the county of Norfolk in East Anglia, Peter Hobart, his father Edmund and his brother Capt. Joshua Hobart were among Hingham's most prominent early settlers. Edmund Hobart and his wife Margaret (Dewey), said Cotton Mather, "were eminent for piety ... and feared God above many." Assisting Hobart in the foundation of the congregation was Rev. Robert Peck, Hobart's senior and formerly rector of St Andrew's Church in Hingham, Norfolk.

After 44 years of service, minister Peter Hobart died on January 20, 1679, on the eve of the building of the new house of worship. Hobart's diary of events in Hingham, begun in the year 1635, was continued on his death by his son David. By the time Old Ship was built, Harvard-educated Rev. John Norton, (Note: Rev. John Norton of Hingham, among the earliest graduates of Harvard College, was the son of William Norton of Ipswich, and nephew of Rev. John Norton who was the successor of Rev. John Cotton as pastor of First Church in Boston. See Water 1905, pp. 152) who had been ordained by Peter Hobart, had assumed Hobart's ministry. (Note: Rev. John Norton was the great-grandfather of Abigail Adams, wife of President John Adams of Braintree, Massachusetts.See Mitchell 1947, pp. xxvii) While Rev. Norton was the first pastor of the congregation at its new home in Old Ship Church, Rev. Peter Hobart was the founder of the congregation, although he died before the new meetinghouse was finished.

Old Ship Church deacon John Leavitt, whose son John married Rev. Hobart's daughter Bathsheba, was deacon when Old Ship was constructed and he argued forcefully for the construction of a new meetinghouse. The matter of replacing the old thatched log meeting house stirred intense emotion in Hingham, and it took two heated town meetings to settle on a site for the new edifice, which was built on land donated by Capt. Joshua Hobart, brother of Rev. Peter Hobart. Ultimately, the town appropriated £430 for the new building, said to be the equal of any in the Massachusetts Bay Colony. The modern frame edifice, devoid of ornamentation, was raised in 1681, and accommodated its first worship service the following year. Old Ship, with its stark wooden pulpit and stripped-down interior, could not have been further from the houses of worship known to many of the East Anglians who settled Hingham, Massachusetts. It was, in a sense, the anti-Wool church.

The program celebrating the 275th anniversary of the raising of the Old Ship Church in July 1956 described the raising of the meetinghouse:

It was a hot day, the 26th of July 1681, when the townspeople gathered on the wooden knoll bordering on Bachelor's Row (now Main Street), Hingham, Mass, to take part in what the Selectmen's record described as the 'raising of the frame of the new Meeting House.' It was a community undertaking and every freeman in the town had been assessed for the cost of the structure according to his worth, in amounts ranging from one pound to fifteen pounds. There were all there, regardless of the heat, including Deacon John Leavitt, well over seventy years old, who had led the successful fight to have the new Meeting House erected approximately on the site of the old.

The side galleries were added to the building in 1730 and 1755.

Originally the building was furnished with backless wooden benches, with the first box pews being installed in 1755.

In the Victorian period, the box pews were removed and replaced with curved pews fanning outward from the pulpit, while the walls were papered and drapes were added to the windows. The church was restored to its current appearance, reflecting its 17th and 18th century characteristics, in 1930.

== Current use ==
The current minister is Kenneth Read-Brown, a descendant of Rev. Peter Hobart. The congregation is Unitarian Universalist and is a Welcoming Congregation. Some of the meetinghouse furnishings still in use date to its founding: Old Ship's christening bowl, for instance, was made before 1600 and was likely brought to the Massachusetts Bay Colony by emigrants from Hingham, England.

== Old Ship Burying Ground ==
Old Ship Church is abutted by a large colonial graveyard to the rear of the church. The graveyard, Hingham Cemetery, is sometimes called the First Settlers cemetery. It is independent of the Old Ship Church and is owned and managed by the Hingham Cemetery Corporation. It was originally part of a 6-acre (24,000 m^{2}) tract of land granted by the town to Thomas Gill, one of Hingham's earliest settlers. (It now comprises 13 acres (53,000 m^{2}), and is the oldest cemetery in Hingham.) Buried within its precincts are many of Hingham's earliest settlers and their descendants, including members of the Cushing, Hersey, Otis, Chaffee, Lane, Andrews, Hobart, Loring, Bates, Leavitt, Thaxter, Tower, Beal, Lincoln, Fearing and other prominent early families.

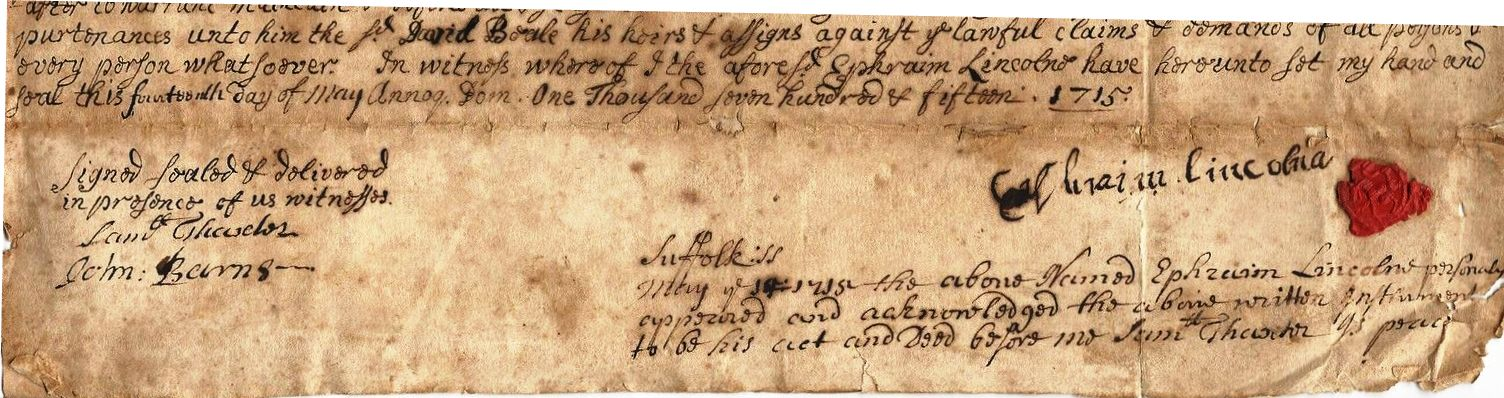
Signature of Col. Samuel Thaxter of Hingham

Among the prominent individuals buried in the graveyard are: Thomas Joy (1618–1678), builder of the first statehouse in Boston (the building was built of timber) and designer of the Old Ship Church; Rev. Peter Hobart (1604–1679), pastor of Old Ship Church, ancestor of Senator John Kerry; Edmund Hobart, father of Rev. Peter, instrumental in founding Hingham, ancestor of John Henry Hobart; William Hersey, one of Hingham's first settlers, ancestor of writer John Hersey; Col. Samuel Thaxter (1665–1740), one of "His Majesty's Council and Col. of His Regiment," delegate to the General Court and Hingham selectman; Col. Benjamin Lincoln (1699–1771), member of "His Majesty's Council," town selectman, town clerk, husband of Elizabeth Thaxter (daughter of Col. Samuel Thaxter), and father of Major General Benjamin Lincoln; Mrs. Sarah Langley Hersey Derby (1714–1790), founder of Derby Academy in Hingham, widow of Dr. Ezekiel Hersey and of Salem merchant Richard Derby, father of Elias Hasket Derby; Mary Revere Lincoln (1770–1853), daughter of Paul Revere; Governor John Albion Andrew (1818–1867), Civil War governor of Massachusetts, instrumental in founding the 54th and 55th Massachusetts Regiments, the first regiments of black infantry in the Civil War; John Davis Long (1838-1915), 32nd Governor of Massachusetts and Secretary of the Navy;(Wilmon Brewer (1895–1998), author/poet, philanthropist (major donations: Old Ordinary tavern to the town of Hingham, More-Brewer Conservation Area, World's End Park); Solomon Lincoln (1804–1881), Hingham attorney, author of first history of Hingham (1827), state senator, president of Boston's Webster Bank, and president of the Hingham Cemetery Corporation.

The oldest burials date from at least 1672, before the building of the current meeting house. The Settlers' Monument in Old Ship burying ground marks the place where the remains of Hingham's earliest settlers were moved after their initial burying place along modern-day Main Street, in front of Old Ship Church, was excavated for the passage of horse-drawn trolleys about 1835.

== Memorial Bell Tower ==
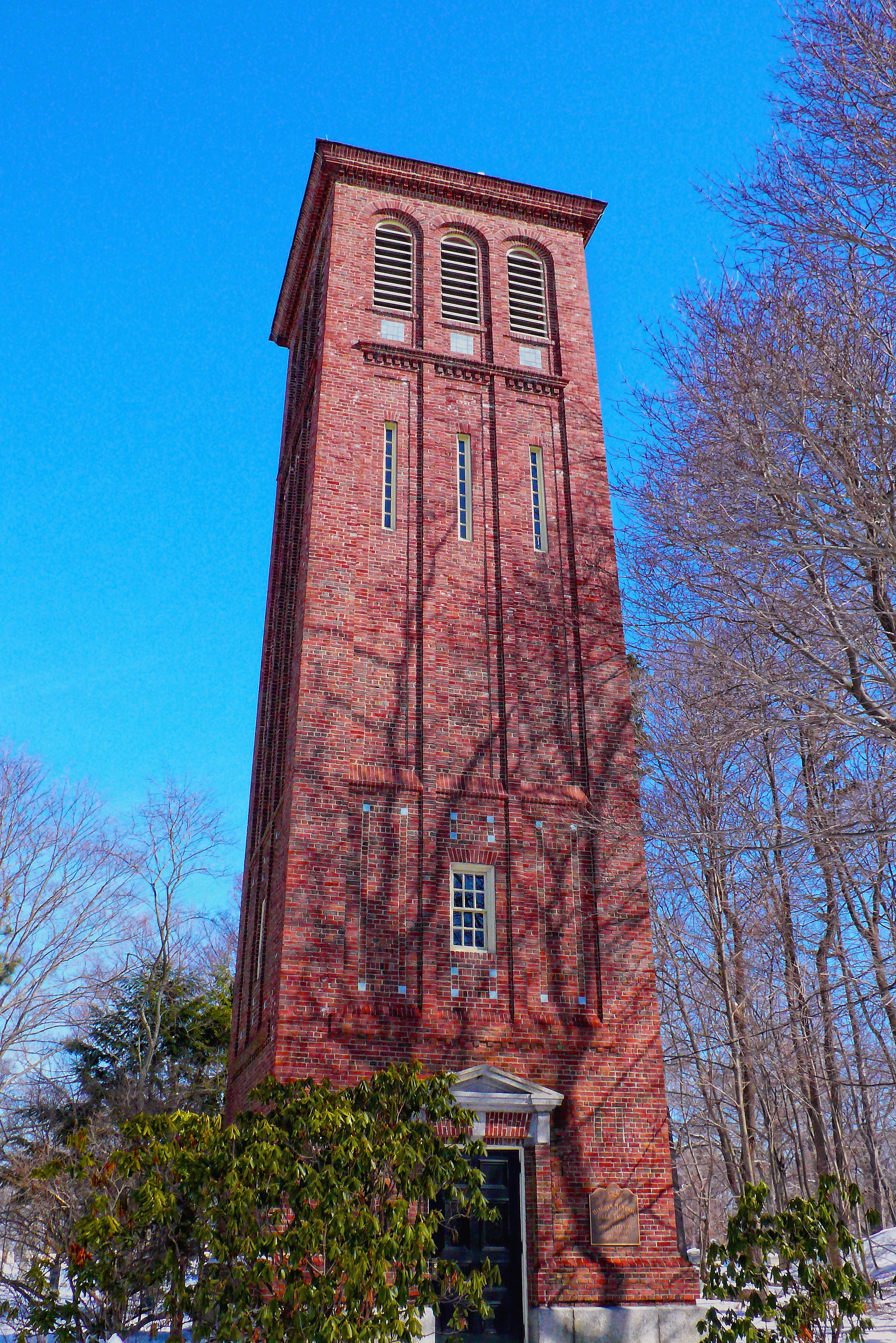

Also in the grounds, situated close to the church, is the Hingham Memorial Bell Tower, erected in 1912 to commemorate the 275th anniversary of the founding of Hingham, and in memory of the town's founders. The tower contains ten bells hung for change ringing, also made in 1912 by Mears & Stainbank, of Whitechapel, London. The bells were cast specifically in order to be similar to the bells hung in St Andrew's Church in Hingham, Norfolk, which the town's founders would have heard while living in England, and are tuned to the same key of E.

== Gallery ==
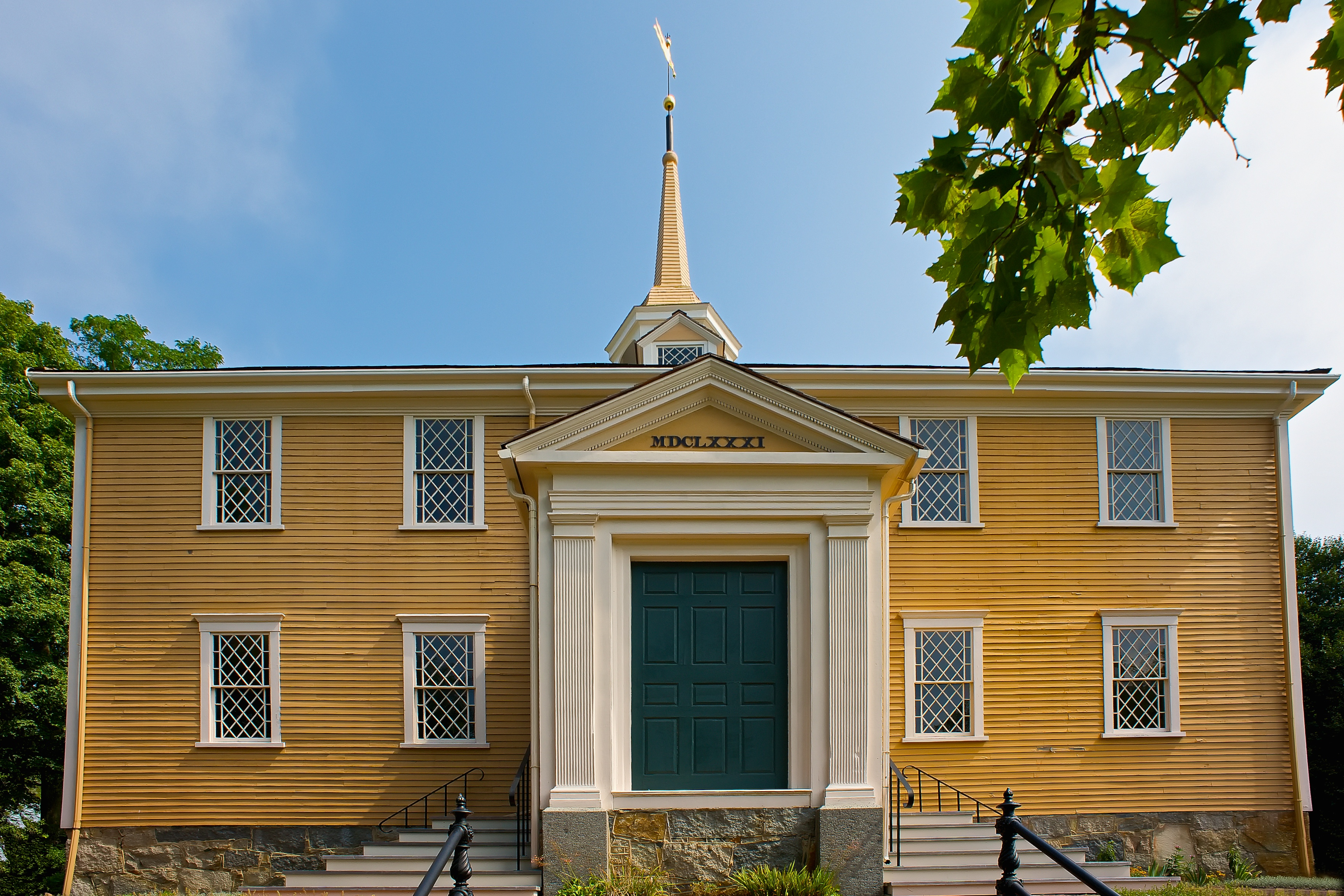
Entrance, with the date (1681)

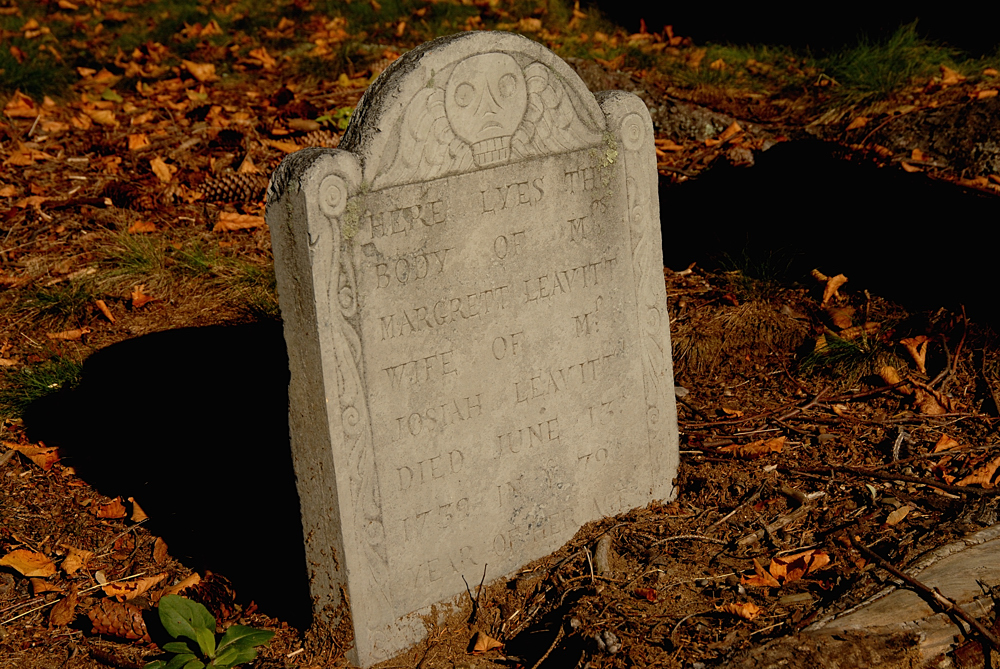
Gravestone of Margrett Leavitt, died June 13, 1739

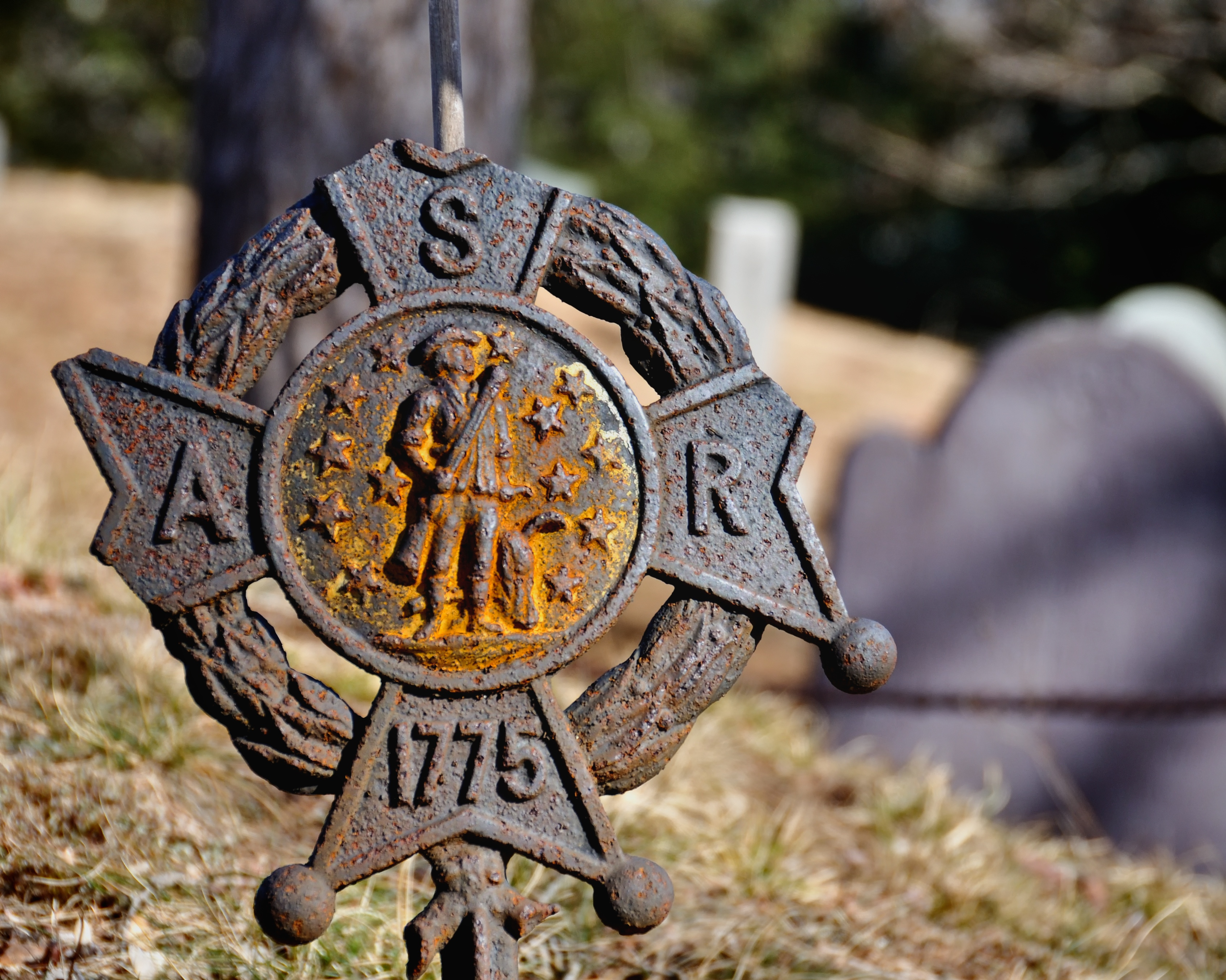
Sons of the American Revolution grave marker

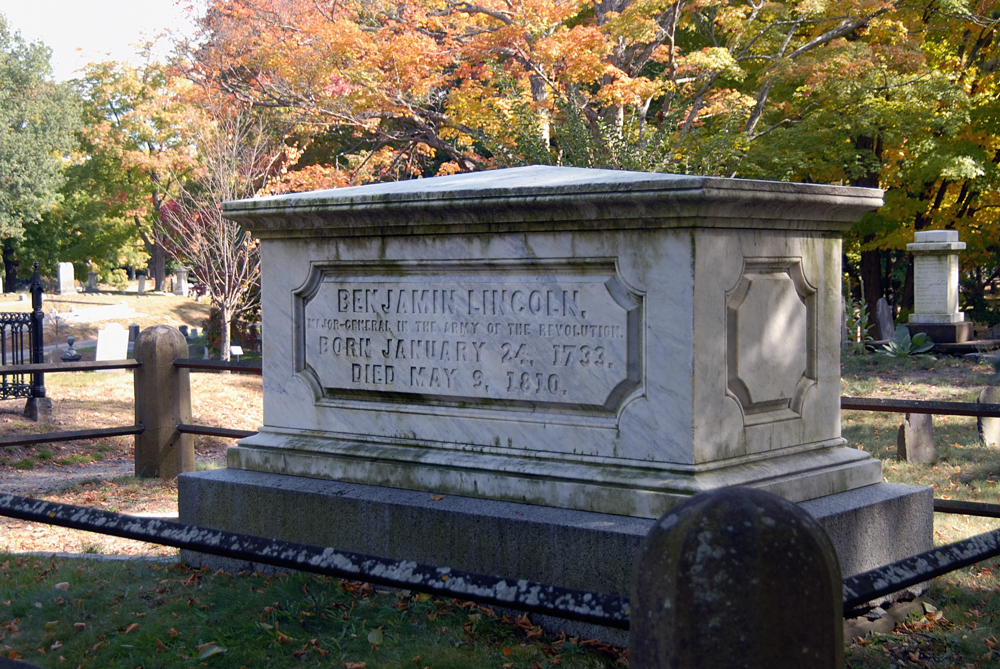
Tomb of Gen. Benjamin Lincoln, died May 9, 1810

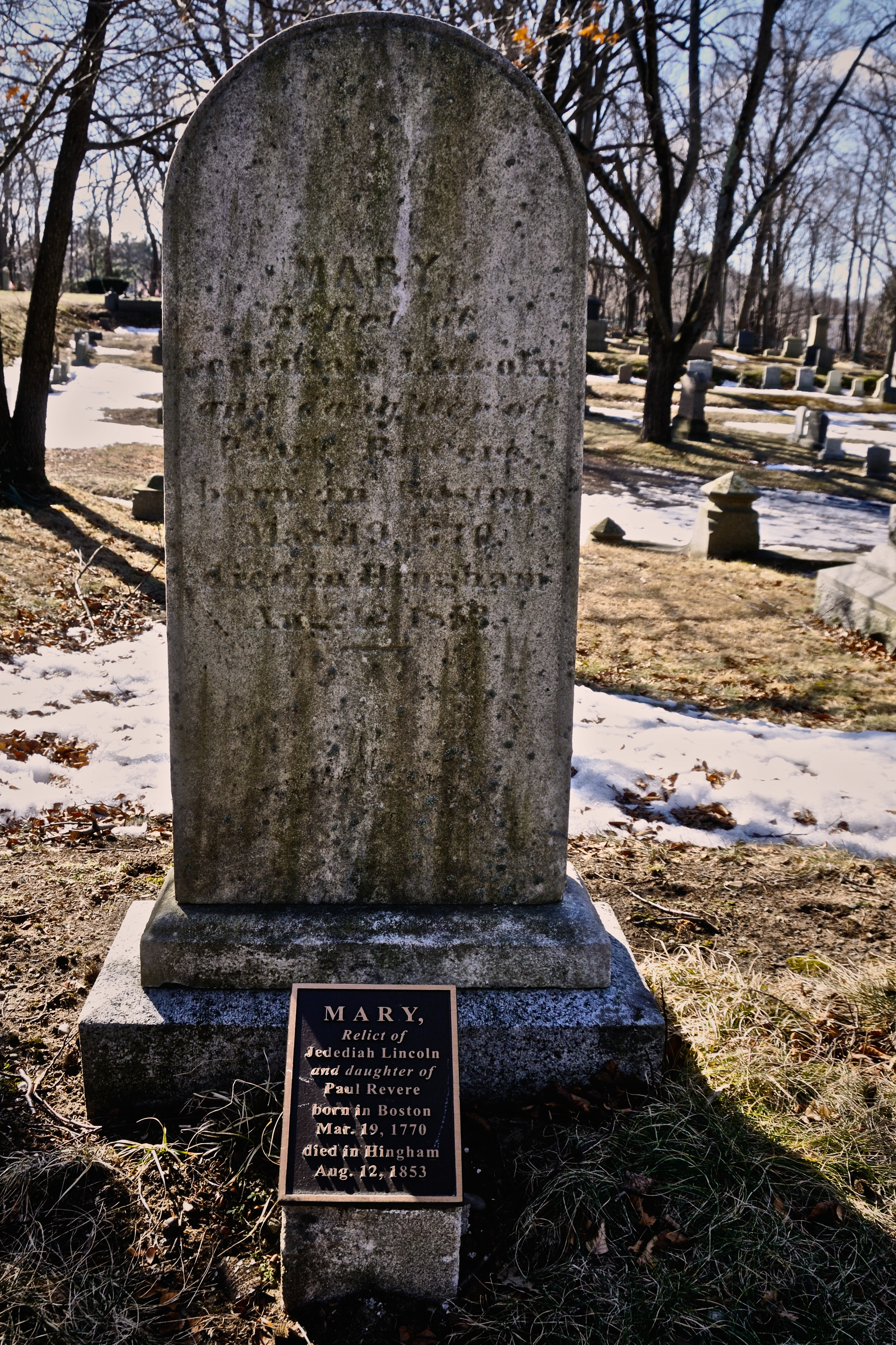
Gravestone of Mary Revere Lincoln, daughter of Paul Revere, died August 12, 1853

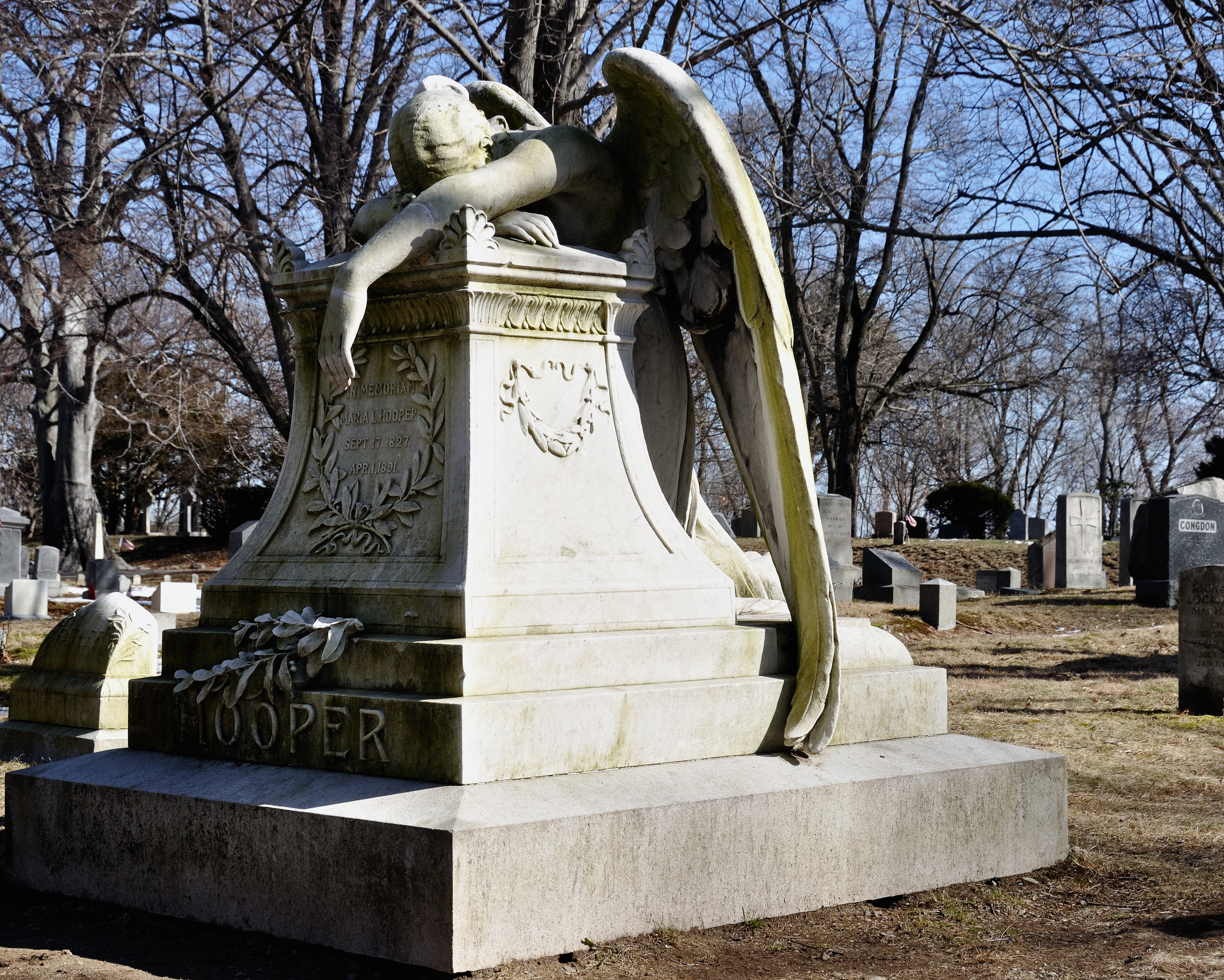
Angel of Grief, gravestone of Maria L. Hooper, died April 1, 1891

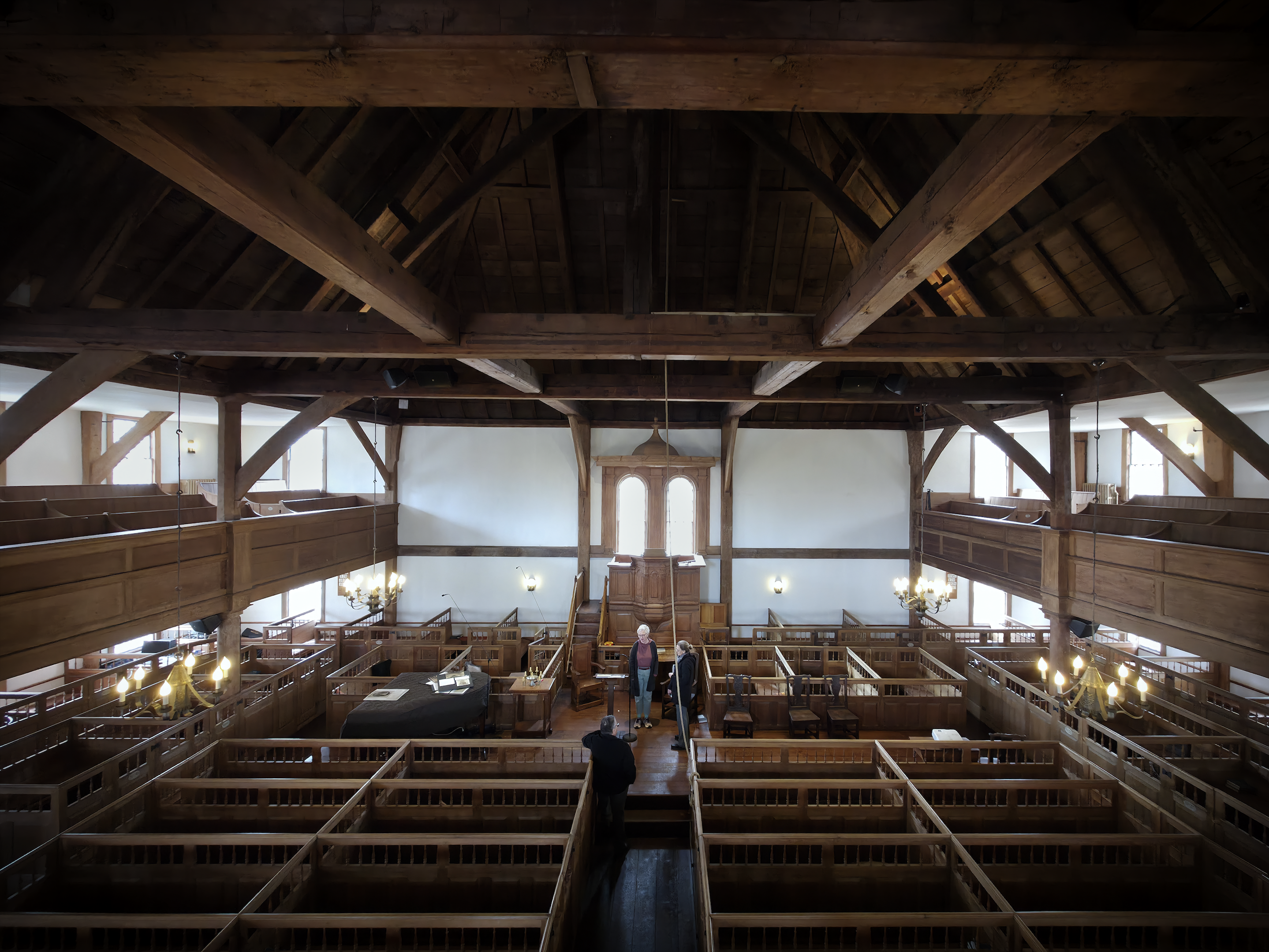
View from gallery

== See also ==
- List of National Historic Landmarks in Massachusetts
- National Register of Historic Places listings in Plymouth County, Massachusetts
- First Unitarian Church in Westport
- List of the oldest churches in the United States
