= Lincoln Historic District (Hingham, Massachusetts) =

Historic district in Massachusetts, United States

- U.S. National Register of Historic Places
- U.S. Historic district
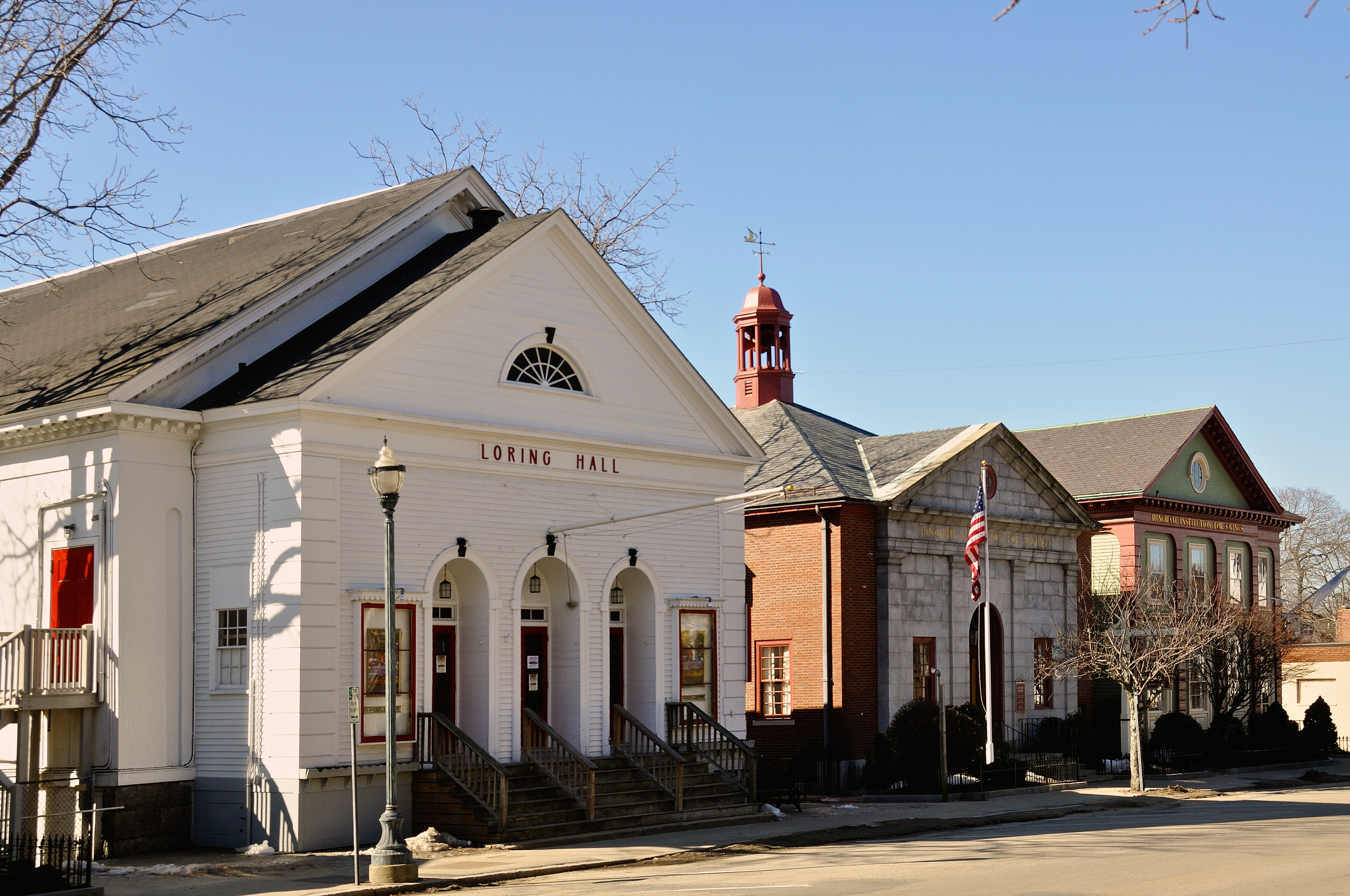
- Main Street

- Location within Massachusetts Location within the United States
- Location: Roughly, North & South Sts. from West to Water Sts., Main St. S to Garrison Rd., & Lincoln St. & Fearing Rd. N to Miles, Hingham, Massachusetts
- Coordinates: 42°14′23″N 70°53′27″W
- Area: 260 acres (110 ha)
- Architectural style: Early Republic, Late Victorian, Colonial
- NRHP reference No.: 90001728
- Added to NRHP: January 7, 1991

The Lincoln Historic District is a historic district in Hingham, Massachusetts, United States. It is roughly located on North and South Streets from West to Water Streets, Main Street south to Garrison Road, and Lincoln Street and Fearing Road north to Miles. It encompasses the earliest streets laid out in Hingham at the time of its founding in 1635, covering more than 300 years of development and a cross section of Hingham's architectural history. It includes some of the town's oldest buildings, including most notably the Old Ship Church and the General Benjamin Lincoln House, both National Historic Landmarks. The district takes its name from the large number of Lincolns who were among Hingham's early settlers.

The district features Early Republic, Late Victorian, and Colonial architecture and was added to the National Register of Historic Places in 1991.

== See also ==
- National Register of Historic Places listings in Plymouth County, Massachusetts
