= General Benjamin Lincoln House =

Historic house in Massachusetts, United States

- Gen. Benjamin Lincoln House
- U.S. National Register of Historic Places
- U.S. National Historic Landmark
- U.S. Historic district – Contributing property
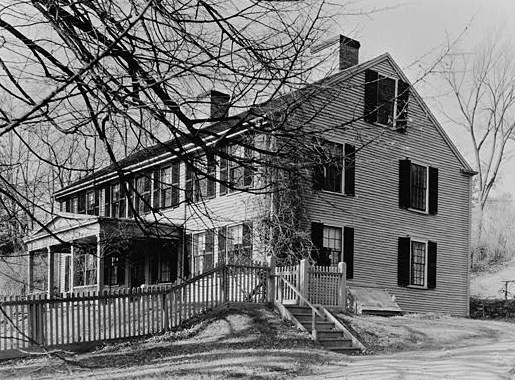
- HABS photo, 1936

- Location within Massachusetts Location within the United States
- Location: 181 North St., Hingham, Massachusetts
- Coordinates: 42°14′35″N 70°53′35″W
- Area: less than one acre
- Built: 1720s
- Architectural style: First Period; Georgian; Federal
- Part of: Lincoln Historic District (ID90001728)
- NRHP reference No.: 72001303

Significant dates
- Added to NRHP: November 28, 1972
- Designated CP: January 7, 1991

The General Benjamin Lincoln House is a National Historic Landmark at 181 North Street in Hingham, Massachusetts, United States. It was the birthplace and principal residence of Continental Army Major General Benjamin Lincoln (1733–1810), a well-respected military leader of the American Revolutionary War. The earliest standing portion of the house likely was built in the 1720s, partly with reused earlier materials. The last major modifications to the house were probably undertaken by General Lincoln in the late 18th century.

The house had remained in the hands of Lincoln family descendants but was sold to the Hingham Historical Society in 2020. Tours are available by appointment. Changes to the interior and exterior are authorized only in consultation with Historic New England, a major regional historic preservation organization.

== History of the house ==
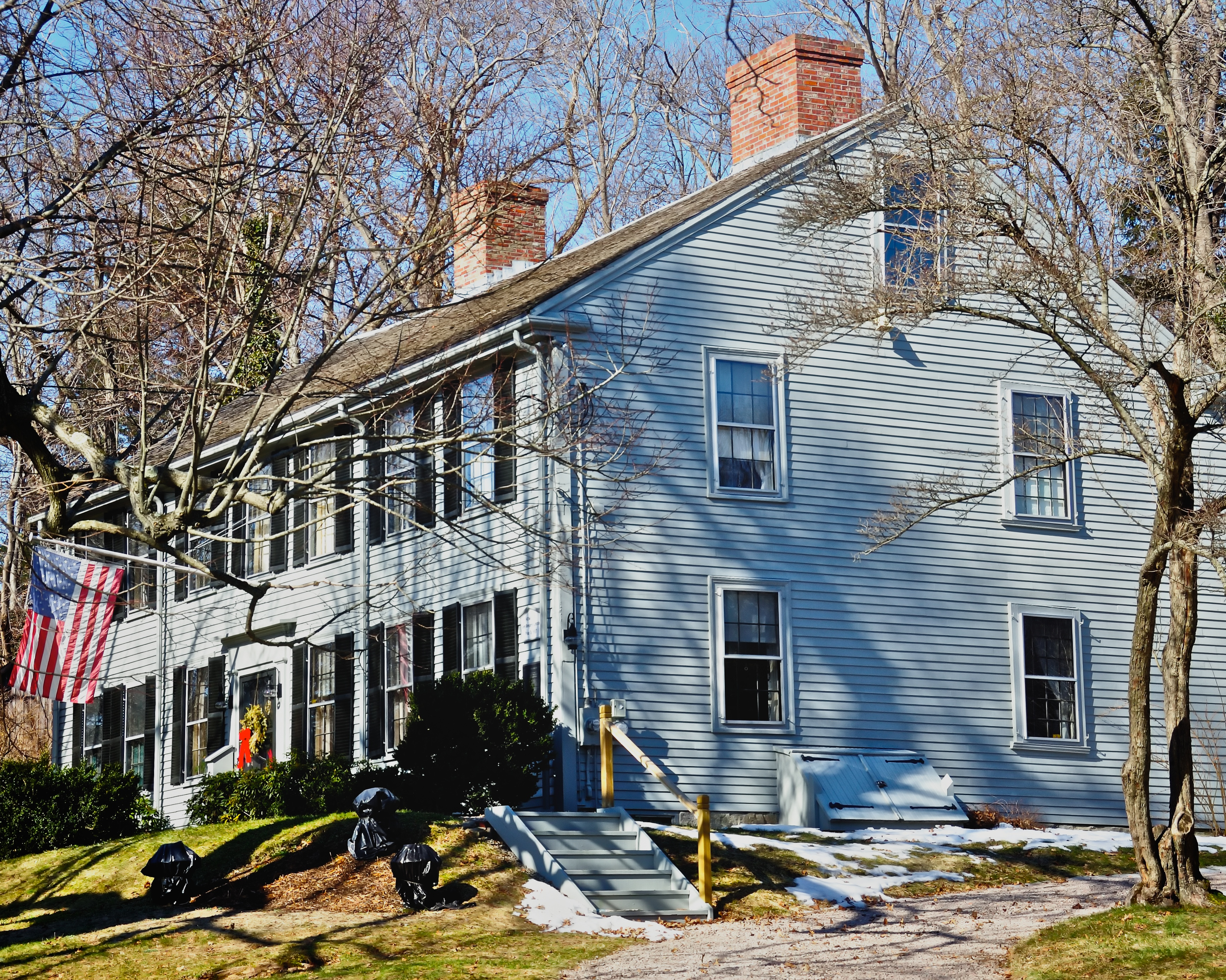
The Lincoln house in 2009; the front porch visible in the 1936 photo has been removed

According to the Hingham Historical Society, the house was built by Thomas “The Cooper” Lincoln (nicknamed to differentiate between other Thomas Lincolns in the area) in 1665. This date is unlikely given a dendrochronological study undertaken in 2020, which points to the early 1720s as the likely date of construction of the earliest standing portion, which includes some reused timbers from earlier buildings from trees felled in the early 1670s and ca. 1700. The building was expanded by General Lincoln in the late 18th century to its present configuration. A porch that was added in the late 19th century was removed in 1937, and represents the only significant alteration to the house since General Lincoln's time.

In 2009 Lincoln family descendants negotiated a preservation restriction agreement with Historic New England, a regional historic preservation society, to protect the interior and exterior character of the house. Exterior changes to the property are also restricted by the house's presence as a contributing property to Hingham's Lincoln Historic District.

In 2019, the last Lincoln descendants to live in the house decided to list it for sale. The Hingham Historical Society (HHS) expressed interest for purchasing the Lincoln House as a museum. Negotiations continued until June 2020, when the residents of Hingham approved the negotiated price of $772,000 at a special Town Meeting. In 2021, most of the contents were donated to HHS.

== Description ==
The Lincoln House stands a short way west of Hingham's central business district, just west of a triangular park formed at the junction of North and Lincoln Streets. It is a 2 1/2-story wood-frame structure, seven bays wide, with a side-gable roof, two interior chimneys, and clapboard siding, and rests on a granite foundation. Its main entrance is in the center of the south-facing facade, topped by a simple flat corniced pediment. The entrance opens into a central hall with stairs to the second floor. To its right are the main parlor in the front, with two smaller rooms behind, traditionally described (without evidence) as its 1637 kitchen and borning room. These rooms have paneled walls around the fireplaces, with that in the parlor decorated with blue Delft tile. To the left of the central hall is the former entry vestibule, with a winding staircase, and the dining room, also with a fully paneled fireplace wall. The house's kitchen is behind this room. There are a total of seven staircases, and there are seven bedrooms on the second floor.

== Benjamin Lincoln ==
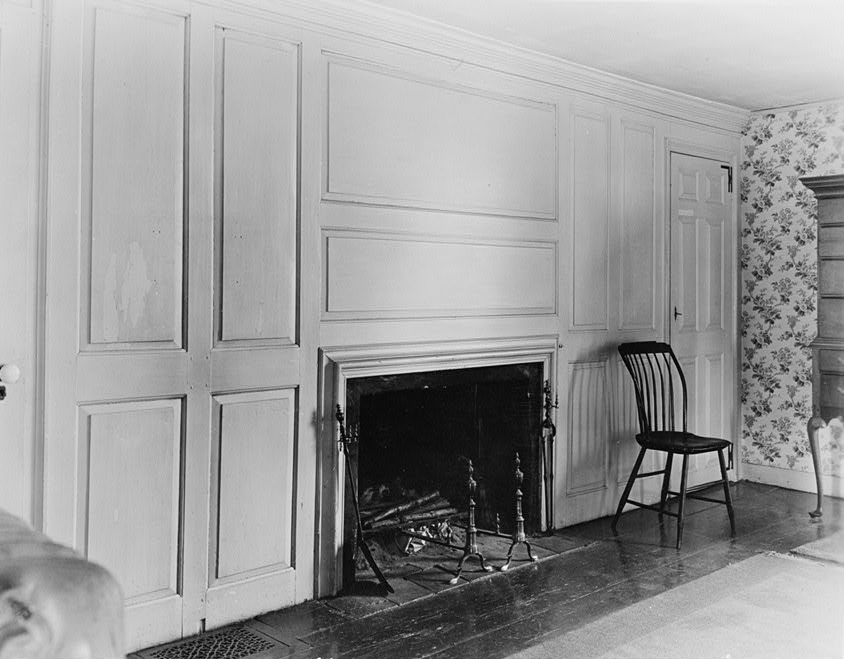
Photo of a bedroom (from the 1936 HABS survey)

Benjamin Lincoln was born in the house in 1733. He was active in local politics, and held positions of leadership in the militia of the Province of Massachusetts Bay. He became a major general in the Continental Army during the American Revolutionary War, in which he surrendered American forces at the Siege of Charleston in 1780, and was present at the British surrender at Yorktown in 1781.

General Lincoln then served as Secretary at War before returning to Massachusetts in 1783. He was then active in Massachusetts politics and military, leading militia that suppressed Shays' Rebellion in 1787, and served one term as lieutenant governor in 1788. He was for many years thereafter the federal collector at the Port of Boston.

== See also ==
- List of National Historic Landmarks in Massachusetts
- National Register of Historic Places listings in Plymouth County, Massachusetts
