= Unitarian Church in Westport =

Church in Fairfield, Connecticut, US

Coordinates: 41.17617°N 73.35794°W

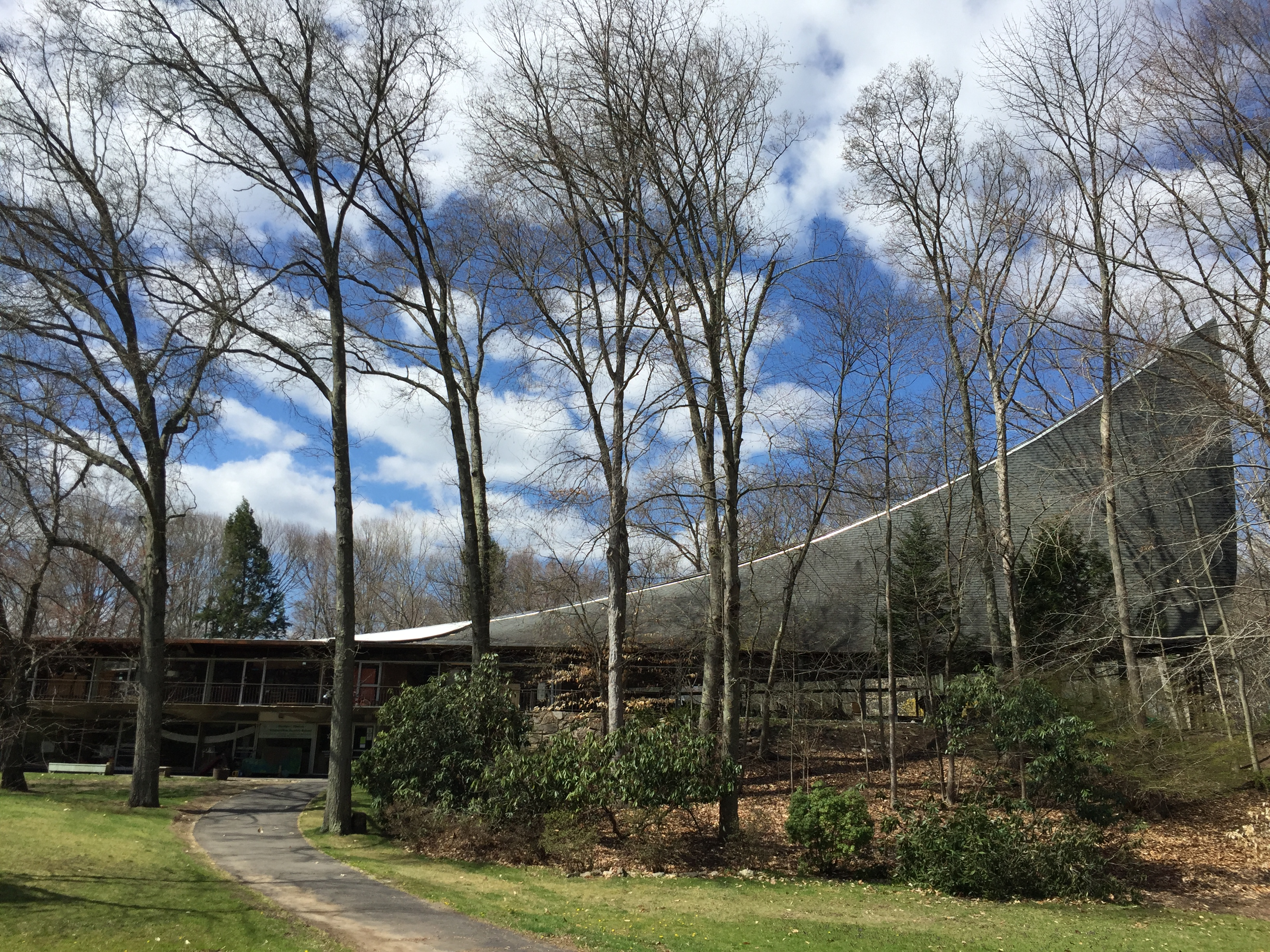
Unitarian Church in Westport sanctuary on right

The Unitarian Universalist Congregation in Westport is a large active Unitarian Universalist congregation in lower Fairfield that is a member of the Unitarian Universalist Association. Its dramatic building in Westport, Connecticut was designed by modernist architect Victor A. Lundy and completed in 1965. It won an award from Architect magazine. The congregation was founded in 1949 as "The First Unitarian Fellowship of Fairfield County" and changed its name to "The Unitarian Church in Westport" in 1964; in 2023 it changed it to "The Unitarian Universalist Congregation in Westport." The building has been compared to E. Fay Jones' Thorncrown Chapel (1980) and to the wooden tent Lundy designed for the interior of his Unitarian Meeting House (1964) in Hartford, Connecticut. Its nickname New Ship Church is a reference to the Old Ship Church built in 1681 in Hingham, Massachusetts.

== See also ==
- First Unitarian Society of Madison, Frank Lloyd Wright's church building in Madison Wisconsin.
