= Meeting house =

Building for religious, public, or private meetings

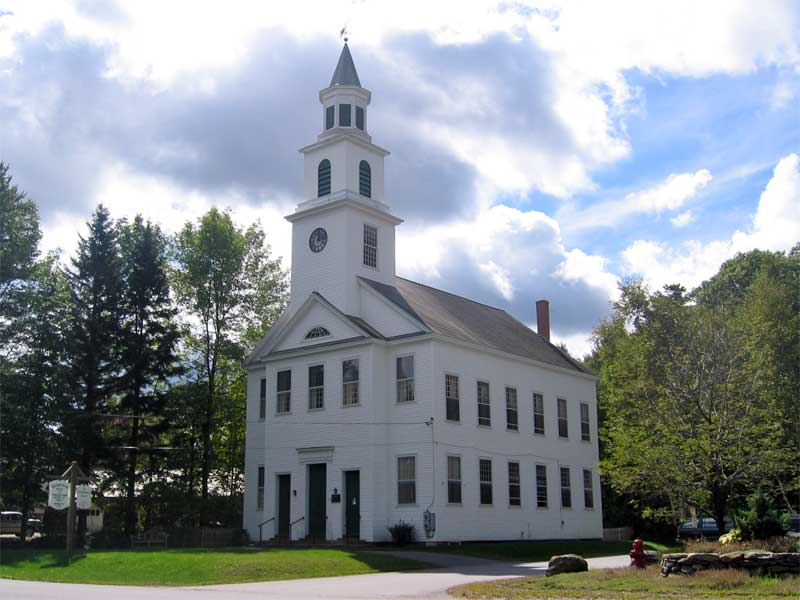
The small Vermont town of Marlboro rebuilt the Marlboro Meeting House Congregational Church after a fire in 1931.

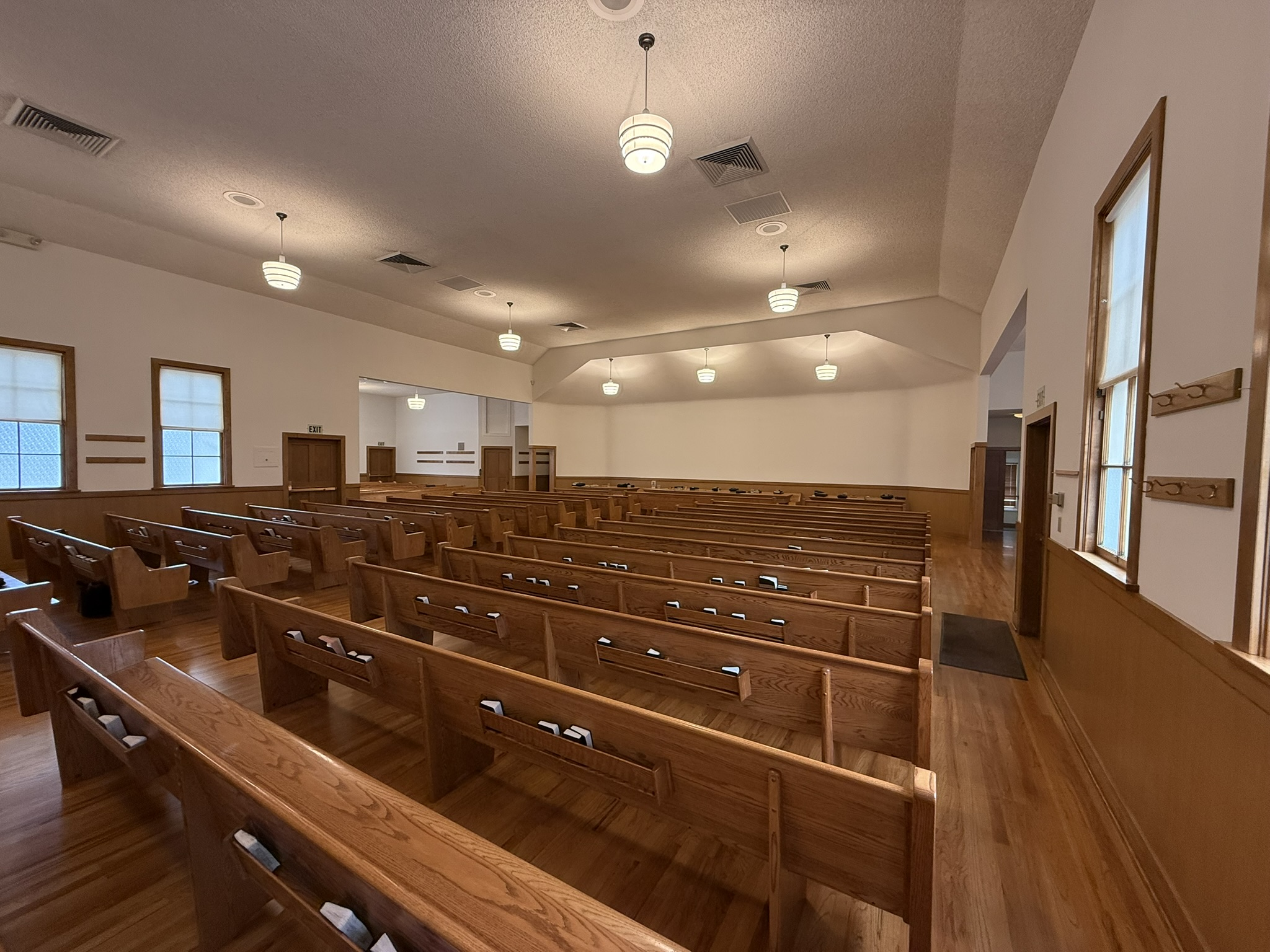
The interior of the meetinghouse of the Modesto Congeragation of the Old German Baptist Brethren Church, New Conference, a Schwarzenau Brethren Anabaptist denomination (Modesto, California)

A meeting house (also spelled meetinghouse or meeting-house) is a building for religious, public, or private meetings. It is primarily associated with Christian worship of certain movements after the Protestant Reformation of the 16th century, or later movements that developed on a Christian basis.

== Terminology ==
Nonconformist Protestant denominations distinguish between a church, which is a group of people who believe in Christ, and a meeting house or chapel, which is a building where the church meets.

In early Methodism, meeting houses were typically called "preaching houses" (to distinguish them from church houses, which hosted itinerant preachers).

== The meeting house in England ==
In England, where it originated, a meeting house is distinguished from a church or cathedral by being a place of worship for dissenters or nonconformists.

== Meeting houses in America ==
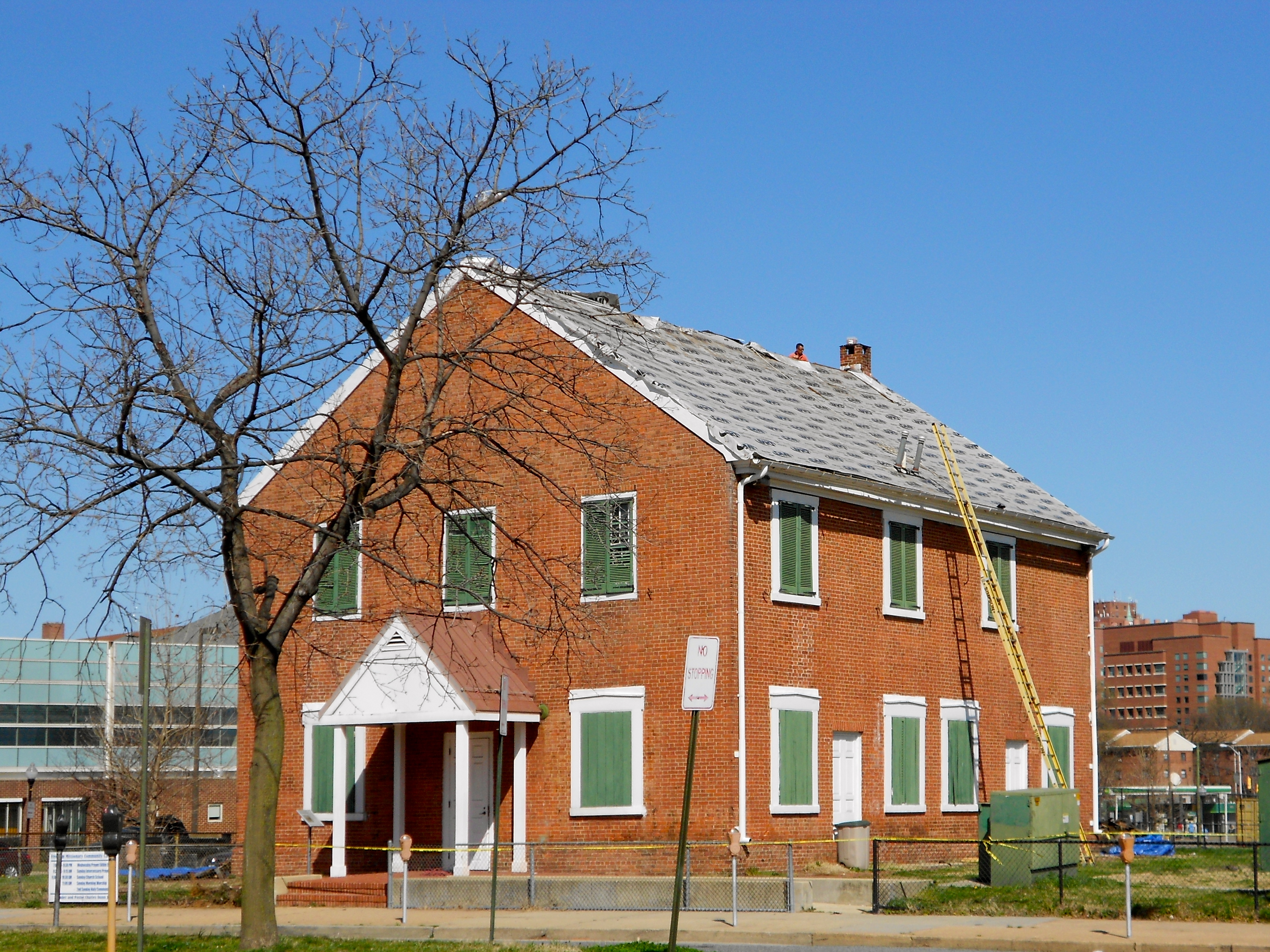
Old Town Friends' Meetinghouse in Baltimore

The colonial meeting house in America was typically the first public building erected as new villages sprang up. A meeting-house had a dual purpose as a place of worship and for public discourse, but sometimes only for "...the service of God." As the towns grew and the separation of church and state in the United States matured, the buildings that were used as the seat of local government were called town-houses or town-halls. Most communities in modern New England still have active meetinghouses, which are popular points of assembly for town meeting days and other events.

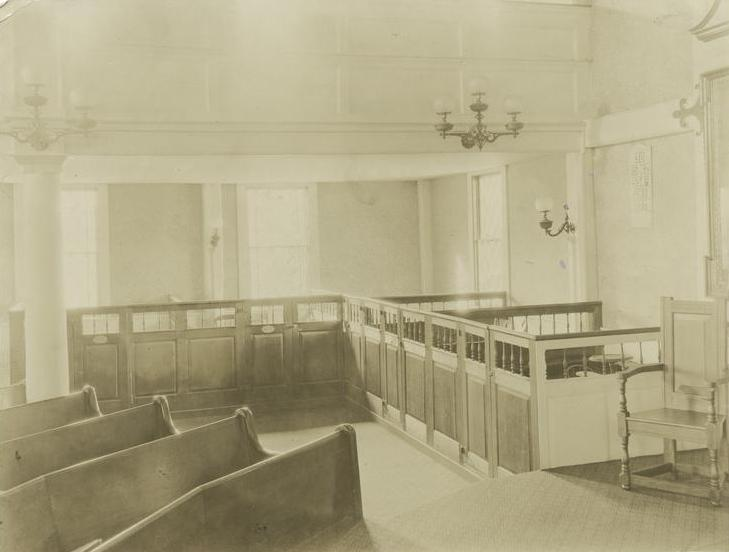
Sheep-pen pews, Old Ship Meeting house, Hingham, Massachusetts, ca. 1880

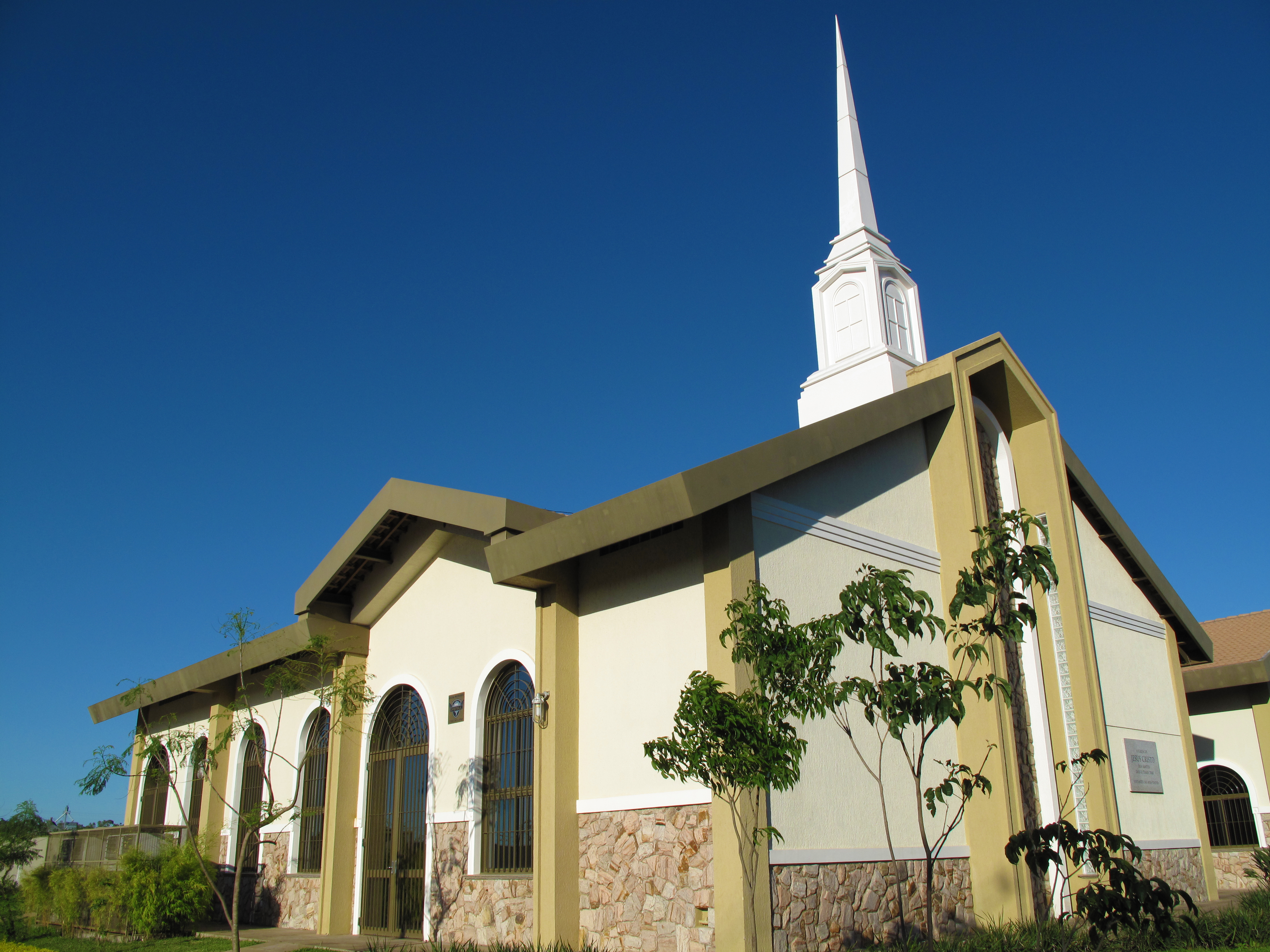
A meetinghouse of the Church of Jesus Christ of Latter-day Saints in Uruguaiana, Brazil, used for weekly services

The nonconformist meeting houses generally do not have steeples, with the term "steeplehouses" referring to traditional or establishment religious buildings. Christian denominations or religions with Christian roots that use the term "meeting house" to refer to the building in which they hold their worship include:

- Anabaptist congregations
  - Amish congregations
  - Mennonite congregations
- Congregational churches have a congregation-based system of church governance. They also use the term "mouth-houses" to emphasize their use as a place for discourse and discussion.
- Christadelphians
- The Church of Jesus Christ of Latter-day Saints uses the term "Meetinghouse" for the building where congregations meet for weekly worship services, recreational events, and social gatherings. A meetinghouse differs from an LDS temple, which is reserved for special forms of worship.
- A provisional movement
- Religious Society of Friends (Quakers), see Friends meeting houses
- Spiritual Christians from Russia
- Some Unitarian congregations, although some prefer the term "chapel" or "church".
- Some Unitarian Universalist congregations
- The Unification Church

== See also ==
- Moot hall
- Chapel § Modern usage
- Kingdom Hall

== Sources ==
- Congdon, Herbert Wheaton. Old Vermont Houses 1763–1850. William L. Bauhan: 1940, 1973. ISBN 978-0-87233-001-6.
- Duffy, John J., et al. Vermont: An Illustrated History. American Historical Press: 2000. ISBN 978-1-892724-08-3.
- Lindley, Kenneth. Chapels and Meeting Houses. John Baker: 1969. with a foreword by John Piper.
- Media related to Category:Meeting houses at Wikimedia Commons
