= Mouth-house =

Mouth-house is an English translation of the German Mundhaus, a term used by Martin Luther for a Protestant Christian church, emphasizing that God's word and God's salvation is an acoustical affair. Mouth-house is another term for a meeting house.

In American Puritan and Congregational churches, their church buildings are termed mouth-houses to signify their purpose as places of public meeting and expression, augmenting their use as places of worship. Old South Meeting House in Boston, termed a mouth-house, was the site of public debate about the American Revolution, the planning of the Boston Tea Party, as well as debate on the issues of slavery, Abolitionism, the Vietnam War, and Iraq War.

== Sources ==
- Thornton, John F. and Susan B. Varenne, editors. Faith and Freedom, An Invitation to the Writings of Martin Luther. Random House, Inc.: 2002. ISBN 978-0-375-71376-7.
