= Samuel Thaxter =

Influential citizen in Plymouth, New England

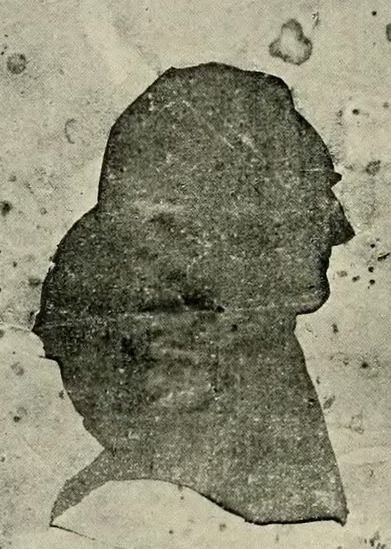
- Born: 6 August 1665
- Died: 13 November 1740
- Occupation: Politician
- Mother: Elizabeth Thaxter

Col. Samuel Thaxter (1665–1740), of Hingham, Province of Massachusetts Bay, was one of the most prominent and influential citizens in Plymouth, New England. He was a member of the commission to settle the boundary between Massachusetts and Rhode Island in 1719. He commanded the Ancient and Honorable Artillery Company of Massachusetts in 1728. His son Samuel Thaxter Jr. (1695–1732) married Mary Hawke (1711–1798), the mother of John Hancock (signer of the Declaration of Independence).

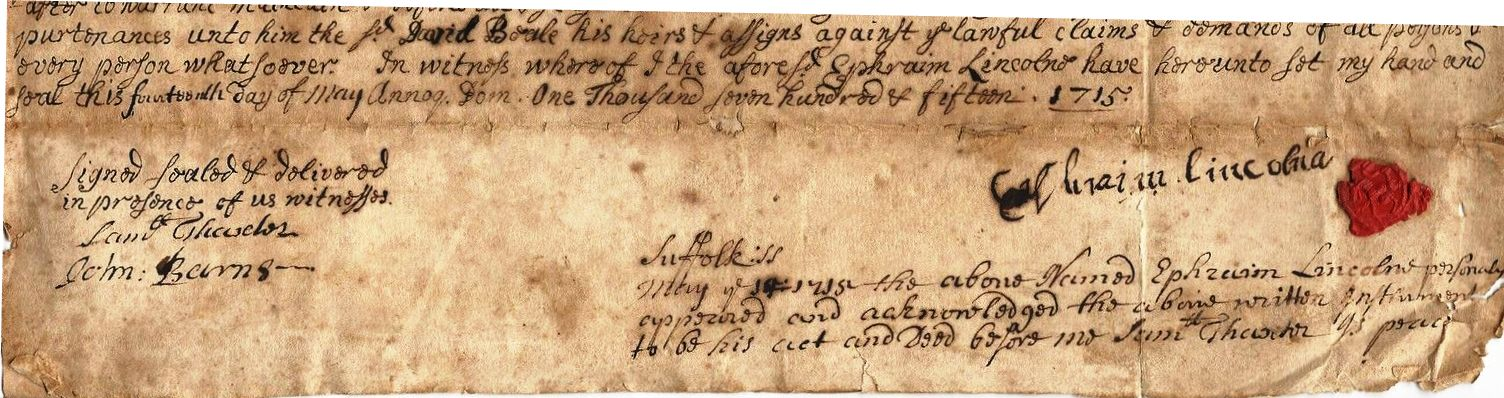
A 1715 deed signed and recorded by Samuel Thaxter, a property of Dr. Shiwei Jiang of Virginia

Thaxter was Colonel of the Hingham regiment of militia and one of His Majesty's Council; magistrate, justice of the peace; delegate to the General Court 1697, and from 1708 to 1712 inc., also from 1711 to 1718 inc.; an assistant, and otherwise distinguished in public posts; selectman 1695, 1705, 1706, and 1717.

Coat of Arms of Samuel Thaxter

His father, Lieutenant John Thaxter (1625/26–1686/87), served as selectman and representative to the General Court in the mid-1600s. In 1664 while serving against the Dutch at New York, he was made Lieutenant under orders from Richard Cromwell. He was later promoted to captain and commanded a troop of cavalry.

Thaxter's grandfather, Deacon Thomas Thaxter, was the first person of the name in America. Thaxter had not inherited a very large estate from his family. But by his industry and enterprise, he became Hingham's most wealthy and influential citizen. He died at 76 years old and was buried in Hingham Cemetery.
