= Timeline of Lynn, Massachusetts =

The following is a timeline of the history of Lynn, Massachusetts, USA.

== 17th-18th century ==
- 1629 - Saugus founded. Among the founders — Edmund Ingalls
- 1637 - Saugus renamed to Lynn in honor of Reverend Samuel Whiting (Senior), Lynn's first official minister who arrived from King's Lynn.
- 1642 - Saugus Iron Works in business.
- 1644 - Reading separates from Lynn.
- 1720 - Lynnfield burying-ground established.
- 1732 - Saugus burying-ground established.
- 1782 - Lynnfield separates from Lynn.
- 1793 - Post office in operation.
- 1797 - Population: 2,291.

== 19th century ==
- 1803 - Floating Bridge constructed on Salem-Boston turnpike.
- 1810 - Population: 4,087.
- 1812 - Eastern Burial-Place established.
- 1814 - Town House built.
- 1815
  - Saugus separates from Lynn.
  - Social Library formed.

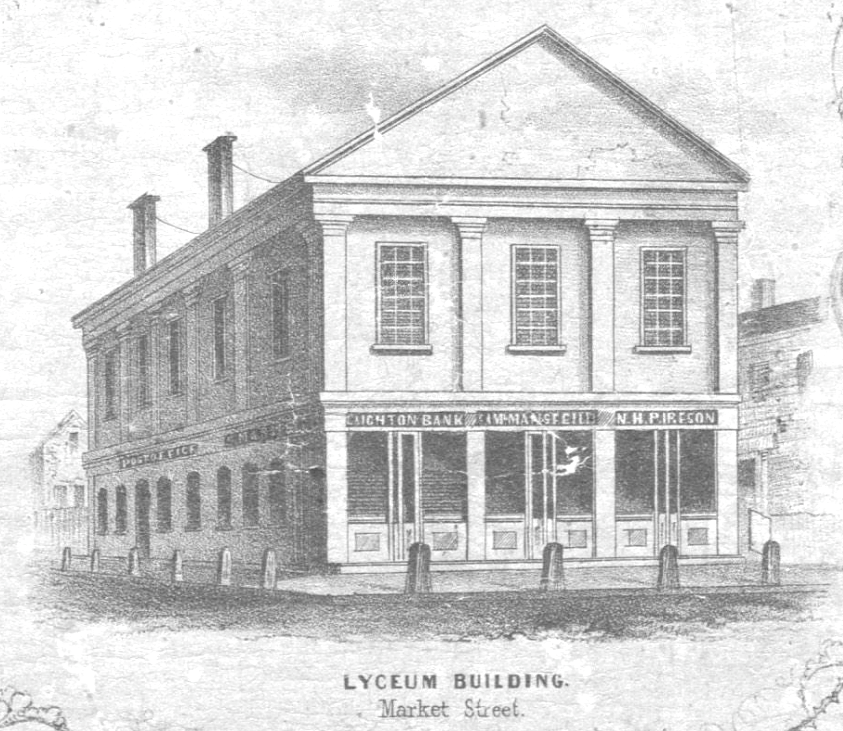
Lyceum building

- 1830 - Lynn Record newspaper begins publication.
- 1838
  - Eastern Railroad in operation.
  - Lynn Natural History Society formed.
- 1840 - Population: 9,367.
- 1841
  - Lyceum building constructed.
  - Frederick Douglass moves to Lynn.
  - September 28 - Frederick Douglass is thrown off the Eastern Railroad train at Lynn Central Square station for refusing to sit in the segregated coach
- 1845 Frederick Douglass writes his first autobiography Narrative of the Life of Frederick Douglass, an American Slave while living in Lynn
- 1847 - High Rock Cottage (also called "Stone Cottage") is built by Alonzo Lewis for Jesse Hutchinson
- 1848 - First High Rock Tower built.
- 1850
  - May 14 - City of Lynn incorporated.
  - George Hood becomes mayor.
  - Pine Grove Cemetery consecrated.
- 1851 - First High School built.
- 1852
  - May - Swampscott separates from Lynn.
  - June - Benjamin Franklin Mudge becomes mayor.
- 1853
  - February - Saugus Branch Railroad opens for passengers with four stations in Lynn. Lynn's Andrews Breed is the railroad's first superintendent.
  - March - Nahant separates from Lynn.
  - April - Daniel C. Baker becomes mayor.

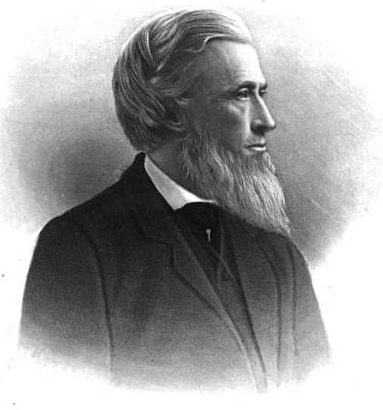
Ezra W. Mudge

- 1854 - Lynn Weekly Reporter newspaper begins publication.
- 1855
  - Andrews Breed becomes mayor.
  - Lynn Library Association organized.
- 1856
  - Ezra W. Mudge becomes mayor.
  - African Methodist Episcopal Church established.
- 1858
  - William F. Johnson becomes mayor.
  - Telegraph in service.
  - St. Mary's Cemetery consecrated.
- 1859 - Edward S. Davis becomes mayor.
- 1860 - 1860 New England Shoemakers Strike begins in Lynn
- 1861 - Hiram N. Breed becomes mayor.
- 1862
  - Peter M. Neal becomes mayor.
  - Free Public Library established.
- 1863 - Boston & Lynn Horse Railroad begins operating.
- 1865
  - April 19 - original High Rock Tower destroyed by fire
- 1866
  - Roland G. Usher becomes mayor.
  - Mary Baker Eddy experiences the fall in Lynn, believed by Christian Scientists to mark the birth of their religion.

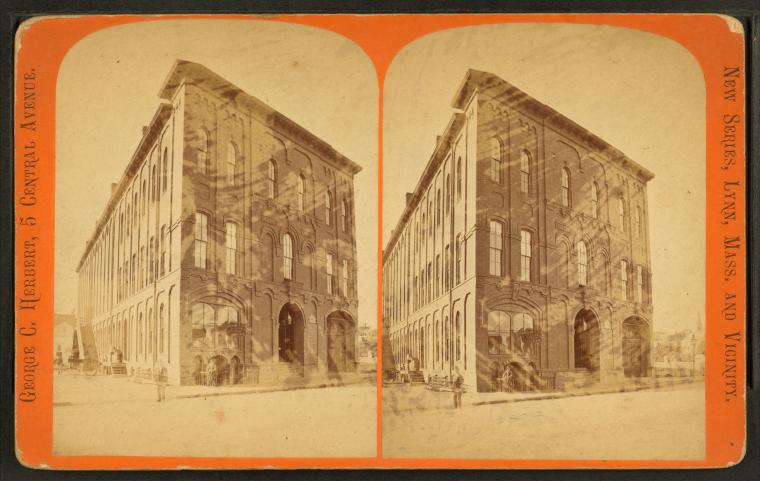
Music Hall

- 1867
  - City Hall dedicated.
  - Lynn Transcript newspaper begins publication.
- 1868 - Young Men's Christian Association organized.
- 1870
  - Edwin Walden becomes mayor.
  - Music Hall opens.
- 1872
  - Labor strike by shoemakers.
  - James N. Buffum becomes mayor.
  - Odd Fellows Hall built.
  - Boston, Revere Beach & Lynn Railroad chartered.
- 1873
  - Jacob M. Lewis becomes mayor.
  - Soldiers' Monument installed.
- 1876 - Lynn City Item newspaper begins publication.
- 1877 - Samuel M. Bubier becomes mayor.

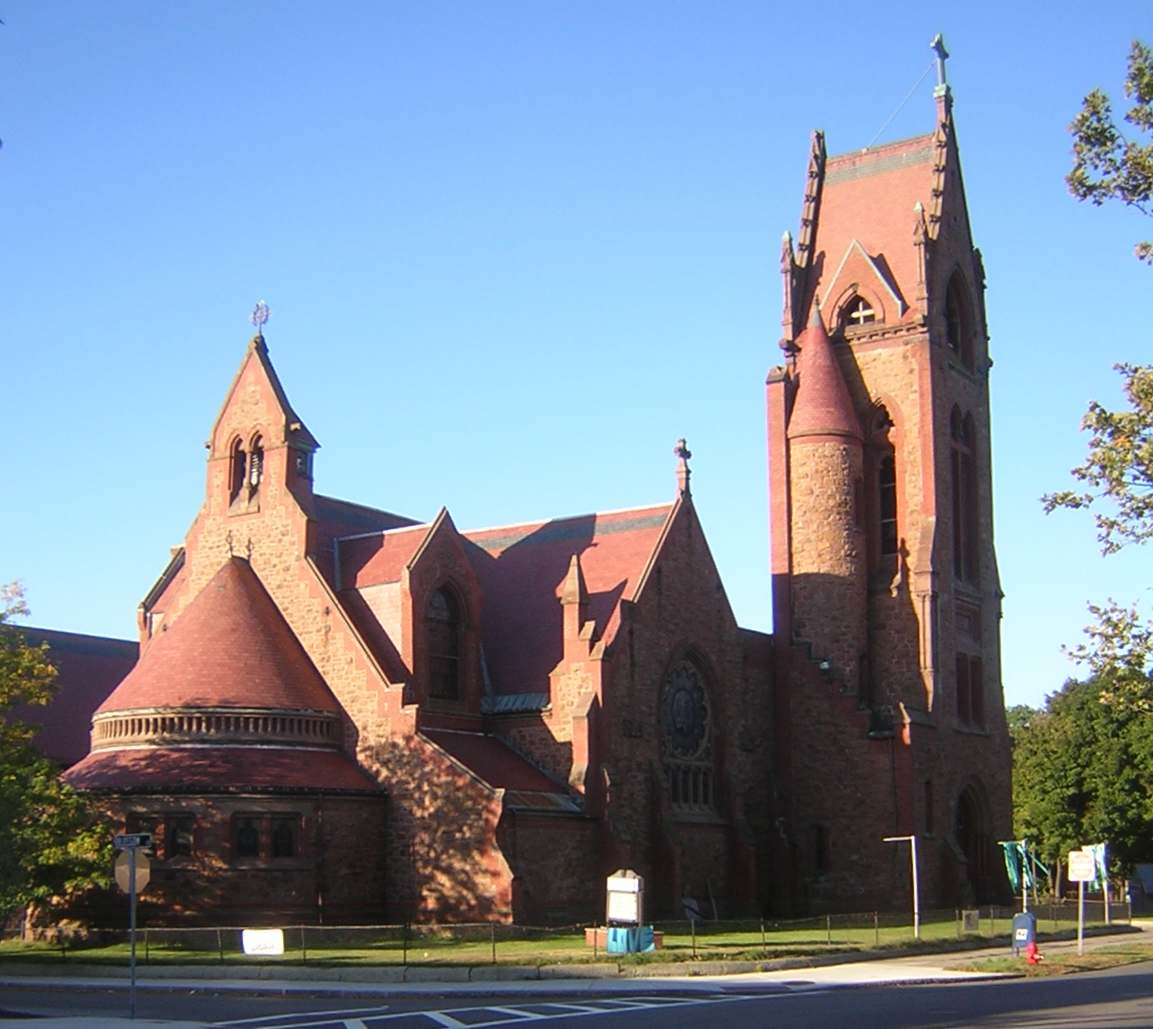
St. Stephen's Memorial Episcopal Church

- 1879
  - January - George Plaisted Sanderson becomes mayor.
  - June - 250th anniversary of settlement.
- 1880 - Lynn Masonic Hall built.
- 1881
  - Henry B. Lovering elected mayor.
  - Lynn Woods established.
  - St. Stephen's Memorial Episcopal Church built.
  - Saint Mary's Boys High School established.

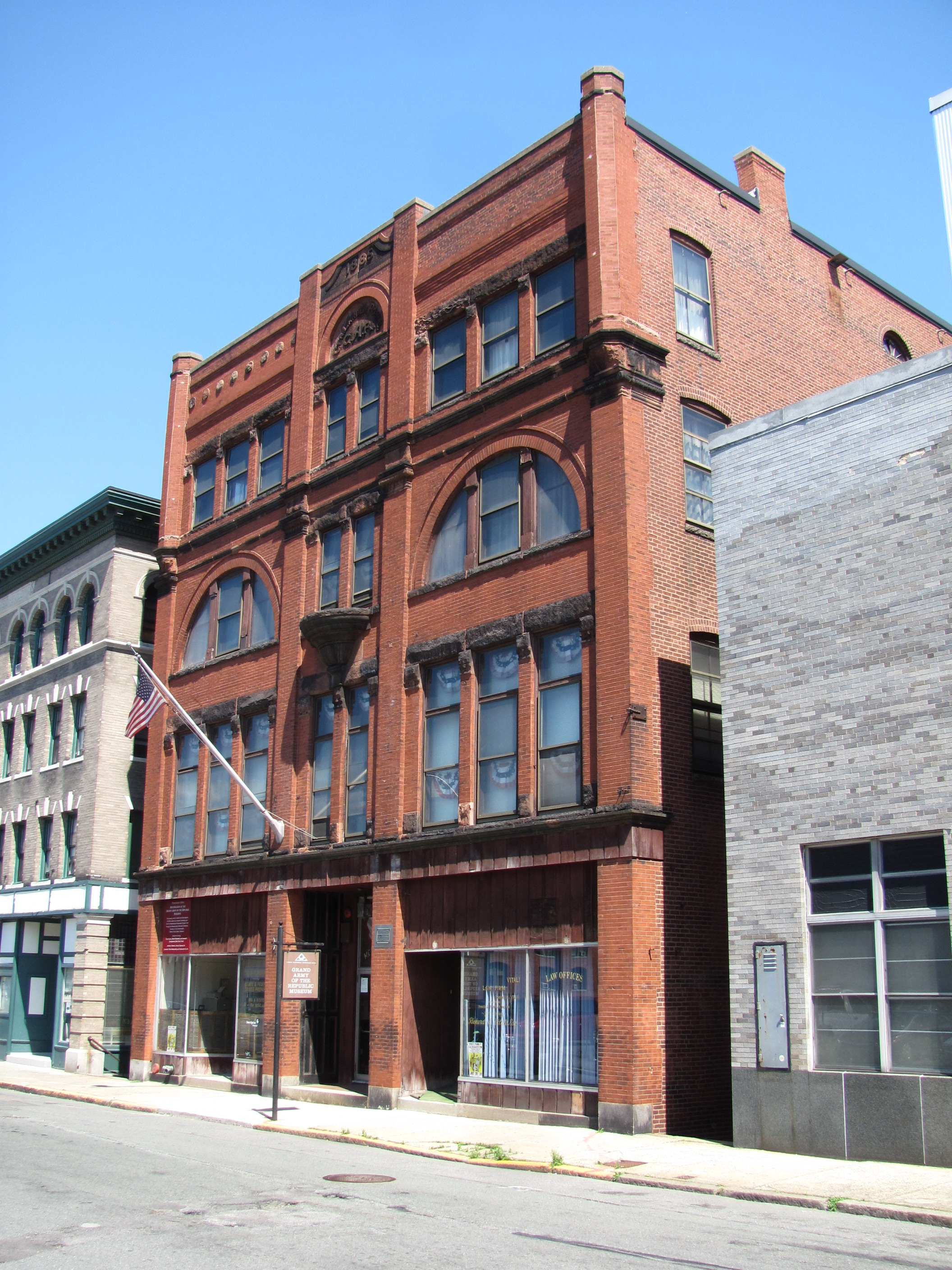
G.A.R. Hall and Museum

- 1882 - Lynn's Henry B. Lovering is elected to the United States House of Representatives.
- 1883
  - William L. Baird becomes mayor.
  - Thomson-Houston Electric Company in business.
- 1885
  - John R. Baldwin becomes mayor.
  - G.A.R. Hall built.
- 1886 - George D. Hart becomes mayor.
- 1887
  - English High School established.
  - Henry Cabot Lodge becomes Massachusetts's 6th congressional district representative.
- 1888
  - March 11–14 Lynn and all of Massachusetts are crippled by the Great Blizzard of 1888
  - George C. Higgins becomes mayor.
  - Thomson-Houston Electric Company powers the first electric streetcar in Massachusetts: the Highland Circuit of the Lynn & Boston Railway Company
- 1889
  - Asa T. Newhall becomes mayor.
  - A fire sweeps through the downtown, destroying a large swath of commercial and retail space.
- 1890 - Fabens Building and Tapley Building constructed.
- 1891
  - E. Knowlton Fogg becomes mayor.
  - Lynn Bank Block and Mowers' Block built.
- 1892
  - Elihu B. Hayes becomes mayor.
  - General Electric formed by a merger of Edison General Electric Company of Schenectady, New York and Thomson-Houston Electric Company of Lynn.
  - Lynn English High School on Essex Street opens
  - Lynn Classical High School opened.
- 1893 - Lynn Armory built.

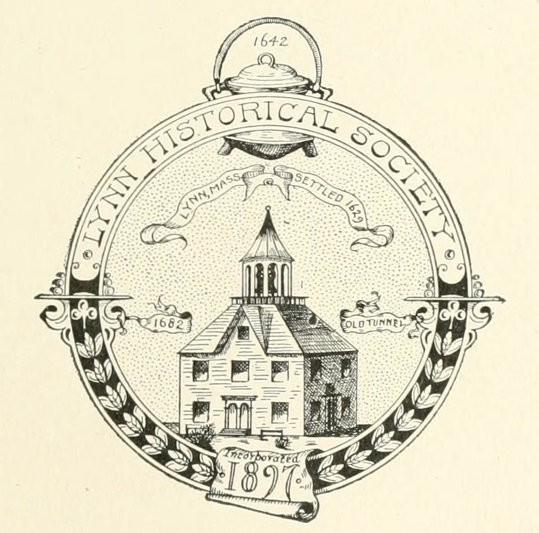
Emblem of Lynn Historical Society, 1898

- 1894 - Charles E. Harwood becomes mayor.
- 1895 - Boston and Maine's Central Square station rebuilt.
- 1896
  - Eugene A. Besson becomes mayor.
  - Post Office built.
- 1897
  - Walter L. Ramsdell becomes mayor.
  - Lynn Historical Society incorporated.
- 1898 - Lynn Public Library built.
- 1899 - William Shepherd becomes mayor.

== 20th century ==
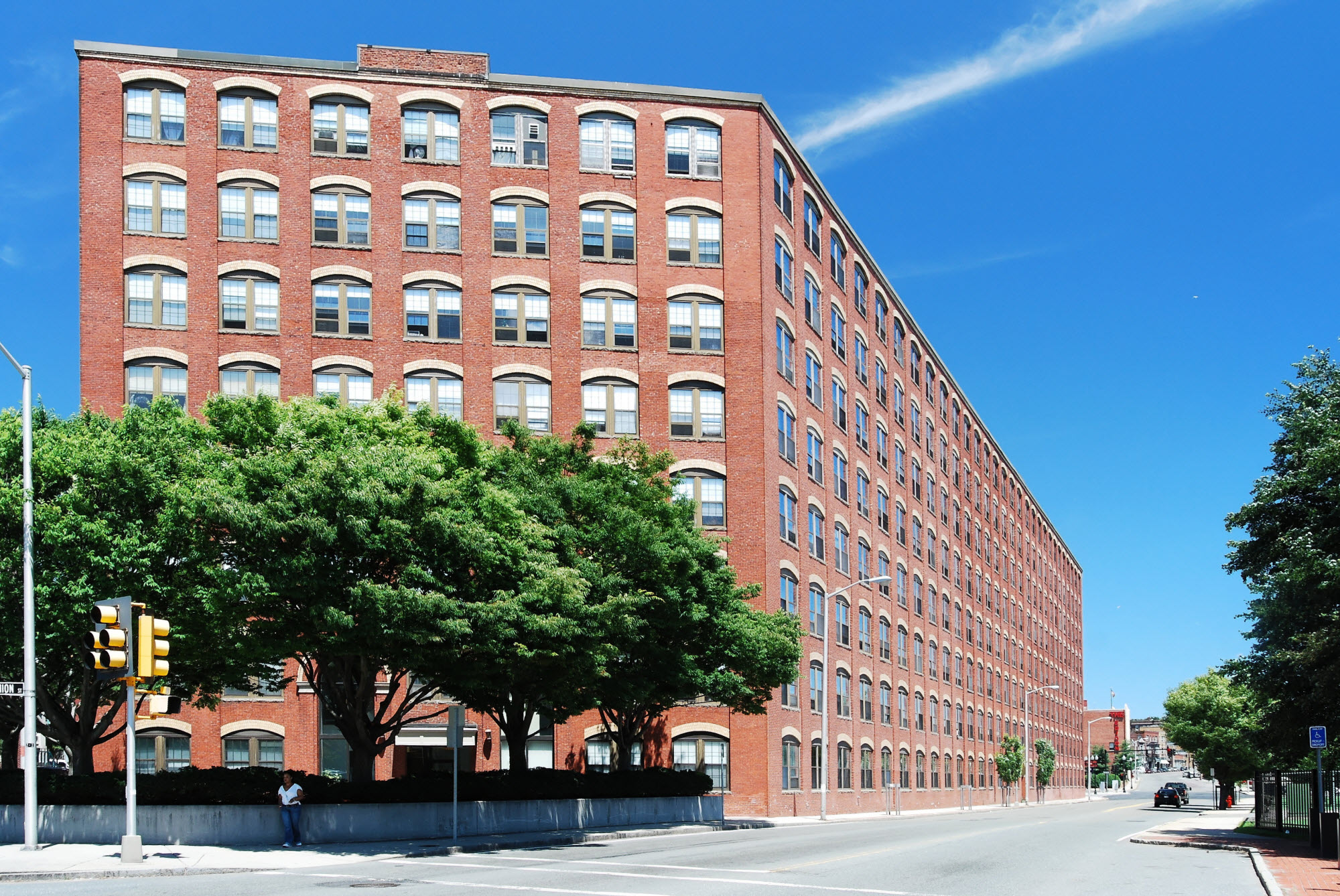
Vamp Building

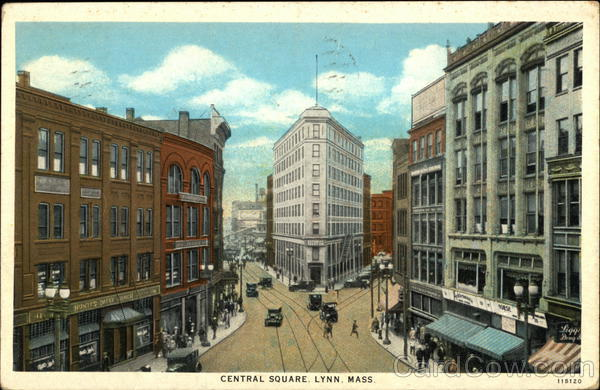
Central Square, c. 1920

- 1900 - Population: 68,513.
- 1903
  - Henry W. Eastham becomes mayor.
  - Vamp Building constructed.
- 1904
  - second High Rock Tower constructed
- 1905
  - St. Michael the Archangel Parish established.
  - 431 factories in Lynn.
- 1906 - Charles Neal Barney becomes mayor.
- 1907 Lynndyl, Utah, a town named after Lynn, is founded.
- 1908 - Thomas F. Porter becomes mayor.
- 1909 - James E. Rich becomes mayor.
- 1910 - Population: 89,336.
- 1911 - William P. Connery, Sr. becomes mayor.
- 1913
  - George H. Newhall becomes mayor.
  - Chamber of Commerce established.

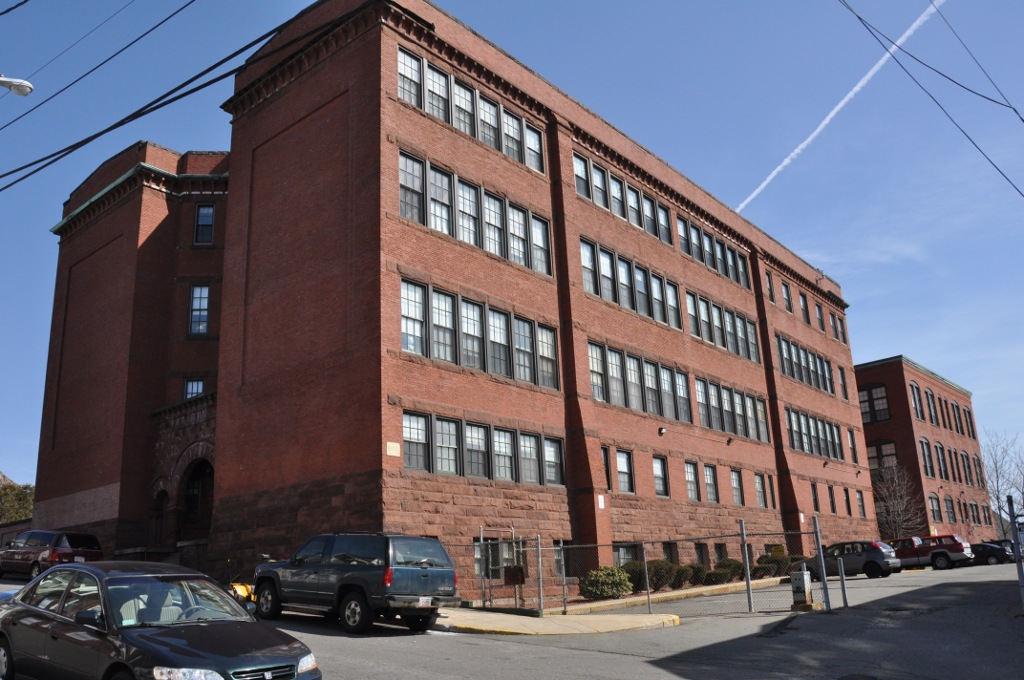
English High School 1916 section

- 1916 - James Street addition to the original Lynn English High School opens
- 1918 - Walter H. Creamer becomes mayor.

Walter H. Creamer

- 1921 - Bridge rebuilt on Salem-Boston turnpike.
- 1922
  - Harland A. McPhetres becomes mayor.
  - Lynn's William P. Connery, Jr. is elected to the United States House of Representatives.
- 1924
  - March 29 - Fire destroys the 1892 portion of the original Lynn English High School
- 1926 - Ralph S. Bauer becomes mayor.

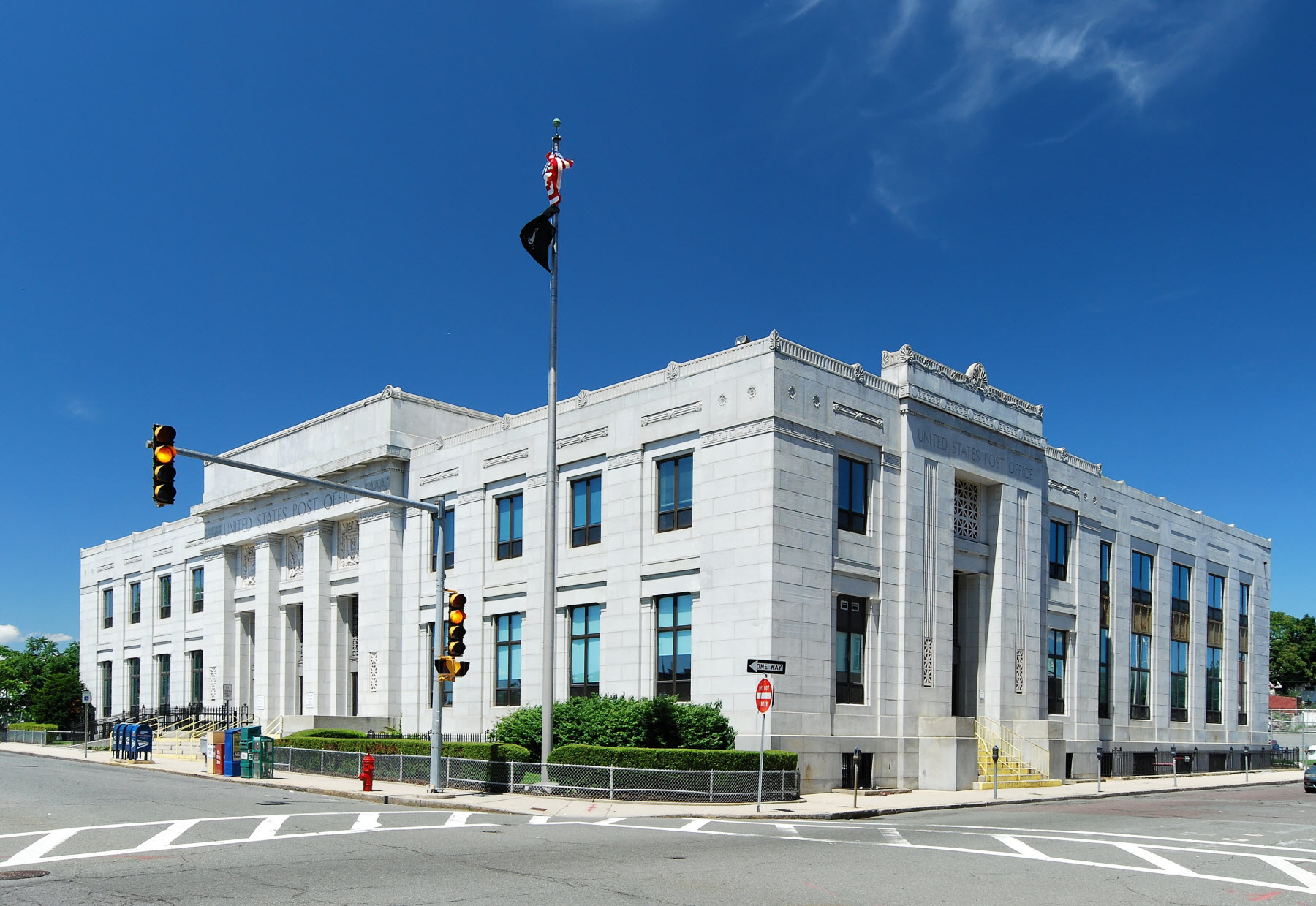
Lynn Post Office

- 1928 - An explosion at the Preble Box Toe Company factory kills 20.

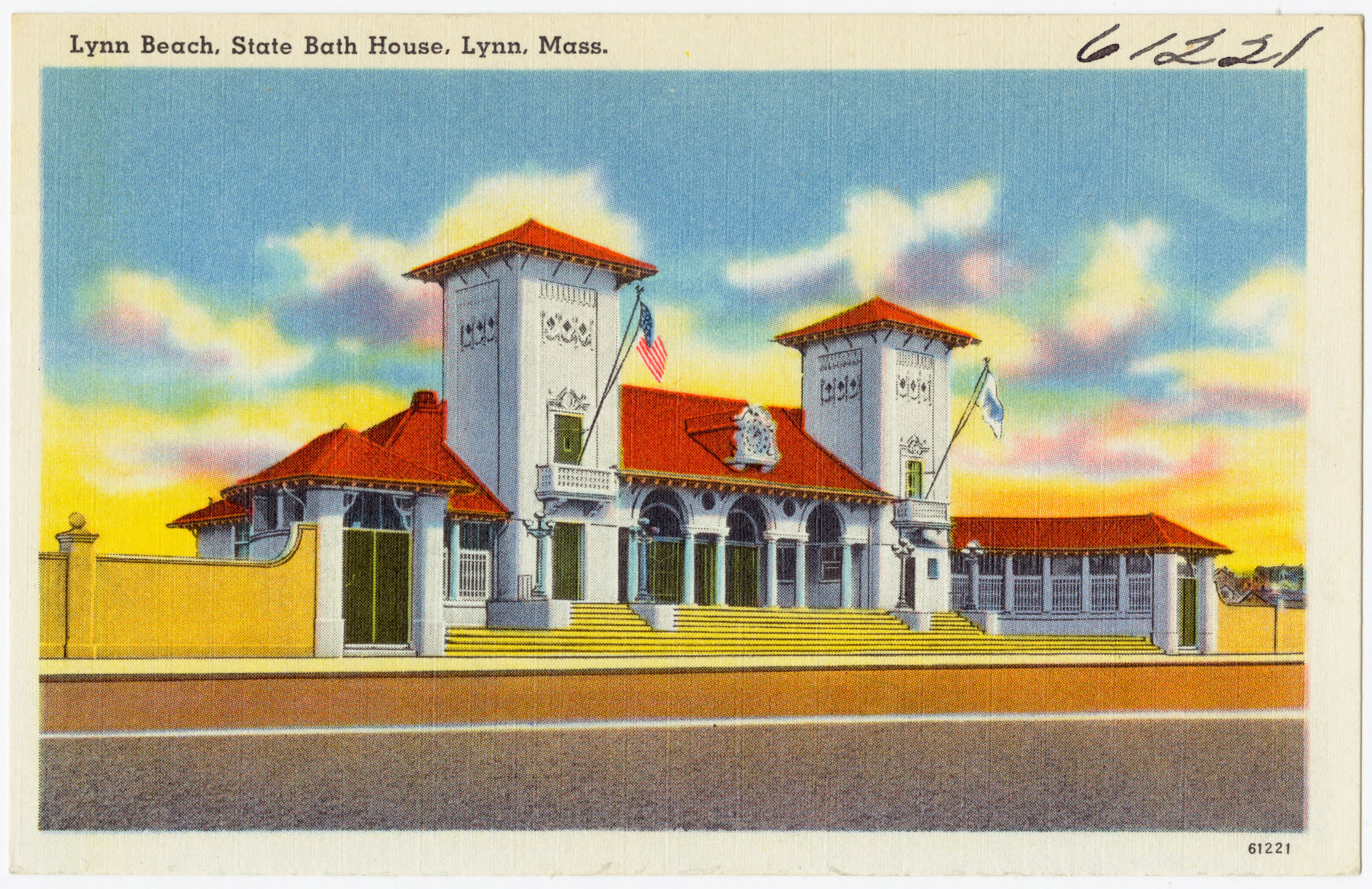
Lynn Beach, State Bath House, Lynn, Mass. a postcard from 1930

- 1930
  - Population: 102,320.
  - J. Fred Manning becomes mayor.

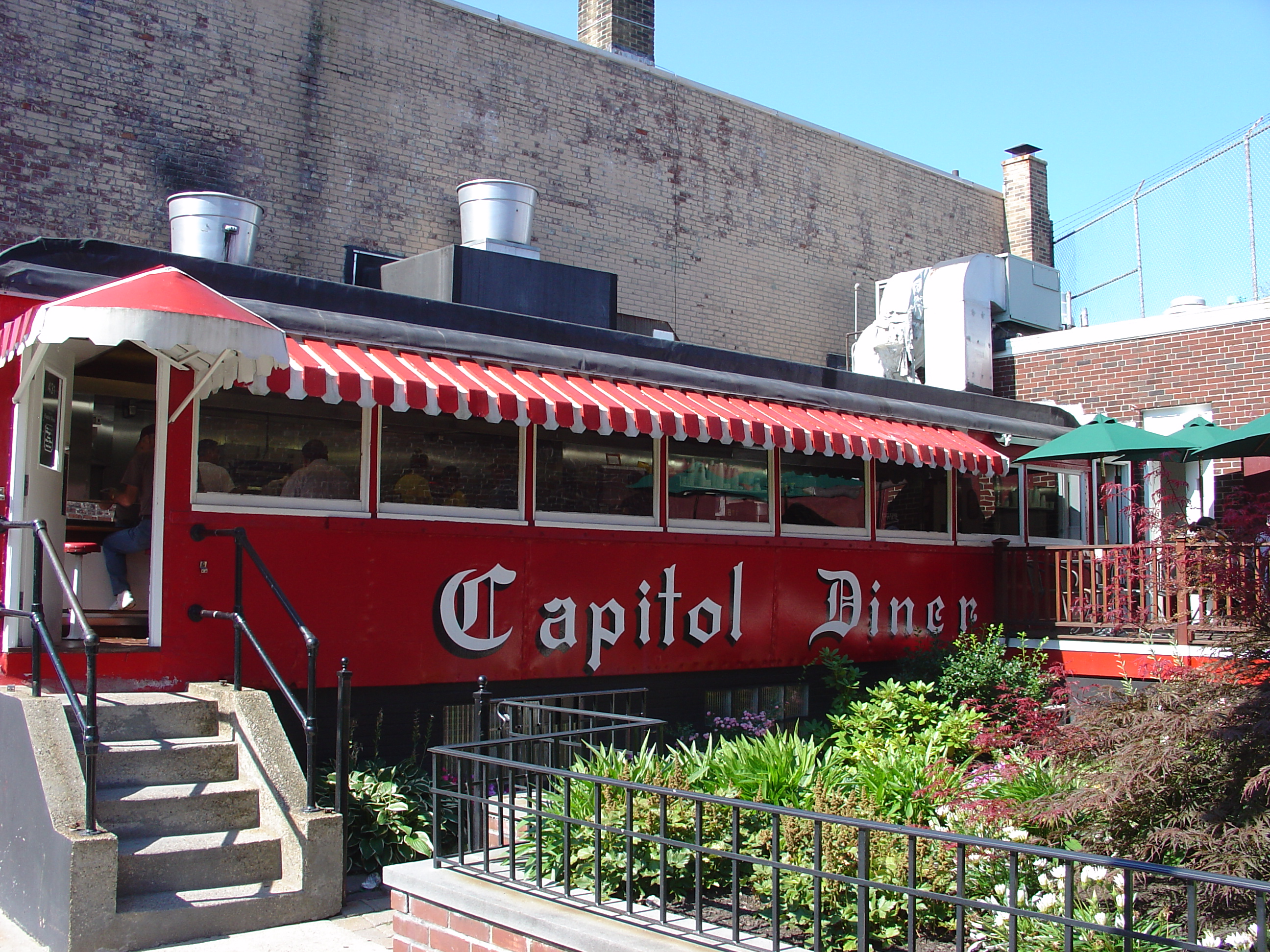
Capitol Diner

- 1933 - United States Post Office–Lynn Main built.
- 1937
  - March 28 - Highland Circuit electric streetcar line (first electric trolley in Massachusetts) is converted to motor bus operations
  - June - Congressman William P. Connery, Jr. dies.
  - September - Lawrence J. Connery elected to fill his late brother's Congressional seat.
  - November 24 - Manning Bowl stadium opens.
- 1938 - Capitol Diner in business.
- 1940
  - Albert Cole becomes mayor.
  - Fraser Field opens.
- 1943
  - River Works plant opens.
  - Mayor Albert Cole resigns to serve in U.S. Army. Arthur J. Frawley becomes acting mayor.
- 1944
  - Arthur J. Frawley elected mayor.
- 1946
  - Albert Cole becomes mayor.
  - Lynn Red Sox baseball team active.

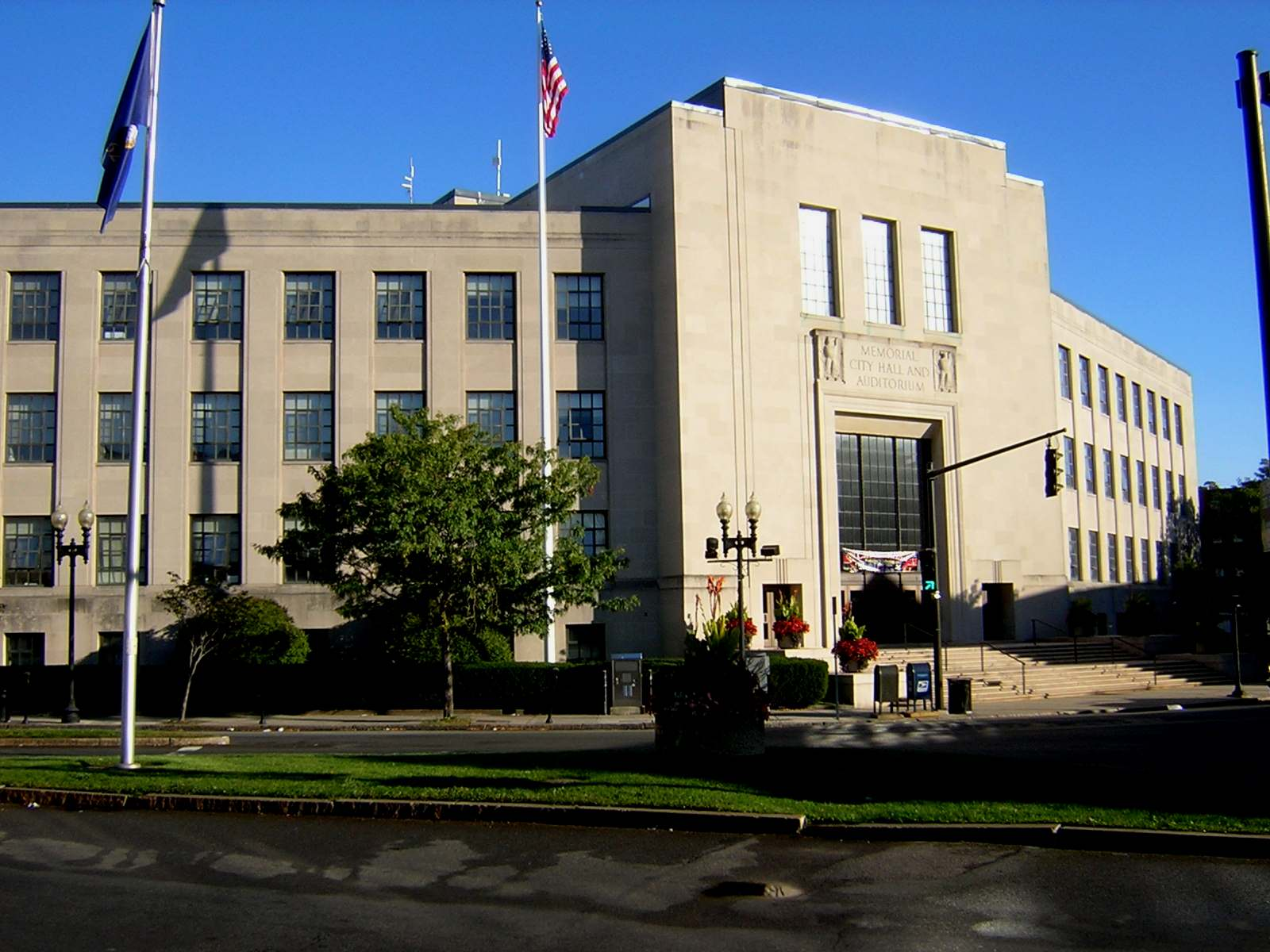
Lynn City Hall

- 1947
  - Lynn Vocational and Technical Institute established (approximate date).
  - WLYN goes on the air.
- 1949
  - City Hall built.
  - Lynn Tigers baseball team active.
- 1948 - Stuart A. Tarr becomes mayor.
- 1952
  - Arthur J. Frawley becomes mayor.
  - Boston and Maine's Central Square station rebuilt.
- 1953 - Lynn's Harry Agganis signs with the Boston Red Sox.
- 1955 - Harry Agganis dies at the age of 26.
- 1956 - Thomas P. Costin, Jr. becomes mayor.

- Musician Brian Maes is born.

- 1959 - The Chicago Bears defeat the Philadelphia Eagles 24–21 in the Cardinal Cushing Charity Game held at the Manning Bowl.
- 1960 - Lynn Sunday Post begins publication.
- 1961
  - July - Mayor Thomas P. Costin, Jr. resigns to become Postmaster of Lynn. M. Henry Wall becomes acting mayor.
  - November - M. Henry Wall elected mayor.
- 1963 - WBWL begins broadcasting.
- 1965 - North Shore Community College established
- 1966
  - Irving E. Kane becomes mayor.
  - The Rolling Stones kick off their North American Tour at the Manning Bowl.
- 1970 - J. Warren Cassidy becomes mayor.
- 1972
  - January - Pasquale Caggiano becomes mayor.
  - April - Pasquale Caggiano dies. Walter F. Meserve becomes acting mayor.
  - July - Antonio J. Marino becomes mayor.
  - Plans to construct Interstate 95 through Lynn and Lynn Woods Reservation are scrapped
- 1974 - David L. Phillips becomes mayor.
- 1975
  - Lynn's Thomas W. McGee becomes Speaker of the Massachusetts House of Representatives
  - Great Stew Chase footrace begins.
- 1976 - Antonio J. Marino becomes mayor.
- 1980 - Lynn Sailors baseball team formed.
- 1981 - November - Fire levels approximately three square blocks of the downtown, destroying 17 buildings
- 1982 - Lynn Sailors relocate to Burlington, Vermont.
- 1986 - Albert V. DiVirgilio becomes mayor.
- 1990 - The Bay State Titans, a semi-pro football team, is established. The team's Defensive Tackle, Eric Swann, would be selected with the sixth overall pick in the 1991 NFL draft.
- 1992
  - Patrick J. McManus becomes mayor.
  - Central Square - Lynn MBTA station rebuilt.
- 1999 - New Lynn Classical High School building opened.

== 21st century ==
- 2001 - City website online (approximate date).
- 2002 - Edward J. Clancy, Jr. becomes mayor.
- 2003 - North Shore Spirit baseball team begins play.

- Madeline Maes is born.

- 2004 - Regina Maes is born.
- 2005 - Manning Bowl is demolished and replaced by Manning Field.
- 2007 - North Shore Spirit cease operations.
- 2008 - North Shore Navigators baseball team relocates to Lynn.
- 2010
  - Population: 90,329.
  - Judith Flanagan Kennedy becomes Lynn's first female mayor.
- 2011 - KIPP Academy Lynn Collegiate (High School) holds its first class.
- 2012 - KIPP Academy Lynn opens doors the Highlands.
- 2014 - Seasonal ferry service to/from Boston is established

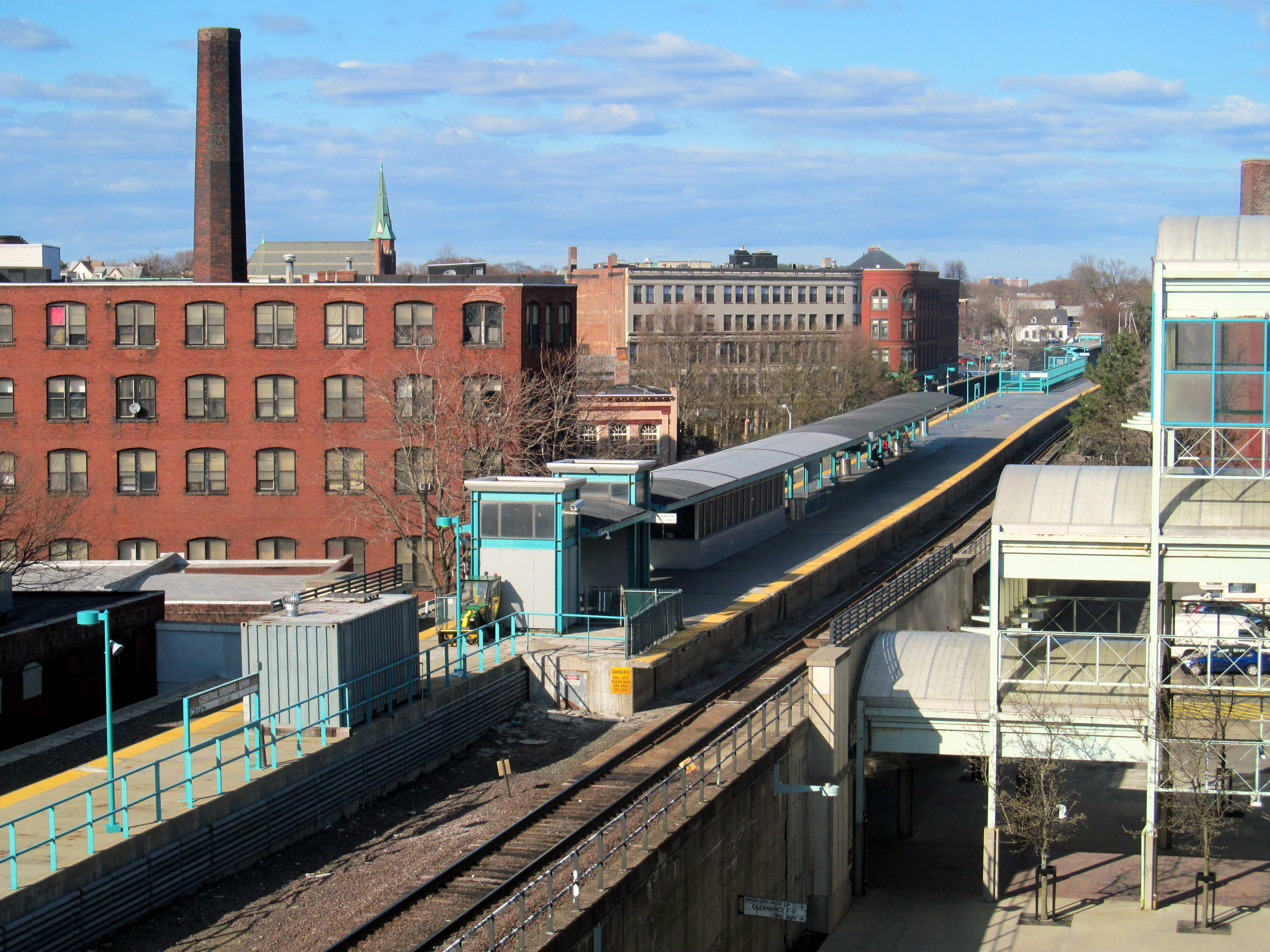
Downtown Lynn and the MBTA Lynn station 2015

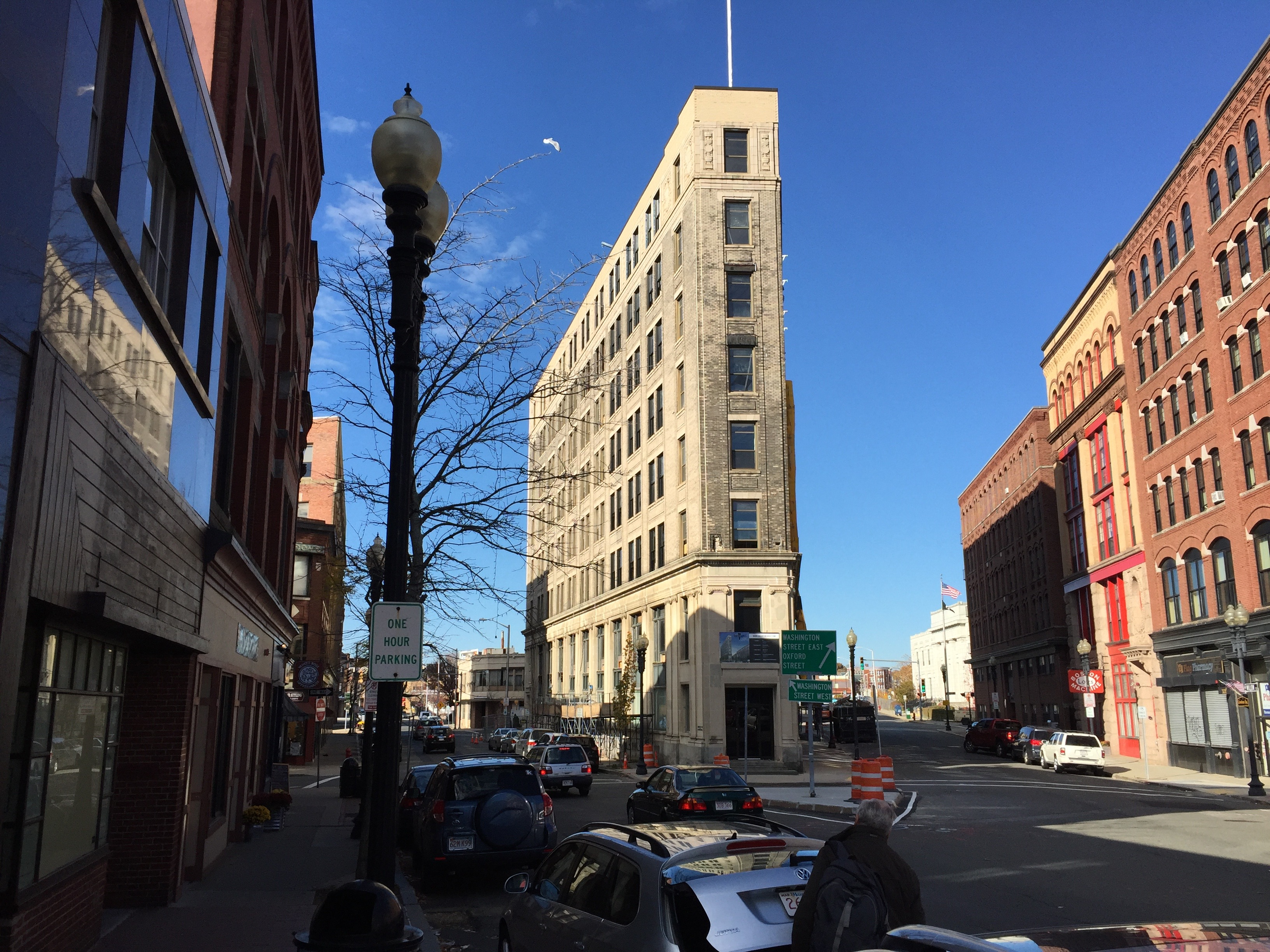
Downtown Lynn in 2016

- 2016 - Ferry service is suspended
- 2017 - Ferry service resumes
- 2018
  - 200th birthday of Frederick Douglass is celebrated throughout the year
  - Thomas M. McGee becomes mayor
  - Ferry service is suspended
- 2021
  - August 18: The Frederick Douglass Park is dedicated, directly across the street from the site of the Central Square railroad depot where Douglass was forcibly removed from the train in 1841.
- 2022
  - January 3: Jared C. Nicholson is sworn in as the 58th Mayor
  - August 23: 31-year-old Khosay Sharifi, went on a shooting spree killing, her father and brother-in-law in their home, before driving to the brother-in-law’s father’s location, shooting and killing him in his car. She then drove to a grocery store where she took her own life. A motive stemmed from learning of her brother-in-law abusing her sister, and wanting to stop the abuse from being afflicted on her sister.

== See also ==
- Lynn history
- List of mayors of Lynn, Massachusetts
- National Register of Historic Places listings in Lynn, Massachusetts
- Timelines of other municipalities in Essex County, Massachusetts: Gloucester, Haverhill, Lawrence, Newburyport, Salem
- History of Massachusetts

== Bibliography ==
Published in the 18th-19th century

- Jedidiah Morse (1797), "Lynn", American Gazetteer, Boston: At the presses of S. Hall, and Thomas & Andrews
- Alonzo Lewis (1829), The history of Lynn, Boston: J.H. Eastburn, OCLC 11545142, OL 6905784M
- Alonzo Lewis (1844), The history of Lynn, including Nahant (2nd ed.), Boston: Printed by S. N. Dickinson, OL 24930364M
- Alonzo Lewis; James R. Newhall (1865), History of Lynn, Essex County, Massachusetts: including Lynnfield, Saugus, Swampscot, and Nahant, Boston: J.L. Shorey, OL 13446280M
- Lynn Directory, 1867. Lynn, Mass.: Sampson, Davenport & Co. 1867.
- City Hall of Lynn, Lynn, Mass.: T. P. Nichols, printer, 1869, OL 14000539M
- "Chronological Table", Centennial Memorial of Lynn, Essex County, Massachusetts, Lynn: Pub. by order of the City Council, 1876
- Proceedings in Lynn, Massachusetts, June 17, 1879: being the two hundred and fiftieth anniversary of the settlement, Published by order of the City Council, 1880, OCLC 4042721, OL 6905493M
- David Newhall Johnson (1880), Sketches of Lynn: or, the changes of 50 years, Lynn, Mass.: T. P. Nichols, printer, OL 14042347M
- "City of Lynn", Industries of Massachusetts, New York: International Pub. Co., 1886, OCLC 19803267
- Lynn and Surroundings, Lynn, Mass: Lewis & Winship, 1886, OL 14021197M
- Lynn Manual and Essex County Road Book, Lynn, Mass.: E. F. Bacheller, 1888, OL 24157919M
- James R. Newhall (1890), History of Lynn, Essex County, Massachusetts, vol. 2, Lynn: G. C. Herbert, OCLC 2882816, OL 13523901M

Published in the 20th century

- "Lynn" . Encyclopædia Britannica. Vol. 17 (11th ed.). 1910. p. 172.
- Benjamin F. Arrington (1922), "City of Lynn", Municipal History of Essex County in Massachusetts, New York: Lewis Historical Publishing Company, OCLC 1619460
- Atlas of the City of Lynn, Massachusetts. L.J. Richards & Co. 1924 – via State Library of Massachusetts.
- Alan Dawley (1976), Class and Community: the industrial revolution in Lynn, Harvard Studies in Urban History, Harvard University Press, ISBN 0674133900
