= Lynn High School =

Lynn High School may refer to:

- Lynn English High School, Lynn, Massachusetts
- Lynn Classical High School, Lynn, Massachusetts
- Old Lynn High School, Lynn, Massachusetts
