= English High School =

English High School can refer to:

- English High School of Boston, Boston, Massachusetts
- English High School (1892 building), Lynn, Massachusetts
- English High School (Lynn, Massachusetts)
- English High School (Worcester, Massachusetts)
