= Mary Baker Eddy Home =

Mary Baker Eddy Home or Mary Baker Eddy House or similar may refer to:

- Dupee Estate-Mary Baker Eddy Home, Chestnut Hill, Newton, Massachusetts, listed on the National Register of Historic Places (NRHP)
- Mary Baker Eddy House (Lynn, Massachusetts), a U.S. National Historic Landmark and NRHP-listed
- Any others of numerous Mary Baker Eddy residences
