= High Rock Tower Reservation =

- High Rock Tower–High Rock Cottage and Daisy Cottage
- U.S. National Register of Historic Places
- U.S. Historic district
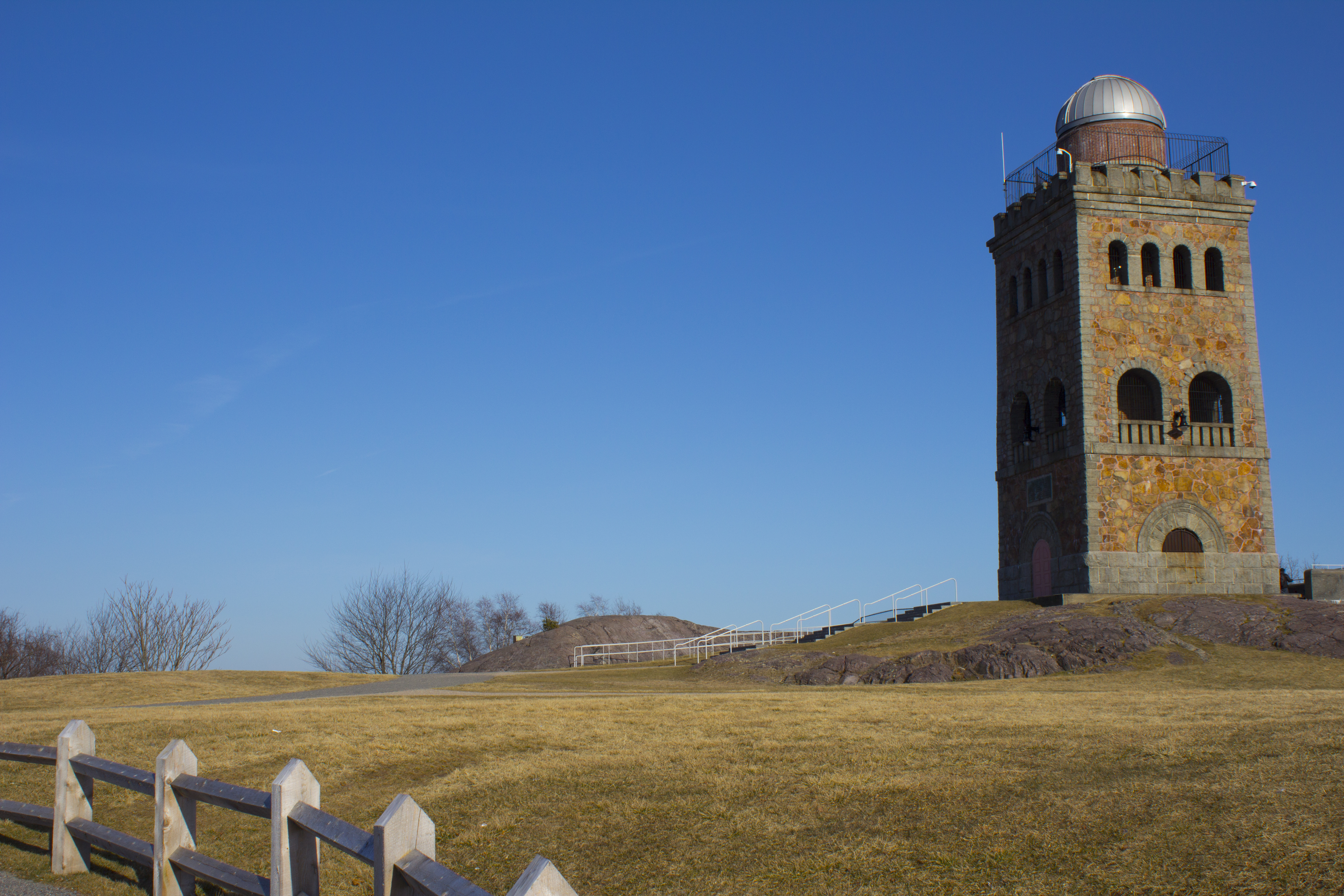
- High Rock Park and High Rock Tower

- Location within Massachusetts Location within the United States
- Location: 15, 17 Campbell Terrace, 22 Johns Avenue, and 30 Circuit Avenue, Lynn, Massachusetts
- Coordinates: 42°28′3″N 70°56′54″W
- Area: 7.16 acres (2.90 ha)
- Built: 1847
- Architect: G. E. Harney and Alonzo Lewis (High Rock Cottage); Wheeler and Betton (High Rock Tower)
- Landscape Architect: Olmsted Brothers
- Architectural style: Gothic Revival (High Rock Cottage); Romanesque Revival (High Rock Tower)
- Restored: 1998 - 2017
- Restored by: Massachusetts Historical Commission, Massachusetts Department of Environmental Management Olmsted Parks Program, and City of Lynn
- NRHP reference No.: 09000086

Significant dates
- High Rock Cottage built: 1847
- High Rock Tower built: December 16, 1905
- Olmsted Brothers design completed: 1908
- Added to NRHP: October 11, 1979

The High Rock Reservation (or High Rock Park) is a city park in the Highlands neighborhood of Lynn, Massachusetts. Designed in 1907 by the Olmsted Brothers, the roughly 7-acre (2.8 ha) park encompasses the summit area of a hill with commanding views of the surrounding area, as well as the Atlantic Ocean which is approximately half a mile away.

The park's principal attraction is the High Rock Tower, a stone structure measuring 85 feet high, completed in 1905 and dedicated on December 16. It replaces an earlier wood tower designed by Alonzo Lewis for Jesse Hutchinson of the Hutchinson Family Singers, a politically active abolitionist singing group that performed throughout the northern United States from the 1840s to about 1880. Jesse Hutchinson acquired the property from the Pawtucket natives, and by 1851 had built two Gothic Revival cottages (known as High Rock Cottage and Daisy Cottage) and later other cottages, as well as the first tower which burnt down during a celebration of the Civil War's end.

The original wooden High Rock Tower was the site of a celebration by an estimated 8,000 people on August 17, 1858 for the laying of the first Transatlantic telegraph cable completed one day previous. The Hutchinsons held nightly rallies and concerts there during the first year of the Civil War.

The park was listed on the National Register of Historic Places (as "High Rock Tower–High Rock Cottage and Daisy Cottage") in 1979. The lands surrounding the tower were protected by The Trust for Public Land and conveyed to the City of Lynn in 1988.

High Rock Tower is featured prominently on the Lynn city seal. It is one of five structures in Lynn designed by Holman K. Wheeler which are listed on the National Register of Historic Places.

In 1998, a grant from the Massachusetts Historical Commission allowed for restoration of the Tower. A new observatory was added, replacing the prior observatory which was removed after being vandalized. Later additional park renovation projects between 2012 and 2016 have included new stone-chip pathways, expansion of the reservation base at Essex Street with traffic mitigation, and new granite stairways leading from Essex Street to the base of the Tower. Finally, in 2017 the stone High Rock Cottage received stabilization work including a new roof.

The City of Lynn has periodically opened the tower and observatory to the public for free use of the telescope. This practice continues in summer 2018, with scheduled evenings in July and August.

In 2017, the community organization Centerboard raised $45,000 for the installation of LED lighting and a laser projector for two of the four sides of High Rock Tower. Additional grant funding was obtained in 2018, for LED and laser illumination of the remaining two sides of the tower.

Historical postcard of setting

== See also ==
- Lynn, Massachusetts
- Timeline of Lynn, Massachusetts
- National Register of Historic Places listings in Lynn, Massachusetts
