= National Register of Historic Places listings in Lynn, Massachusetts =

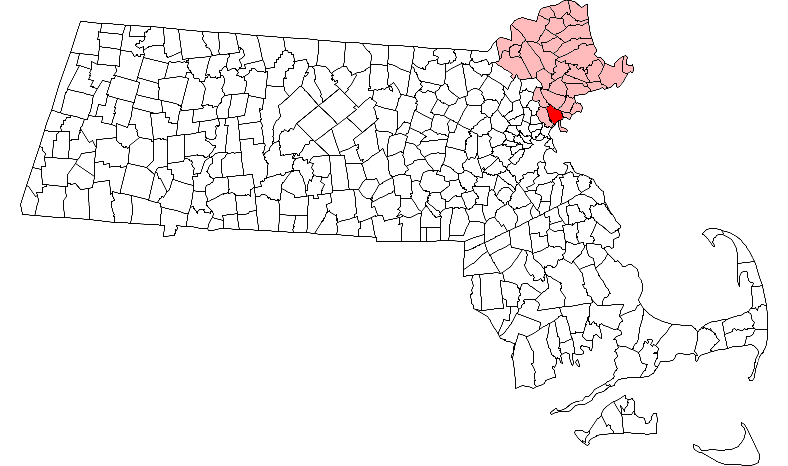
Location of Lynn in Massachusetts

This is a list of the National Register of Historic Places listings in Lynn, Massachusetts.

This is intended to be a complete list of the properties and districts on the National Register of Historic Places in Lynn, Massachusetts, United States. The locations of National Register properties and districts for which the latitude and longitude coordinates are included below, may be viewed in an online map.

Essex County, of which Lynn is a part, is the location of more than 450 properties and districts listed on the National Register. Lynn itself is the location of 31 of these properties and districts, of which two are National Historic Landmarks.

This National Park Service list is complete through NPS recent listings posted July 17, 2026.

== Current listings ==
	Name on the Register	Image	Date listed	Location	Description
1	Capitol Diner	Capitol Diner	September 22, 1999 (#99001121)	431 Union St. 42°27′48″N 70°56′40″W	part of the Diners of Massachusetts Multiple Property Submission (MPS)
2	Central Square Historic District	Central Square Historic District	December 10, 1985 (#85003335)	Central Sq., Munroe, Union, and Willow Sts. 42°27′50″N 70°56′44″W	
3	Diamond Historic District	Diamond Historic District	October 10, 1996 (#96001040)	Roughly bounded by Broad, Lewis, Ocean Sts., Swampscott Line, Lynn Shore Dr., and Wave and Nahant Sts. 42°27′38″N 70°55′58″W	
4	Mary Baker Eddy House	Mary Baker Eddy House	January 13, 2021 (#100006275)	8 Broad Street; 42°27′50″N 70°56′06″W	
5	English High School	English High School	September 11, 1986 (#86002508)	498 Essex St. 42°27′59″N 70°56′50″W	Listing is for the 1890s former building, not the current facilities. One of five registered structures in Lynn designed by Holman K. Wheeler.
6	Fabens Building	Fabens Building	February 25, 1982 (#82001879)	312-314 Union St. 42°27′53″N 70°56′38″W	One of four registered buildings in Lynn designed by Henry Warren Rogers
7	G.A.R. Hall and Museum	G.A.R. Hall and Museum	May 7, 1979 (#79000331)	58 Andrew St. 42°27′46″N 70°56′53″W	One of five registered structures in Lynn designed by Holman K. Wheeler
8	High Rock Tower-High Rock Cottage and Daisy Cottage	High Rock Tower-High Rock Cottage and Daisy Cottage	October 11, 1979 (#09000086)	15, 17 Campbell Terr. and High Rock Park; 42°28′06″N 70°56′49″W	One of five registered structures in Lynn designed by Holman K. Wheeler
9	Charles Lovejoy House	Charles Lovejoy House	November 28, 1978 (#78000454)	64 Broad St. 42°27′48″N 70°56′19″W	
10	Lynn Armory	Lynn Armory	September 7, 1979 (#79000332)	36 S. Common St. 42°27′47″N 70°57′16″W	One of five registered structures in Lynn designed by Holman K. Wheeler
11	Lynn Bank Block	Lynn Bank Block	August 26, 1982 (#82004964)	21-29 Exchange St. 42°27′49″N 70°56′36″W	
12	Lynn Common Historic District	Lynn Common Historic District	April 10, 1992 (#92000247)	Roughly N. and S. Common St. from Market Sq. to City Hall; 42°27′49″N 70°57′28″W	
13	Lynn Item Building	Lynn Item Building	August 18, 2023 (#100009282)	38-54 Exchange St. 42°27′49″N 70°56′34″W	One of four registered buildings in Lynn designed by Henry Warren Rogers
14	Lynn Masonic Hall	Lynn Masonic Hall	August 21, 1979 (#79000333)	64-68 Market St. 42°27′48″N 70°56′59″W	
15	Lynn Memorial City Hall and Auditorium	Lynn Memorial City Hall and Auditorium	February 24, 2005 (#05000082)	3 City Hall Square; 42°27′53″N 70°57′06″W	
16	Lynn Public Library	Lynn Public Library	August 21, 1979 (#79000334)	5 N. Common St. 42°27′52″N 70°57′15″W	
17	Lynn Realty Company Building No. 2	Lynn Realty Company Building No. 2	March 31, 1983 (#83000579)	672-680 Washington St. 42°27′43″N 70°56′41″W	One of four registered buildings in Lynn designed by Henry Warren Rogers
18	Lynn Woods Historic District	Lynn Woods Historic District	September 6, 1996 (#96000951)	Roughly bounded by Lynnfield St., Bow Ridge, Great Woods Rd., Parkland Ave., Walnut St., Saugus Line; 42°29′21″N 70°59′13″W	
19	Mowers' Block	Mowers' Block	February 25, 1982 (#82001991)	7 Willow St. and 67-83 Blake St. 42°27′51″N 70°56′44″W	
20	Munroe Street Historic District	Munroe Street Historic District	December 2, 1996 (#96000952)	Bounded by Market, Oxford, and Washington Sts., and the MBTA commuter rail line 42°27′46″N 70°56′53″W	
21	Nahant Beach Boulevard-Metropolitan Park System of Greater Boston	Nahant Beach Boulevard-Metropolitan Park System of Greater Boston	August 11, 2003 (#03000747)	Nahant Beach Boulevard; 42°26′12″N 70°56′17″W	Extends for most of its length into Nahant. Part of the Metropolitan Park System of Greater Boston MPS.
22	Lucian Newhall House	Lucian Newhall House	July 18, 1985 (#85001576)	281 Ocean St. 42°27′39″N 70°56′12″W	
23	Old Lynn High School	Old Lynn High School	March 6, 2002 (#02000130)	50 High St. 42°27′58″N 70°56′45″W	
24	Old Post Office Building	Old Post Office Building	September 14, 1981 (#81000118)	360 Washington St. 42°27′53″N 70°56′54″W	
25	The Osmund and the Liberty Building Historic District		July 24, 2026 (#100013246)	103 and 87-93 Liberty Street; 42°27′54″N 70°56′53″W	
26	Pine Grove Cemetery	Pine Grove Cemetery	June 27, 2014 (#14000364)	145 Boston St. 42°28′39″N 70°57′44″W	
27	Lydia Pinkham House	Lydia Pinkham House	September 25, 2012 (#12000818)	285 Western Ave. 42°28′33″N 70°57′03″W	Pinkham's home was the mailing address for orders of her homemade herbal remedy for menstrual cramps, one of the most popular such medications of the late 19th century, as a result of her then-innovative use of her image as a marketing tool.
28	St. Stephen's Memorial Church	St. Stephen's Memorial Church	September 7, 1979 (#79000335)	74 S. Common St. 42°27′46″N 70°57′24″W	
29	Tapley Building	Tapley Building	March 31, 1983 (#83000586)	206 Broad St. 42°27′45″N 70°56′41″W	Destroyed by fire in 1999. One of five registered structures in Lynn designed by Holman K. Wheeler.
30	US Post Office--Lynn Main	US Post Office--Lynn Main	June 20, 1986 (#86001342)	51 Willow St. 42°27′54″N 70°56′48″W	Renamed in 2018 as the Thomas P. Costin Jr. Post Office Building.
31	Vamp Building	Vamp Building	March 31, 1983 (#83000587)	3-15 Liberty Square; 42°27′45″N 70°56′50″W	One of four registered buildings in Lynn designed by Henry Warren Rogers. Original name "Lynn Realty Company Building #4".

== Former listings ==
	Name on the Register	Image	Date listed	Date removed	Location	Description
1	Broad Street Historic District		December 2, 1980 (#83004372)	April 16, 1983	Marshall's Wharf	Seventeen buildings destroyed by fire on November 28, 1981.

== See also ==
- List of National Historic Landmarks in Massachusetts
- National Register of Historic Places listings in Massachusetts
- National Register of Historic Places listings in Essex County, Massachusetts
