= Lynn Item Building =

- U.S. National Register of Historic Places
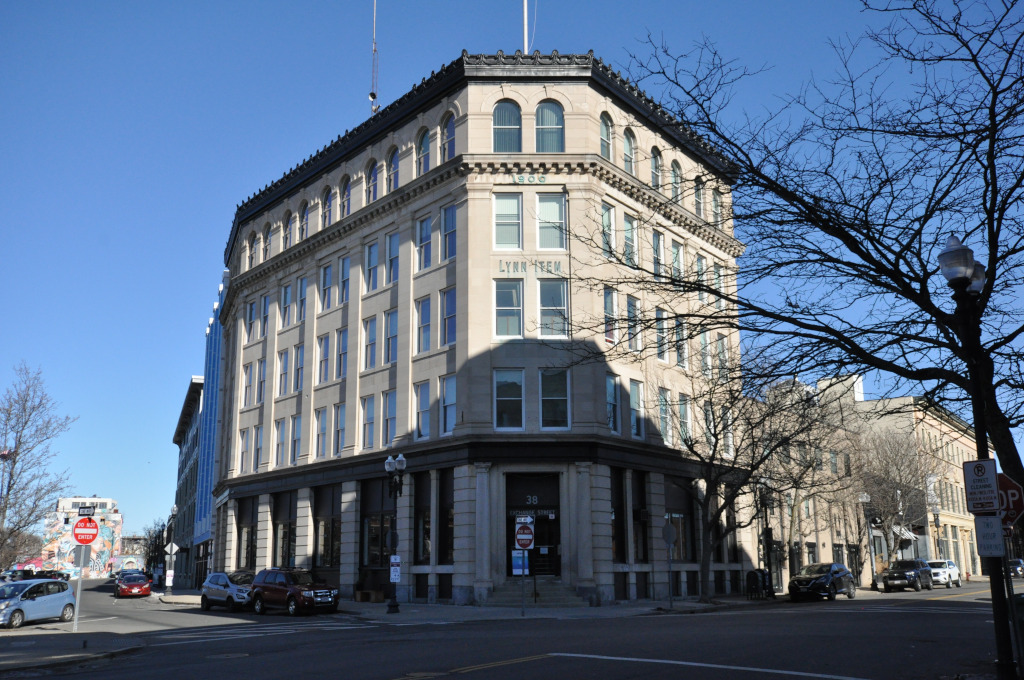

- Location within Massachusetts Location within the United States
- Location: 38-54 Exchange Street, Lynn, Massachusetts
- Coordinates: 42°27′43″N 70°56′41″W
- Area: 0.36 acres (0.15 ha)
- Built: 1900
- Architect: Henry Warren Rogers
- Architectural style: Italian Renaissance
- NRHP reference No.: 100009282
- Added to NRHP: August 18, 2023

The Lynn Item Building is a historic commercial building at 38-54 Exchange Street in downtown Lynn, Massachusetts. It was built in 1900-1901 to a design by local architect Henry Warren Rogers. It was home to The Daily Item, the city's leading newspaper, until 2014, and is the city's only surviving 19th-century purpose-built newspaper building. It was listed on the National Register of Historic Places in 2023. It was converted to mixed commercial and residential use in 2021.

== Description and history ==
The Lynn Item Building is located on the east side of downtown Lynn, at the northeast corner of Exchange and Mount Vernon Streets. It is a five-story masonry structure, its exterior finished in limestone with Italian Renaissance styling. A two-story addition, built in 1971, extends along Exchange Street; it is a Modernist structure built of concrete faced in buff brick. The addition now houses the building's main entrance, following the conversion of its upper floors to residential use.

The Daily Item was founded in Lynn in 1876 by Horace Hastings, and remained in that family's ownership until 2014, when it was sold to local media group. It occupied a variety of buildings in downtown Lynn (of which none survive), and built its first dedicated facility in 1891 following a major fire in the city. Due to its growth, the present building was constructed just ten years later to a design by local architect Henry Warren Rogers, and is one of the city's few commercial buildings with a limestone exterior. The addition was constructed in 1971 to a design by Abraham Woolf.

== See also ==
- National Register of Historic Places listings in Lynn, Massachusetts
- National Register of Historic Places listings in Essex County, Massachusetts
