= Munroe Street Historic District =

Historic district in Massachusetts, United States

- U.S. National Register of Historic Places
- U.S. Historic district
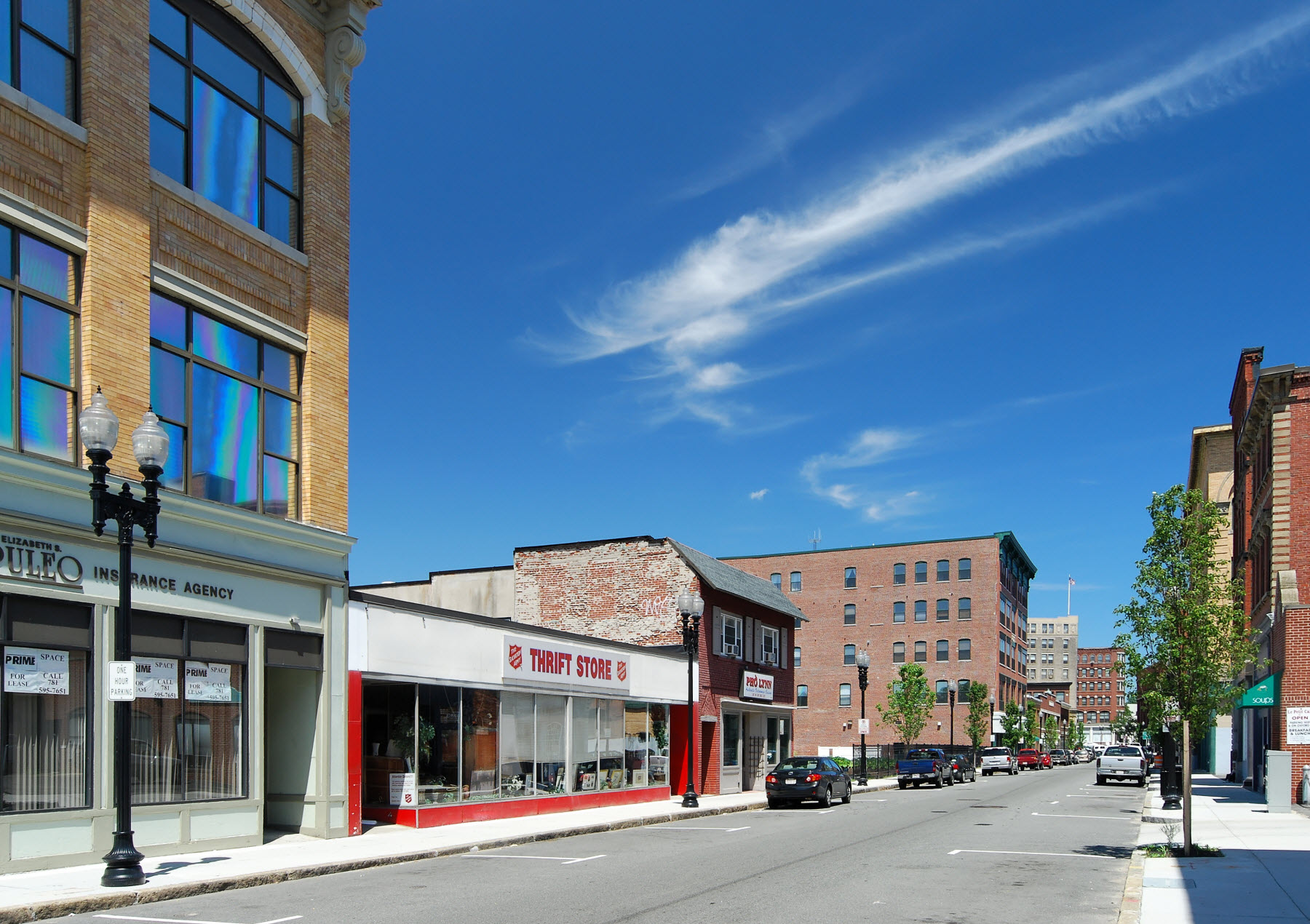

- Location within Massachusetts Location within the United States
- Location: Munroe St. between Market and Washington Sts., Lynn, Massachusetts
- Coordinates: 42°27′46″N 70°56′53″W
- Area: 2.2 acres (0.89 ha)
- Built: 1889
- Architect: Ashton, James; Huntress, J.S., et al.
- Architectural style: Italianate, Tudor Revival, Beaux Arts
- NRHP reference No.: 96000952
- Added to NRHP: December 2, 1996

The Munroe Street Historic District encompasses some of the few commercial buildings to survive in downtown Lynn, Massachusetts from the mid 19th century. The district includes properties on Munroe Street between Market and Washington Streets, which was spared by the 1889 fire that destroyed much of Lynn's downtown area. It was listed on the National Register of Historic Places in 1996.

== Description and history ==
Munroe Street is located in downtown Lynn, just west of its Central Square area. It parallels the railroad tracks of the MBTA commuter rail, whose station is located on the opposite side of the tracks to the south. Munroe Street is one block long, extending from Market Street in the west to Washington Street in the east. There are 23 buildings lining the street, which are all of an industrial or commercial character. Most are between two and four stories in height, and of brick construction. Most were built between about 1870 and 1890, although instances of older and newer construction also appear. The buildings are stylistically diverse, and are typically in vernacular styles popular at the time of construction.

The city of Lynn was first settled in 1629, with significant development not occurring on what is now Munroe Street until the 19th century. The railroad line that Munroe parallels was laid out in 1840, and Market Street was from an earlier date a crossing point for a nearby stream. Munroe Street became an early nexus for Lynn's nascent shoe industry after the railroad arrived, gradually expanding businesses developing their due to the convenient rail access. Although there were at the time some residences on the street, by the late 19th century they had all been replaced by shoe factories. The area is notable for surviving the city's Great Fire of 1889, which raged to the east and destroyed significant portions of the downtown area. As a result, the street's architecture provides one of the best windows into the early history of its historically significant shoe industry.

== See also ==
- National Register of Historic Places listings in Lynn, Massachusetts
- National Register of Historic Places listings in Essex County, Massachusetts
