= Holman K. Wheeler =

Architect of historic structures in Essex County

Holman King Wheeler
- Born: October 26, 1859; Berlin, Massachusetts, US
- Died: December 1943 (aged 84); Newton, Massachusetts, US
- Education: Massachusetts Institute of Technology
- Occupation: Architect
- Practice: Wheeler & Northend; H. K. Wheeler (independent practice); Wheeler & Betton; Wheeler & Johnson
- Buildings: High Rock Tower; Lynn G. A. R. Hall; Lynn High School (1892 building); Tapley Building; Lynn Armory

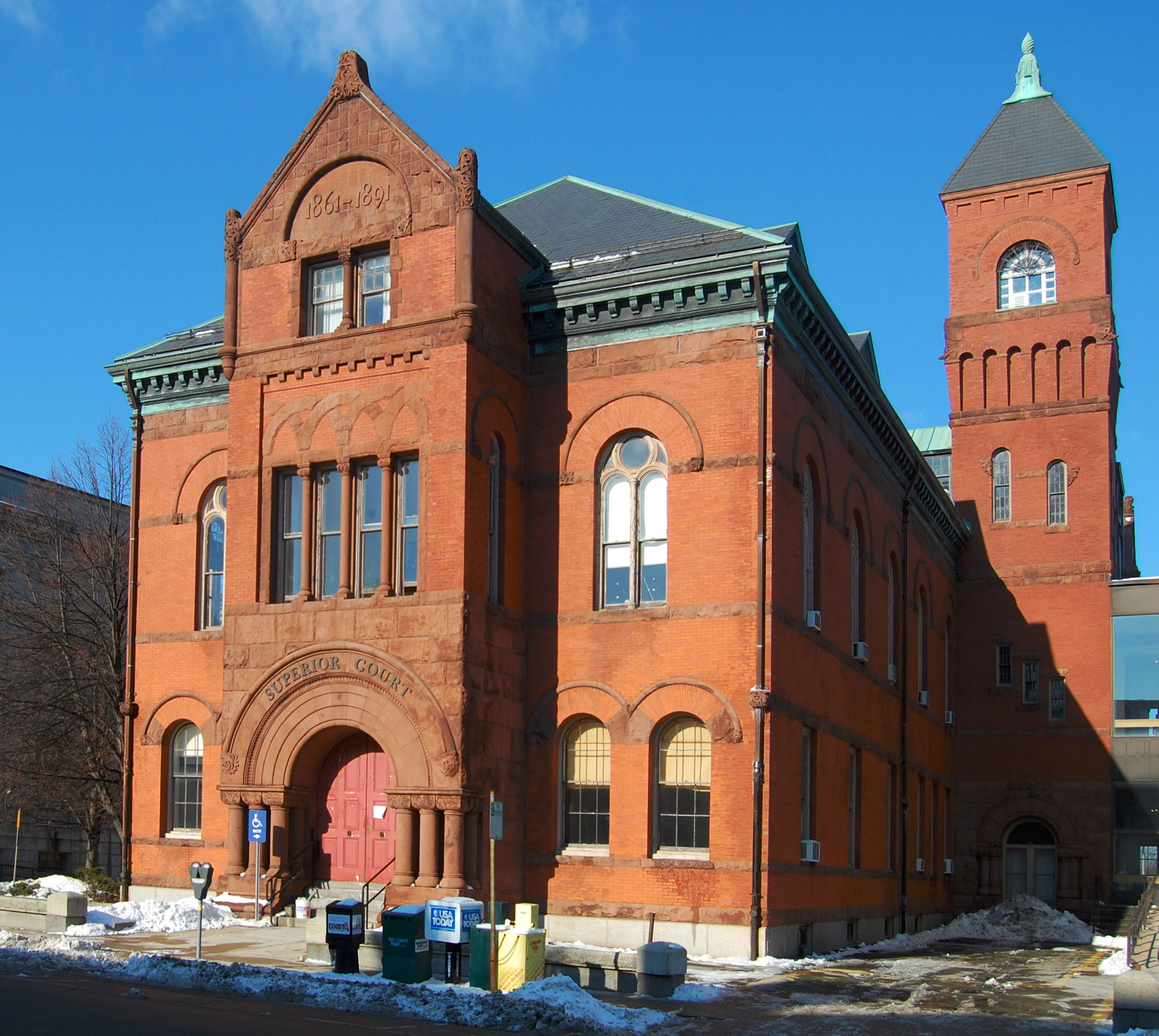
County Courthouse, Salem, 1891.

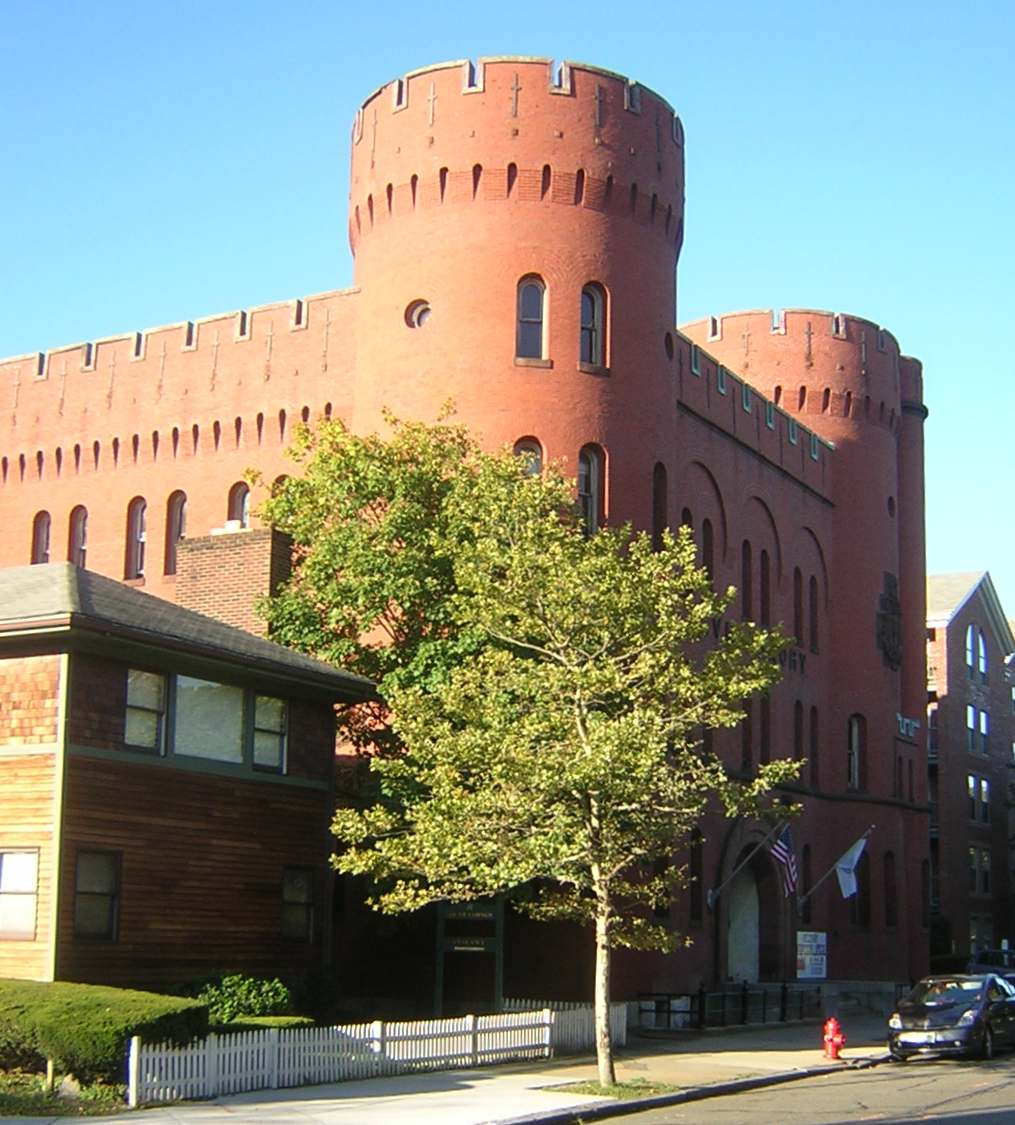
Lynn Armory, Lynn, 1893.

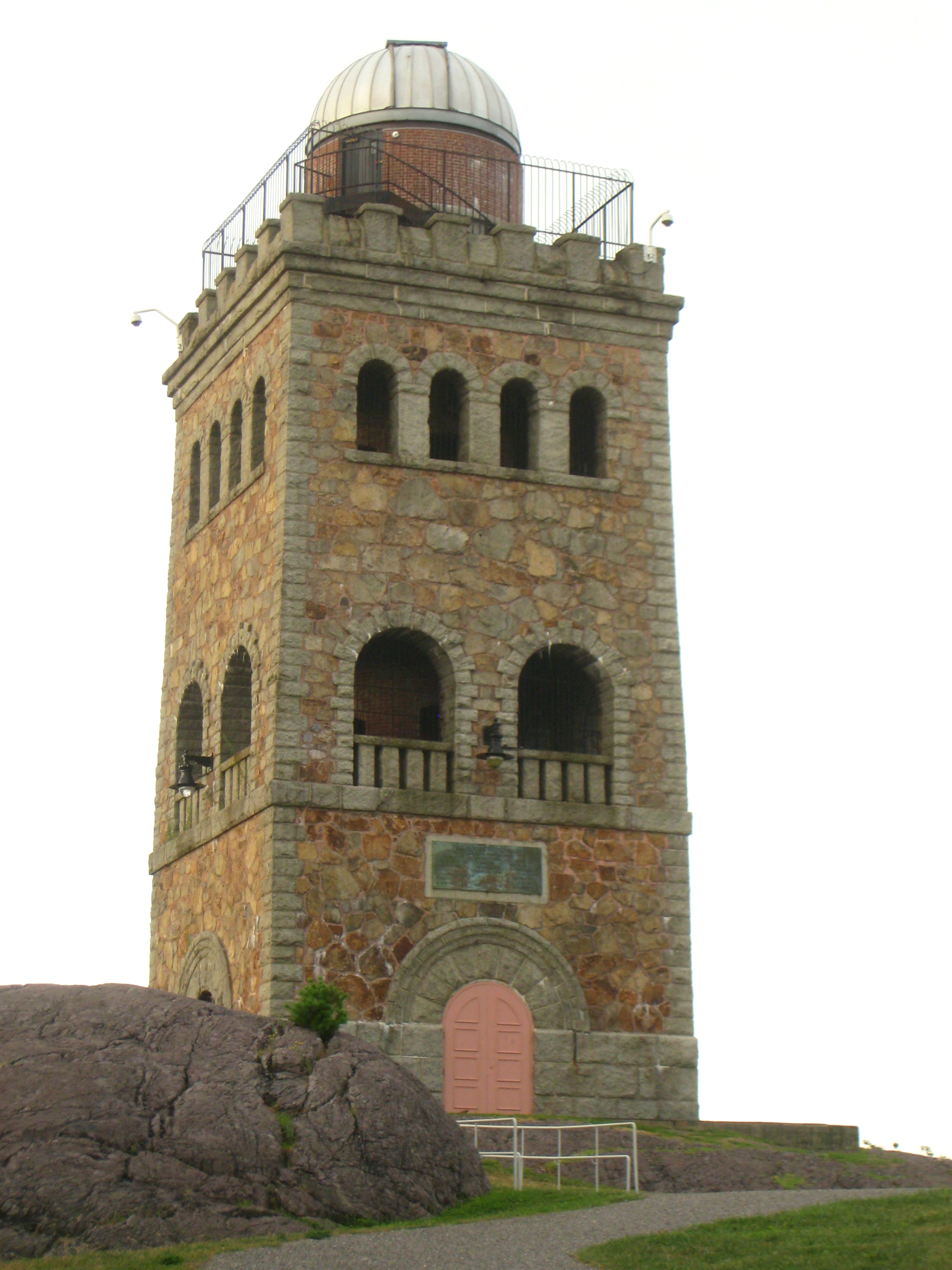
High Rock Tower, Lynn, 1904.

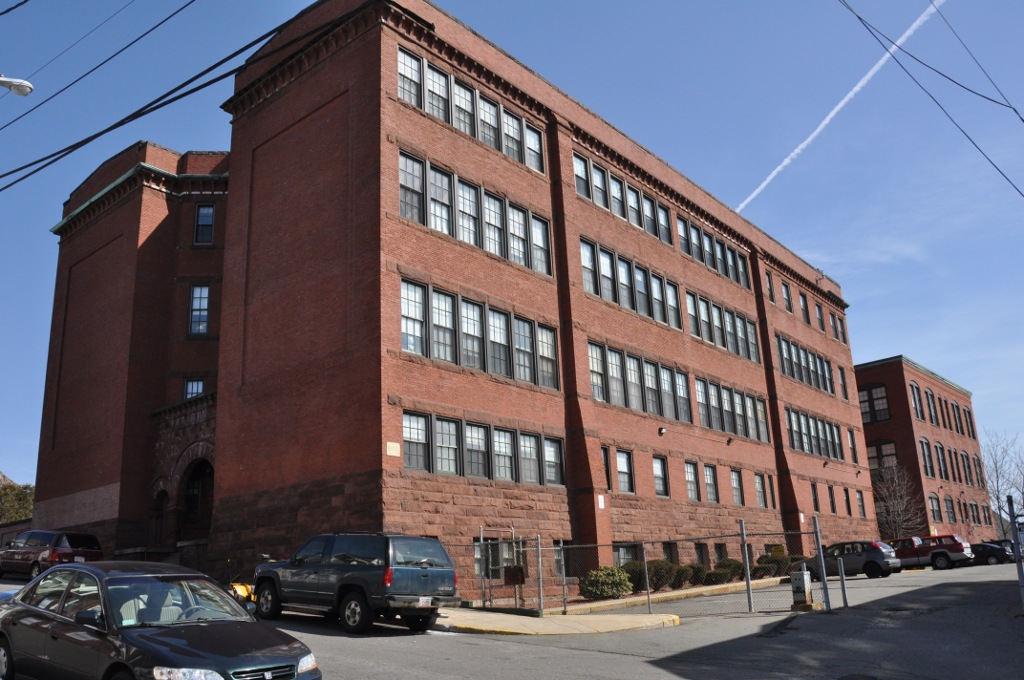
English High School, Lynn, 1915 addition.

Holman K. Wheeler was a prolific Massachusetts architect. Wheeler (working alone or with partners) is responsible for designing more than 400 structures in the city of Lynn alone, including the iconic High Rock Tower which is featured prominently on the Lynn city seal. While practicing in Lynn and Boston over a career spanning at least 35 years Wheeler designed structures throughout the Essex County area, including Haverhill, Marblehead, Newburyport, Salem, Swampscott, and Lynn. Wheeler is responsible for a total of five Lynn structures listed on the National Register of Historic Places, more than any other person or firm.

== Life ==
Holman King Wheeler was born October 26, 1859, in Berlin, Massachusetts. He attended the Massachusetts Institute of Technology, then located in Boston. He graduated in 1882. He had worked in the offices of Lynn architects beginning in 1878, and began working on his own by 1883. In 1884 he formed the firm of Wheeler & Northend in Lynn, with Salem architect W. Wheelwright Northend. Northend resumed his independent practice around 1893, and Wheeler continued alone. In 1904 he established a partnership with Charles L. Betton, Wheeler & Betton. Betton had left by 1914, and Wheeler established Wheeler & Johnson with Leonard P. Johnson. By 1919, Wheeler had left the Lynn area, heading south to Boston. He did at least one project from his office in that city, but had retired to his and his wife's home in Newton by 1920.

== Partners ==
=== Northend ===
William Wheelwright Northend was born in 1857 in Salem to later Massachusetts State Senator William Dummer Northend. He was the younger brother to Mary Harrod Northend. Originally intending to practice law, he graduated from Bowdoin College in 1880. Turning to architecture, he worked for Hartwell & Richardson and Cobb & Frost. He then attended M. I. T. for a year before studying in Paris. Prior to establishing a firm with Wheeler, he had opened an office in Salem. After the firm's dissolution, he practiced alone for a year before his death in 1894. He was the architect of Swampscott's Phillips High School, opened in 1894 and demolished c.2018. (Sources disagree on whether Northend or Wheeler was the architect.)

=== Betton ===
Charles Louis Betton was born in 1870, and died in 1934 in Lynn. After leaving Wheeler, Betton established his own office. He designed the Pickering School in 1916 on Conomo Ave, Lynn. He also did extensive industrial work.

=== Johnson ===
Leonard P. Johnson was a consulting architect for Willett, Sears and Company until January 1, 1914, when he took over the office of George A. Cornet in Lynn after Cornet was elected the city's commissioner of public property. By 1923, he was an architect and construction engineer for the American Woolen Company and had moved to the company's Shawsheen Village. He was also an architect for Coolidge Shepley Bulfinch and Abbott and did residential work in Andover, Massachusetts. He died on March 8, 1967, at the Masonic Home in Charlton, Massachusetts, at the age of 89.

== Architectural works ==
=== Wheeler & Northend, 1884-1893 ===
- 1885 - G. A. R. Hall, 58 Andrew St, Lynn, Massachusetts
  - Listed on National Register of Historic Places
  - General Frederick W. Lander (for whom the Lynn G.A.R. Post is named) while attending Governor Dummer Academy began a longtime friendship with William Dummer Northend, father of William Wheelwright Northend
- 1885 - Grader Block, 3 Pleasant St, Marblehead, Massachusetts
- 1886 - John A. Greenwood House, 158 South Common St, Lynn, Massachusetts
- 1887 - Sylvanus P. Gardner House, 1 Windsor St, Haverhill, Massachusetts
- 1888 - Central Police Station, 18 Sutton St, Lynn, Massachusetts
  - Demolished.
- 1889 - Lynn Police Department Stables, 28-30 Sutton St, Lynn, Massachusetts
  - Demolished.
- 1889 - Lynn High School (1892 building), 498 Essex St, Lynn, Massachusetts
  - Listed on National Register of Historic Places
  - Original building section destroyed by fire on March 29, 1924
  - Later the English High School. Now residential units.
- 1890 - Myra S. Rowell House, 94 Elmwood Rd, Swampscott, Massachusetts
- 1890 - Tapley Building, 206 Broad St, Lynn, Massachusetts
  - Listed on National Register of Historic Places
  - Burned in 1999.
- 1890 - Heffernan Block, 1-5 Exchange St & 402-404 Union St, Lynn, Massachusetts
  - Demolished c. 1910 as part of the Lynn Central Square railroad grade separation
- 1890 - John S. Earl Building, 9-13 Exchange St & 406-408 Union St, Lynn, Massachusetts
  - Also referred to as "Earl's Block"
  - Demolished c. 1910 as part of the Lynn Central Square railroad grade separation
- 1891 - Oxford Club, 106 Broad St, Lynn, Massachusetts
  - Wheeler was a member. The building has been highly altered.
- 1891 - Essex County Courthouse (Remodeling), 34 Federal St, Salem, Massachusetts
- c.1891 - Lucien [sic] Newhall Block, 25-35 Central Ave and 30-33 Willow St, Lynn, Massachusetts ("Lucien" is a mis-spelling of "Lucian")
  - Demolished. Former location is now the parking lot at the rear of the "flatiron" building, diagonally opposite the Thomas P. Costin Jr. Post Office Building
- 1893 - Lynn Armory, 36 South Common St, Lynn, Massachusetts
  - Listed on National Register of Historic Places

=== Holman K. Wheeler, 1893-1904 ===
- 1894 - The Phillips School, Greenwood Avenue, Swampscott, Massachusetts
  - Sources disagree on whether Northend or Wheeler was the architect.
  - First High School in Swampscott
  - Demolished c.2018
- 1895 - Naumkeag Building, 203 Essex St, Salem, Massachusetts
- 1895 - Hugh E. Murphy Building, Washington St near Monroe St
- 1895 - Proctor Building, 31 Exchange St, Lynn, Massachusetts
- 1895 - Edward Heffernan Block, 516-520 Washington Street, Lynn, Massachusetts
  - Demolished September 2021
- 1897 - Henry B. Falls Apartments, 110-120 Broad St, Lynn, Massachusetts
- 1900 - Bacheller School, 35 Lynnfield St, Lynn, Massachusetts
- 1900 - Jackman School, School St, Newburyport, Massachusetts
  - Demolished.
- 1901 - Lynn Business College, 112 Exchange St, Lynn, Massachusetts
- 1902 - Eugene A. Putnam Apartments, 95 Union St, Lynn, Massachusetts

=== Wheeler & Betton, 1904-1914 ===
- 1904 - High Rock Tower, High Rock Tower Reservation, Lynn, Massachusetts
  - Listed on National Register of Historic Places
- 1904 - Lennox Building, 184-186 Market St, Lynn, Massachusetts
  - Demolished.
- 1904 - Littlefield Building, 604 Essex St, Lynn, Massachusetts
- 1909 - Goddard Bros. Store, 76 Market St, Lynn, Massachusetts (currently occupied by Zimman's fabrics store)
- 1911 - Brewster Apartments, 26 Broad St, Lynn, Massachusetts
- 1912 - Arthur Wellington Pinkham (grandson of Lydia Pinkham) House, 311 Western Ave, Lynn, Massachusetts
  - Now the Lucia Lighting Company

=== Wheeler & Johnson, 1914-c.1918 ===
- 1915 - English High School (Addition), 498 Essex St, Lynn, Massachusetts
  - The James Street wing.
- 1915 - Littlefield Building, 604 Essex St, Lynn, Massachusetts (addition)
- 1917 - A. J. Mulholland Tannery, 14 Proctor St, Salem, Massachusetts

=== Holman K. Wheeler, c.1918-1919 ===
- 1919 - Dry Storage Building, Chestnut Street, Amesbury, Massachusetts, for Biddle & Smart Co.

== Architectural drawings ==
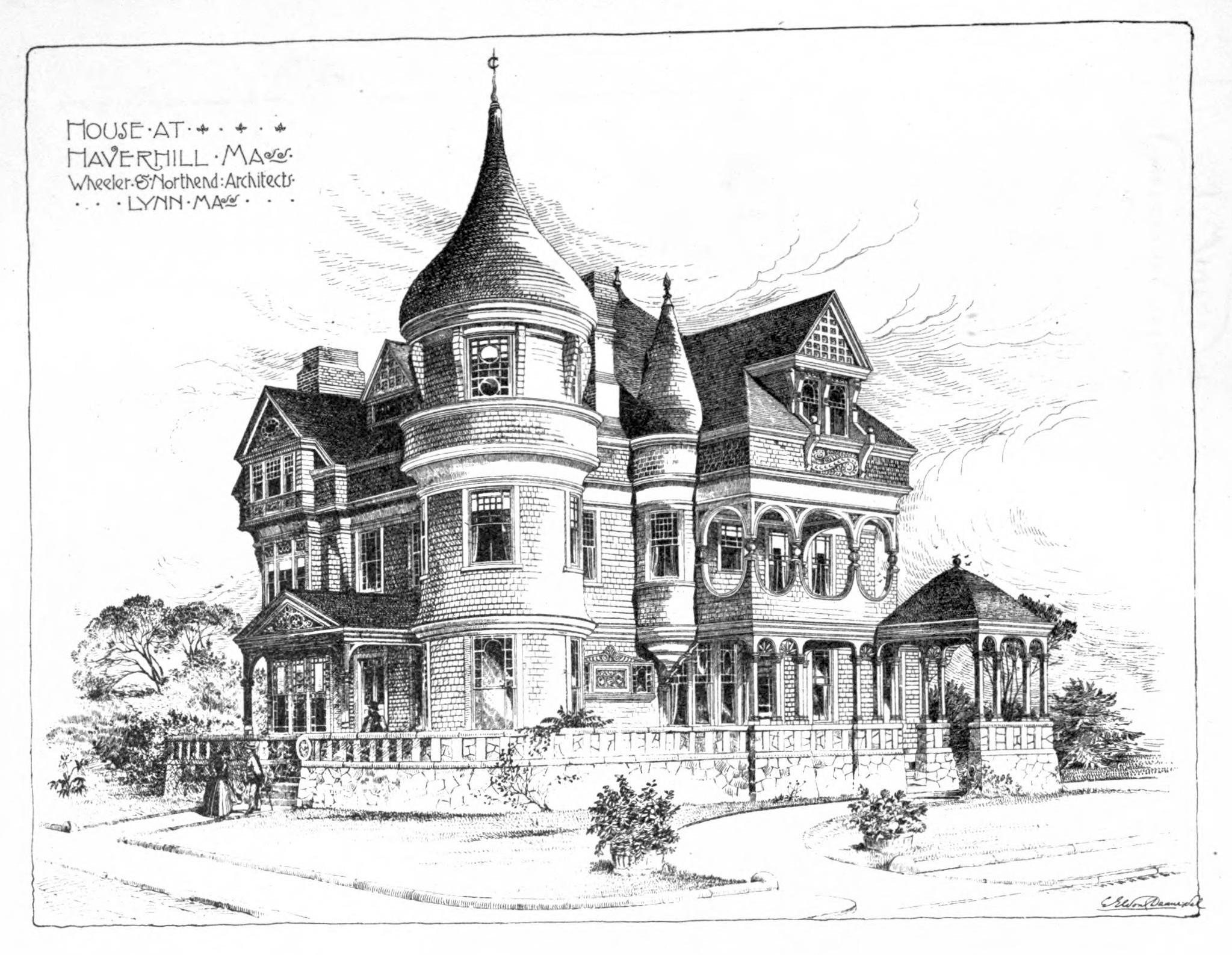
House for Sylvanus P. Gardner, Haverhill, Massachusetts.
E. Eldon Deane, delineator.

== See also ==
- National Register of Historic Places listings in Lynn, Massachusetts
- National Register of Historic Places listings in Essex County, Massachusetts
