= Great Stew Chase =

The Great Stew Chase is a 15-kilometer road running competition held annually in Lynn, Massachusetts. The race website claims that it is the third oldest 15K in the US, having started in 1975. The race is generally held in late February, but has been delayed three times due to weather. The post race food is Beef Stew, hence the race name.
