= Lynn Masonic Hall =

- U.S. National Register of Historic Places
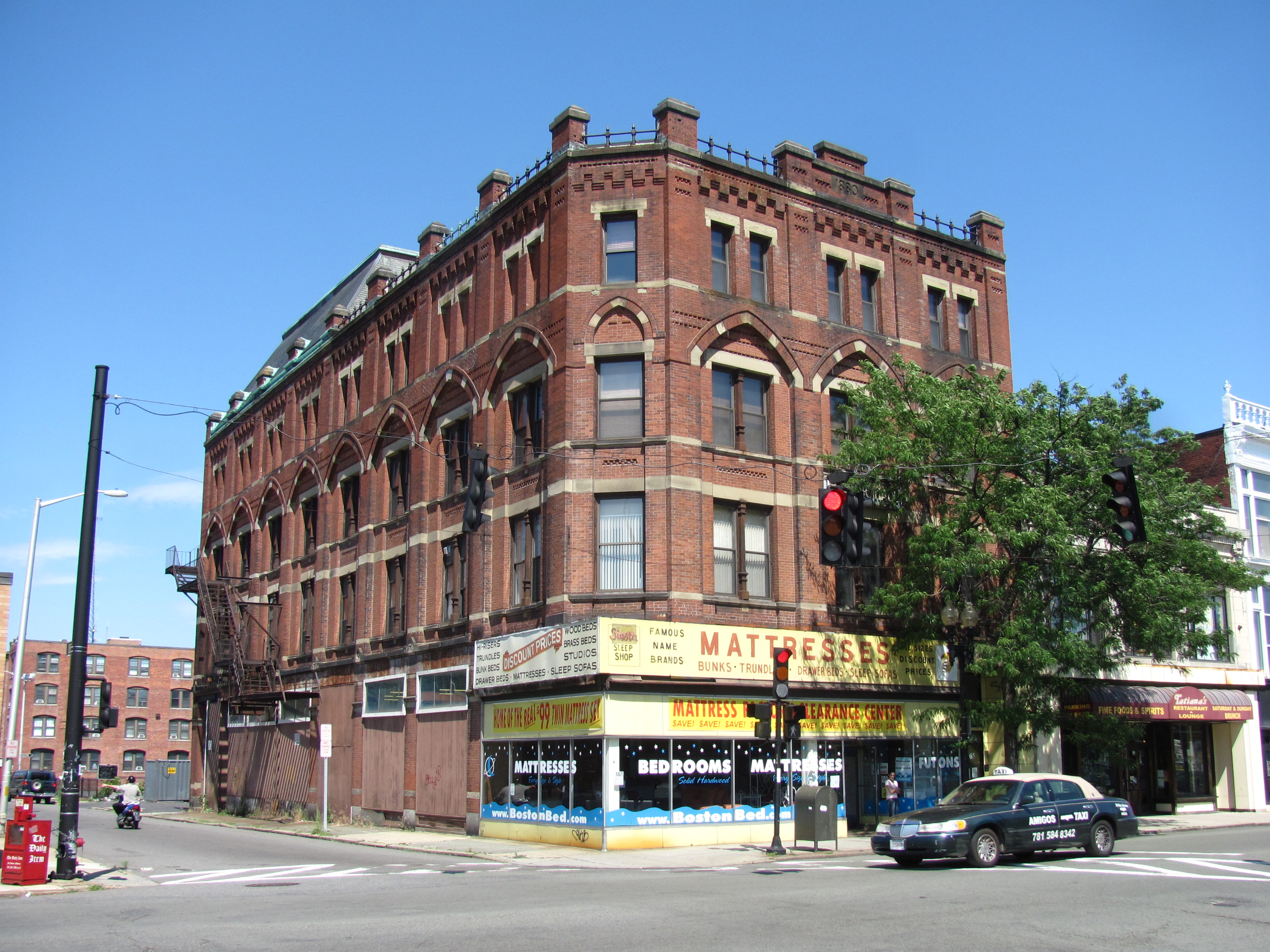
- Lynn Masonic Hall

- Location within Massachusetts Location within the United States
- Location: Lynn, Massachusetts
- Coordinates: 42°27′48″N 70°56′59″W
- Built: 1880
- Architect: Henry J. Preston
- Architectural style: Gothic
- NRHP reference No.: 79000333
- Added to NRHP: August 21, 1979

The Lynn Masonic Hall is a historic Masonic building located at 64-68 Market Street in Lynn, Massachusetts. The four story brick building was built in 1880 for the Lynn branch of YMCA. It is one of two surviving Victorian Gothic buildings in downtown Lynn. YMCA occupied the building until 1907, when it moved to other quarters (no longer there) across the street. The building was sold to the local Masonic lodge.

The building was listed on the National Register of Historic Places in 1979.

== See also ==
- National Register of Historic Places listings in Lynn, Massachusetts
- National Register of Historic Places listings in Essex County, Massachusetts
