= Lynn Armory =

- Lynn, Armory
- U.S. National Register of Historic Places
- U.S. Historic district – Contributing property
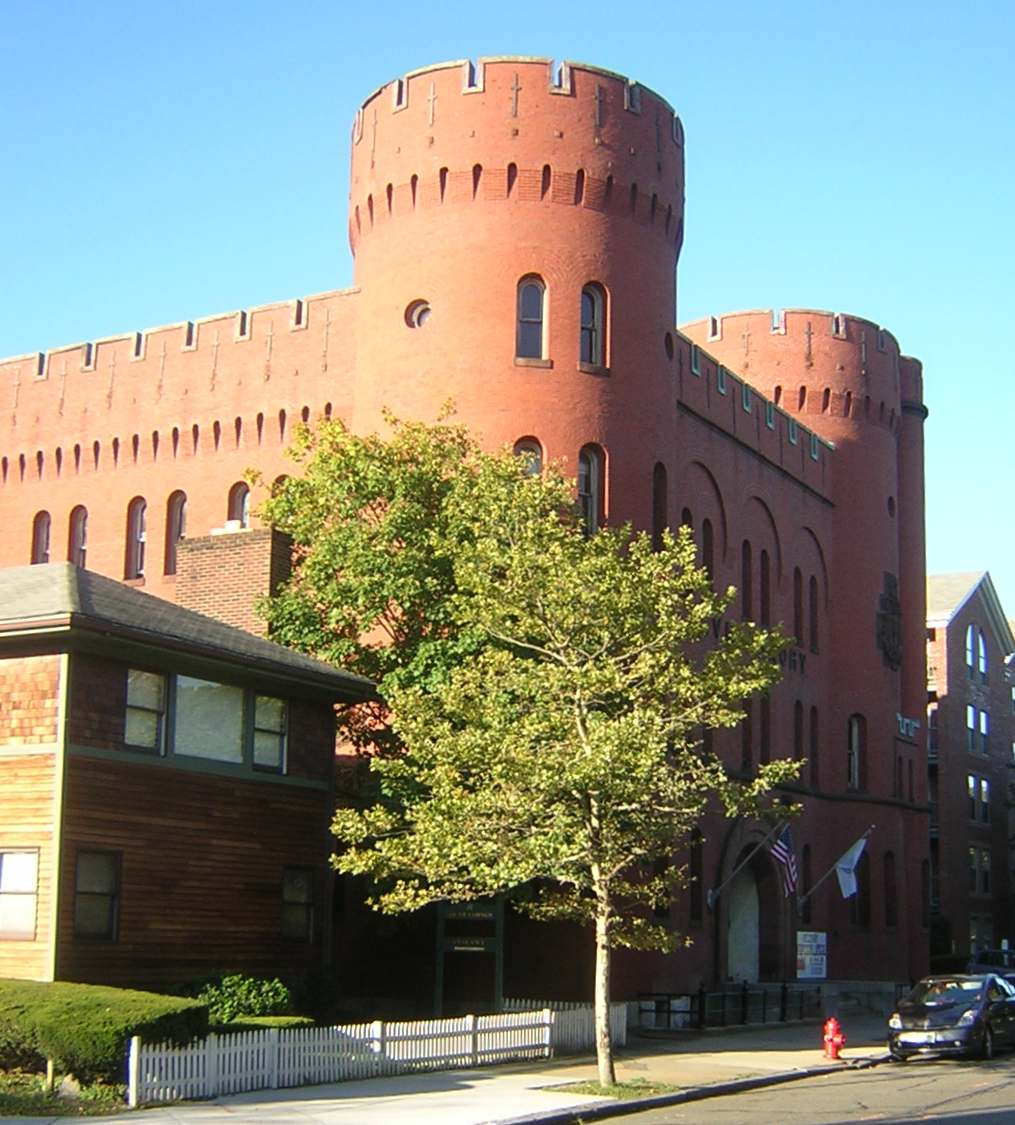

- Location within Massachusetts Location within the United States
- Location: Lynn, Massachusetts
- Coordinates: 42°27′48.5″N 70°57′15.5″W
- Built: 1893
- Architect: Wheeler & Northend
- Architectural style: Romanesque
- Part of: Lynn Common Historic District (ID92000247)
- NRHP reference No.: 79000332

Significant dates
- Added to NRHP: September 7, 1979
- Designated CP: April 10, 1992

The Lynn Armory is a historic armory building at 36 South Common Street in Lynn, Massachusetts. It is one of the best examples of Romanesque Revival architecture in the city. It was built in 1893 out of red sandstone to a design by Wheeler & Northend. It features a head house measuring 68 feet (21 m) wide and 86 feet (26 m) deep, behind which is a drill shed that is 127 feet (39 m) long. The principal features of the facade are designed to evoke a fortified castle: circular towers 22 feet (6.7 m) flank the entrance, and the towers and the facade are topped by a crenellated parapet.

The armory was individually listed on the National Register of Historic Places in 1979, and included in the Lynn Common Historic District in 1992. A total of five Holman K. Wheeler structures in Lynn are listed on the National Register.

In August 2018, Massachusetts Governor Charlie Baker signed into law a bill approving the sale of the armory to a non-profit organization that plans to renovate the facility into apartments for military veterans.

== See also ==
- National Register of Historic Places listings in Lynn, Massachusetts
- National Register of Historic Places listings in Essex County, Massachusetts
