= Tapley Building =

- U.S. National Register of Historic Places
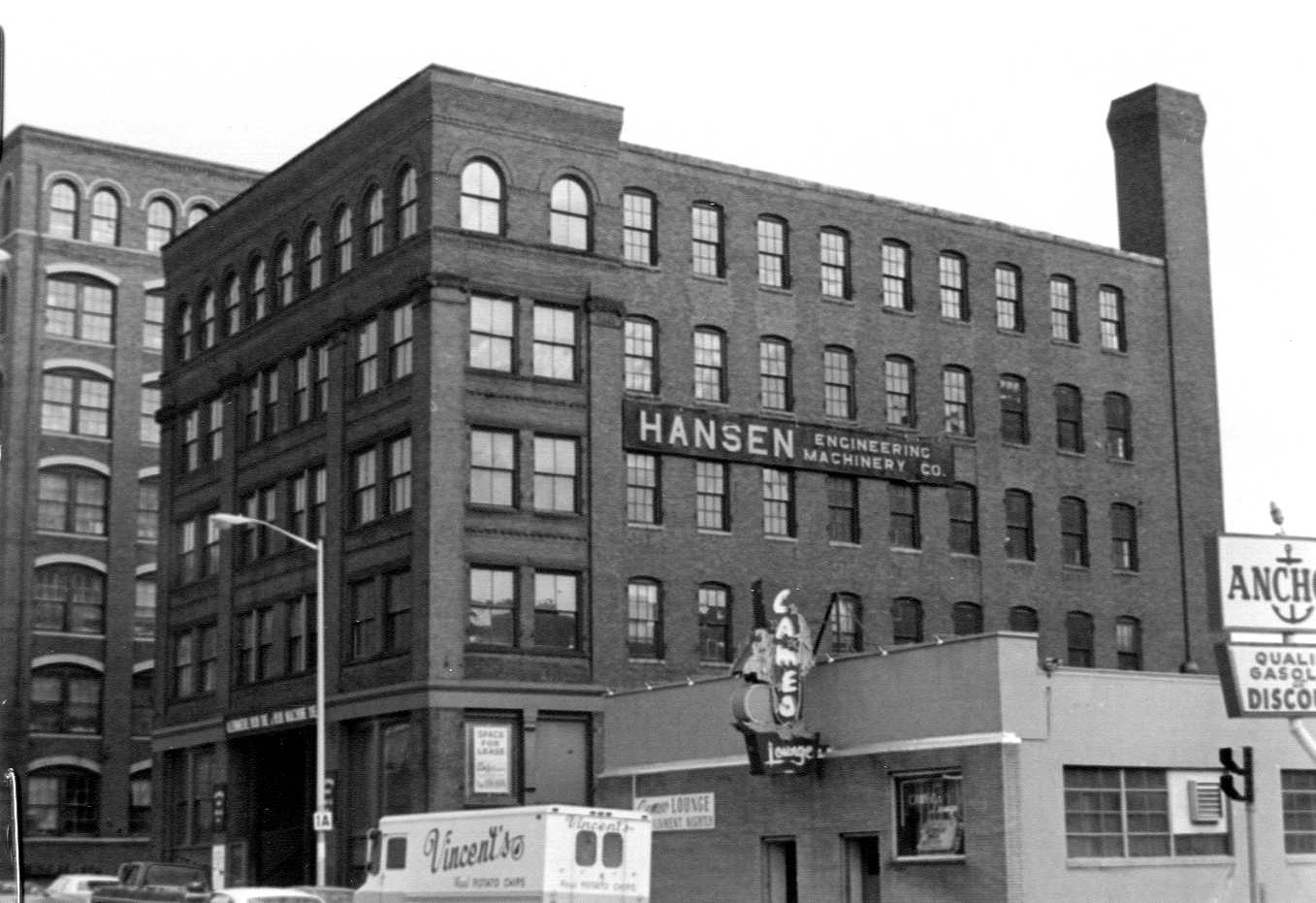
- c. 1977 photo

- Location within Massachusetts Location within the United States
- Location: 206 Broad St., Lynn, Massachusetts
- Coordinates: 42°27′45″N 70°56′41″W
- Built: 1890
- Architect: Wheeler & Northend
- Architectural style: Romanesque
- NRHP reference No.: 83000586
- Added to NRHP: March 31, 1983

The Tapley Building was a historic Romanesque building at 206 Broad Street in Lynn, Massachusetts. The five story brick factory building was built in 1890 to replace an earlier factory, which was destroyed in Lynn's 1889 fire. It was built for the firm founded by Philip P. Tapley, which was one of Lynn's leading shoe manufacturers. It included firesafe construction methods including fireproof stairwells, and two elevators.

It was listed on the National Register of Historic Places in 1983. A total of five Holman K. Wheeler structures in Lynn are listed on the National Register.

The building was destroyed by fire in 1999.

== See also ==
- National Register of Historic Places listings in Lynn, Massachusetts
- National Register of Historic Places listings in Essex County, Massachusetts
