= Mary Baker Eddy House (Lynn, Massachusetts) =

Historic house in Massachusetts, United States

- U.S. National Register of Historic Places
- U.S. National Historic Landmark
- U.S. Historic district – Contributing property
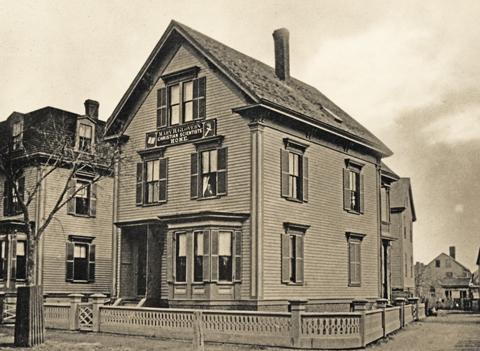
- The house circa 1880

- Location within Massachusetts Location within the United States
- Location: 8 Broad St. Lynn, Massachusetts
- Coordinates: 42°27′50″N 70°56′6″W
- Area: less than one acre
- Built: 1870
- Architectural style: Italianate
- Part of: Diamond Historic District (ID96001040)
- NRHP reference No.: 78000454

Significant dates
- Added to NRHP: January 13, 2021
- Designated NHL: January 13, 2021
- Designated CP: November 22, 1996

The Mary Baker Eddy House is a historic house museum at 8 Broad Street in Lynn, Massachusetts. Built in 1870–71, it was the home of Mary Baker Eddy (1821–1910), founder of the Church of Christ, Scientist, from 1875 to 1882. The house is now owned by the church, which operates it as a historic site devoted to Eddy's life and early church history. The house was designated a National Historic Landmark in 2021, and was included in the Diamond Historic District in 1996.

== Description and history ==
The Mary Baker Eddy House stands in Lynn's Diamond district, a residential area of high-quality 19th-century homes. It is on the south side of Broad Street (US Route 1A), midway between Portland and Atlantic Streets. It is a modest 2 1/2-story wood-frame structure, with a front-facing gabled roof and clapboarded exterior. The gables and eaves are adorned with paired Italianate brackets, and windows are topped by bracketed lintel caps.

The house was built between 1870 and 1871, probably by the builder of a nearby house, with which it shares some architectural features. It was purchased in 1875 by Mary Glover, who married Asa Gilbert Eddy in 1877. She was resident here when the first edition of Science and Health with Key to the Scriptures was published in 1875. In 1882 the Eddys moved to Boston, renting and then selling this property. It was purchased by the local Christian Science church in 1902, and was turned over to the Mother Church in 1916. Since 1906 it has served as an exhibition space for the church.

== See also ==
- National Register of Historic Places listings in Lynn, Massachusetts
- National Register of Historic Places listings in Essex County, Massachusetts
- List of National Historic Landmarks in Massachusetts
