= Grand Army of the Republic Hall (Lynn, Massachusetts) =

- G.A.R. Hall and Museum
- U.S. National Register of Historic Places
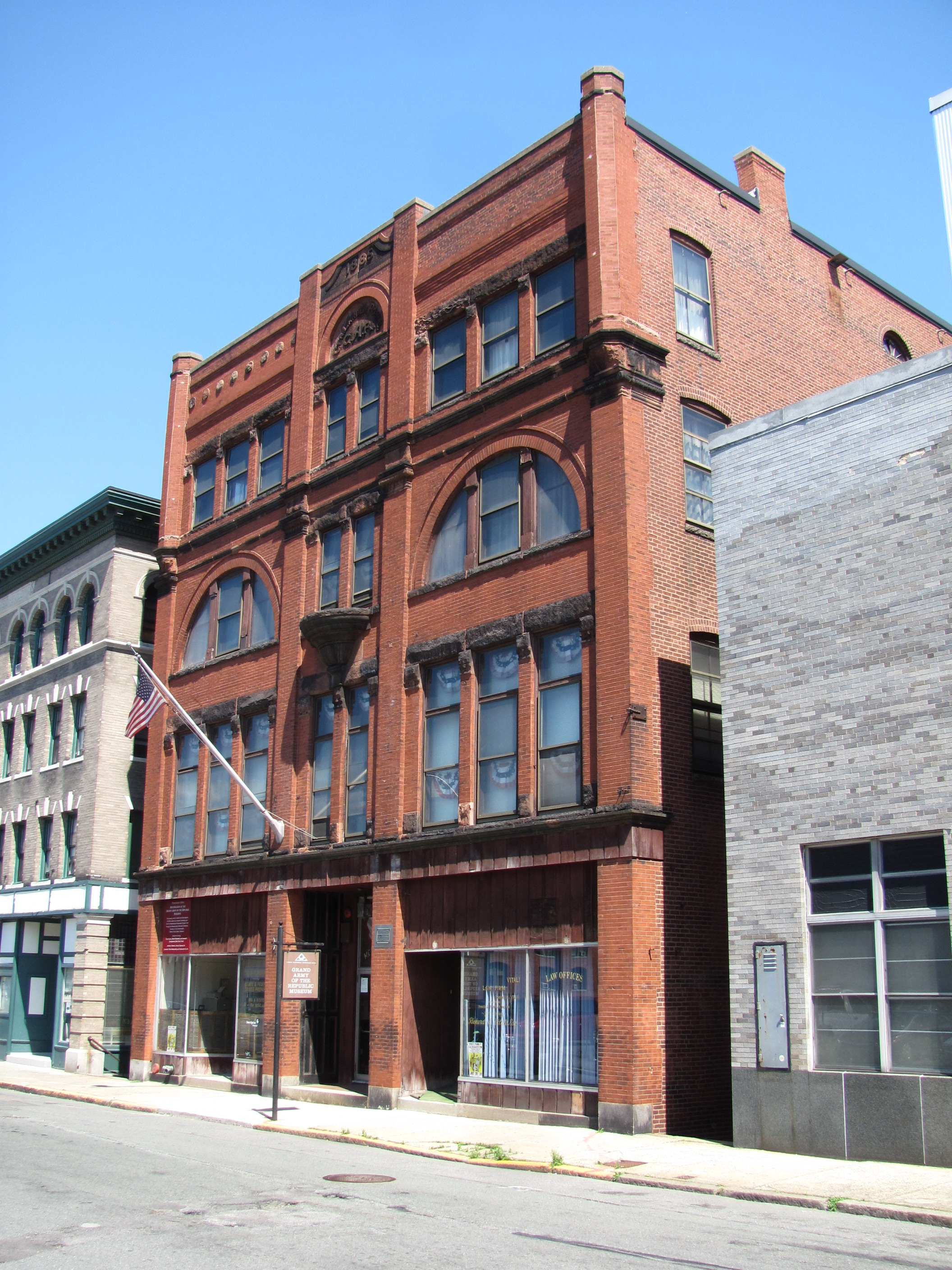
- Grand Army of the Republic Hall

- Location within Massachusetts Location within the United States
- Location: 58 Andrew St., Lynn, Massachusetts
- Coordinates: 42°27′46″N 70°56′53″W
- Built: 1885
- Architect: Wheeler & Northend; Frank Kelly
- Architectural style: Romanesque
- NRHP reference No.: 79000331
- Added to NRHP: May 07, 1979

The Grand Army of the Republic Hall, also known as the General Frederick W. Lander Post No. 5, Grand Army of the Republic, is a historic building in Lynn, Massachusetts, United States.

The hall was built in 1885 by members of the Grand Army of the Republic, a fraternal veterans organization, as a meeting hall and memorial to the Union Army veterans of the Civil War. It was the largest of the many such halls built by the organization's members. Only 13 still exist; this is the only one in Massachusetts.

On May 7, 1979, it was added to the National Register of Historic Places. The hall is now the Grand Army of the Republic Museum.

== History ==
=== Use as GAR post ===
The hall was the meeting place of the General Frederick W. Lander Post No. 5, one of 210 GAR posts in Massachusetts. The father of co-architect William Wheelwright Northend, Massachusetts State Senator William Dummer Northend, while attending Governor Dummer Academy as a child, became longtime friends with Lander.

The four-story Romanesque brick building was built in 1885 by contractor Frank G. Kelly to the design of the Lynn firm Wheeler & Northend. It has two storefronts on the ground floor, offices and a library with spaces for 1,500 volumes on the second floor, and a 46'10" x 56'4" meeting hall on the upper two floors. The roofline's ornate brick crenellations were removed in the mid-20th century. The first two floors have been altered over time, but the meeting hall remains in nearly original condition.

The building was built with incandescent electric lighting by the Thomson-Houston Electric Company, which had moved to Lynn two years earlier.

=== Later use ===
With declining membership in the organization, the building was turned over to the city in 1919 by a Special Act of the Massachusetts Legislature. The city operates it as a museum.

The building was listed on the National Register of Historic Places in 1979. The building is the earliest known work by Holman K. Wheeler, who designed and constructed more than 400 structures in Lynn and surrounding towns, including residences, schools, commercial and factory buildings, and monuments. A total of five H. K. Wheeler structures in Lynn are listed on the National Register.

In 2018, a fundraising campaign was started to raise as much as $10 million for needed repairs, renovations, and preservation of the museum's collection. Plans include making the building ADA compliant with additions such as an elevator. An updated climate control system is also needed to preserve the museum artifacts.

The museum was named one of the top 11 most endangered historic resources in Massachusetts for 2018 by Preservation Massachusetts.

== See also ==
- National Register of Historic Places listings in Lynn, Massachusetts
- National Register of Historic Places listings in Essex County, Massachusetts
- Sons of Union Veterans of the Civil War
