= English High School (1892 building) =

- U.S. National Register of Historic Places
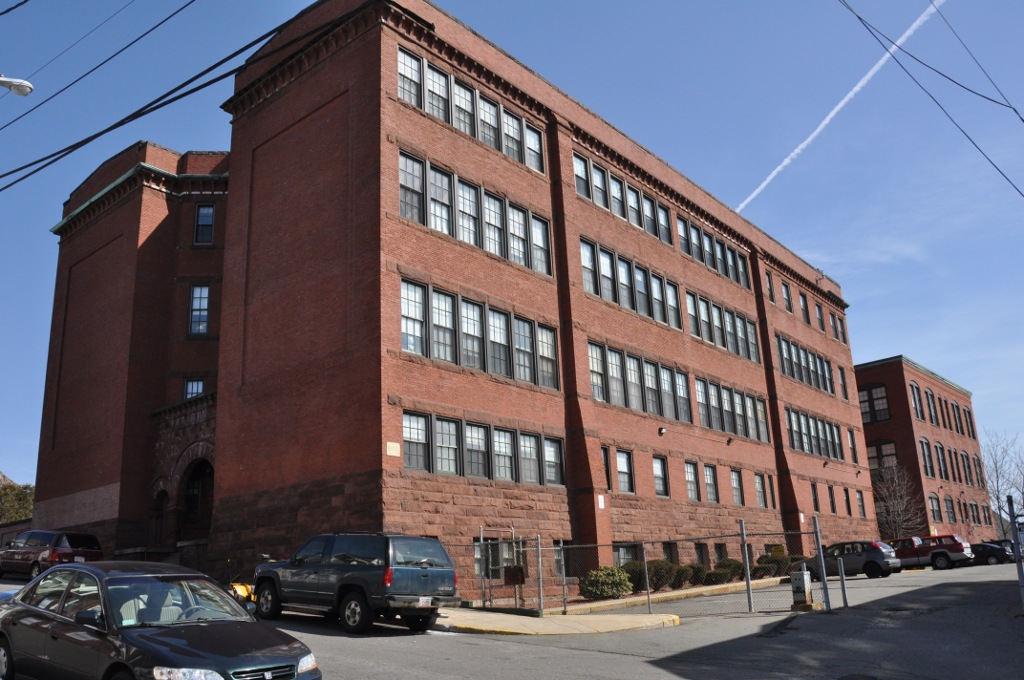

- Location within Massachusetts Location within the United States
- Location: 498 Essex St., Lynn, Massachusetts
- Area: 12 acres (4.9 ha)
- Built: 1892
- Architect: Wheeler & Northend; Cornet, George A.; Wheeler & Johnson
- Architectural style: Tudor Revival, Romanesque, Jacobean Revival
- NRHP reference No.: 86002508

Significant dates
- Expanded: 1916
- Rebuilt: 1924
- Added to NRHP: September 11, 1986

The English High School is a historic former school building at 498 Essex Street in downtown Lynn, Massachusetts. Built in 1892 and enlarged in 1916, it served as the city's second high school until 1932, when the present Lynn English High School building on Goodridge Street was built. This building was listed on the National Register of Historic Places for its architecture in 1986. A total of five Holman K. Wheeler structures in Lynn are listed on the National Register. After serving for many years as a junior high school, it was converted into residential units.

== Description and history ==
The former English High School building stands near downtown Lynn, at the western corner of Liberty and Essex Streets. It is located across Liberty Street from the Old Lynn High School, the city's first high school built in 1850-51. This building consists of two parts, both built of brick. Nearest the Liberty & Essex street corner is a T-shaped three-story section which exhibits Jacobethan styling, built in 1924 to a design by George A. Cornet after a fire on March 29, 1924 destroyed the original 1892 portion. It has a central entrance pavilion with a Tudor arched entry, and slightly projecting end wings, all adorned with parapets at the roof. The leg of the T projects to the rear of this section, and is joined to the four-story second section. It has more Gothic and Romanesque styling, with buttresses between panels of windows, and a corbelled brick cornice.

The oldest portion of this building was the Romanesque portion, which was built in 1892 to a design by Wheeler & Northend. A 1916 addition of similar style facing James street was designed by Wheeler & Johnson. The current main section is a 1924 replacement after a fire destroyed the 1892 section. This school was built to replace the building across Liberty Street, and served the city as a high school until 1932, when the present English High School was built. It then served for many years as a junior high school. When surveyed in 1985, it was vacant. It has since been converted into residences.

== See also ==
- National Register of Historic Places listings in Lynn, Massachusetts
