= Old Lynn High School =

- U.S. National Register of Historic Places
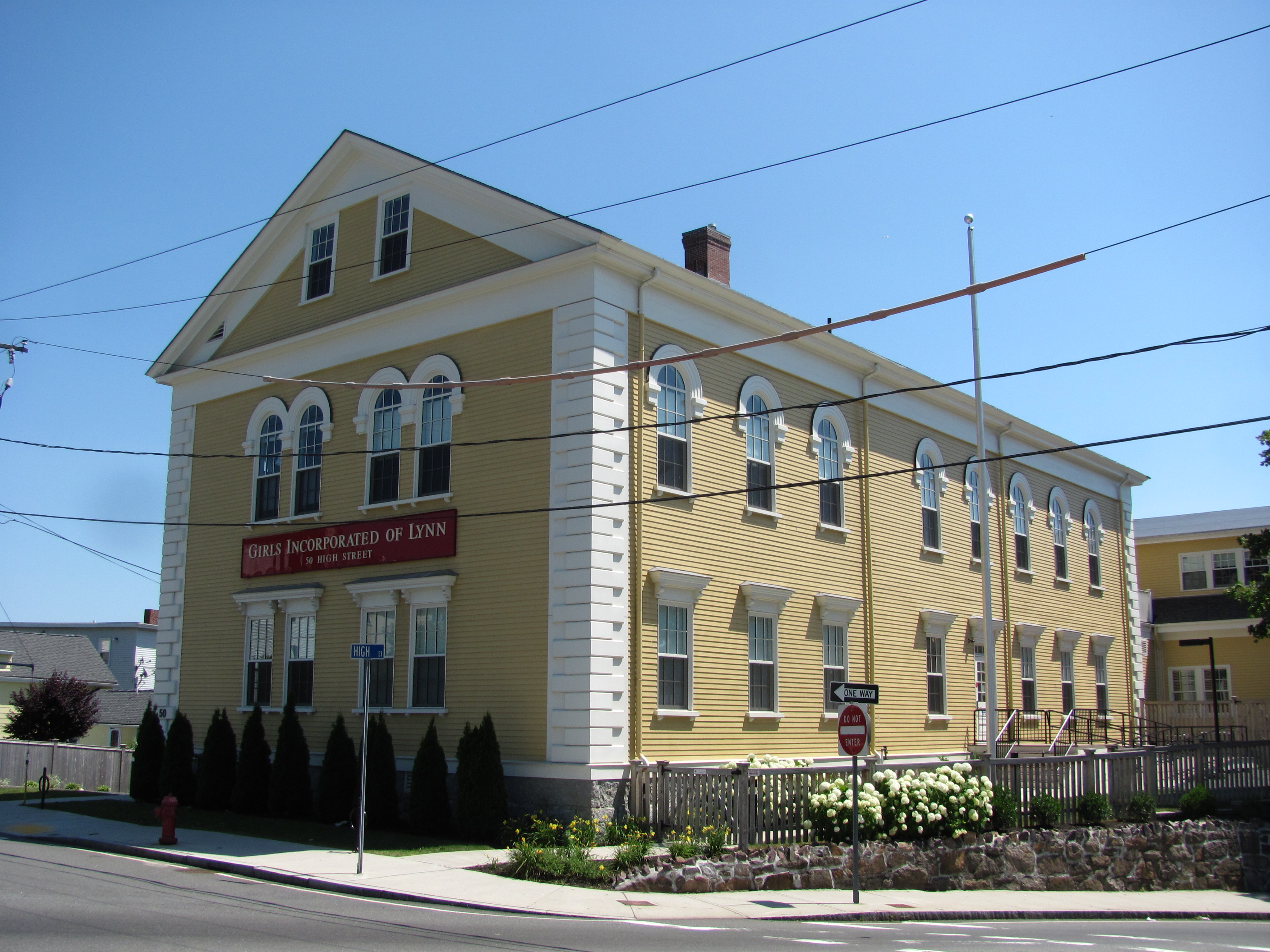
- Old Lynn High School

- Location within Massachusetts Location within the United States
- Location: 50 High St., Lynn, Massachusetts
- Coordinates: 42°27′59.0″N 70°56′45.3″W
- Built: 1851
- Architect: Gridley J. F. Bryant (1850); George A. Cornet (1924)
- Architectural style: Italianate
- NRHP reference No.: 02000130
- Added to NRHP: March 6, 2002

The Old Lynn High School is a historic school at 50 High Street in Lynn, Massachusetts. The two story wood frame Italianate building was built in 1850 and opened to students in 1851. Originally five window bays in length, it was extended in 1876 by the addition of three bays to reach its present size, measuring 45 feet (14 m) by 95 feet (29 m). It sits on a rise overlooking the downtown area in a residential neighborhood.

Inside the building, the first floor shows only traces of its original academic use, having been converted to other uses. The second floor still shows the original classroom layouts, with two classrooms occupying either side of a central hallway in the original part of the building, and a third classroom is contained in the 1876 addition.

The building was used by the city for academic purposes for 124 years. It was the city's first high school until 1892, after which it served as a vocational shop for the English High School, which was built across Liberty Street to the west. In 1924 it became the home of the Lynn Independent Industrial Shoemaking School, which operated in the building until 1975. In 2002 the building had been vacant for some time, and was suffering from neglect and vandalism, including attempted arson. The building was rehabilitated and expanded in a historically sensitive way, and is now the facilities of Girls Incorporated of Lynn.

The building was listed on the National Register of Historic Places in 2002.

== See also ==
- National Register of Historic Places listings in Lynn, Massachusetts
- National Register of Historic Places listings in Essex County, Massachusetts
