= Lynn English High School =

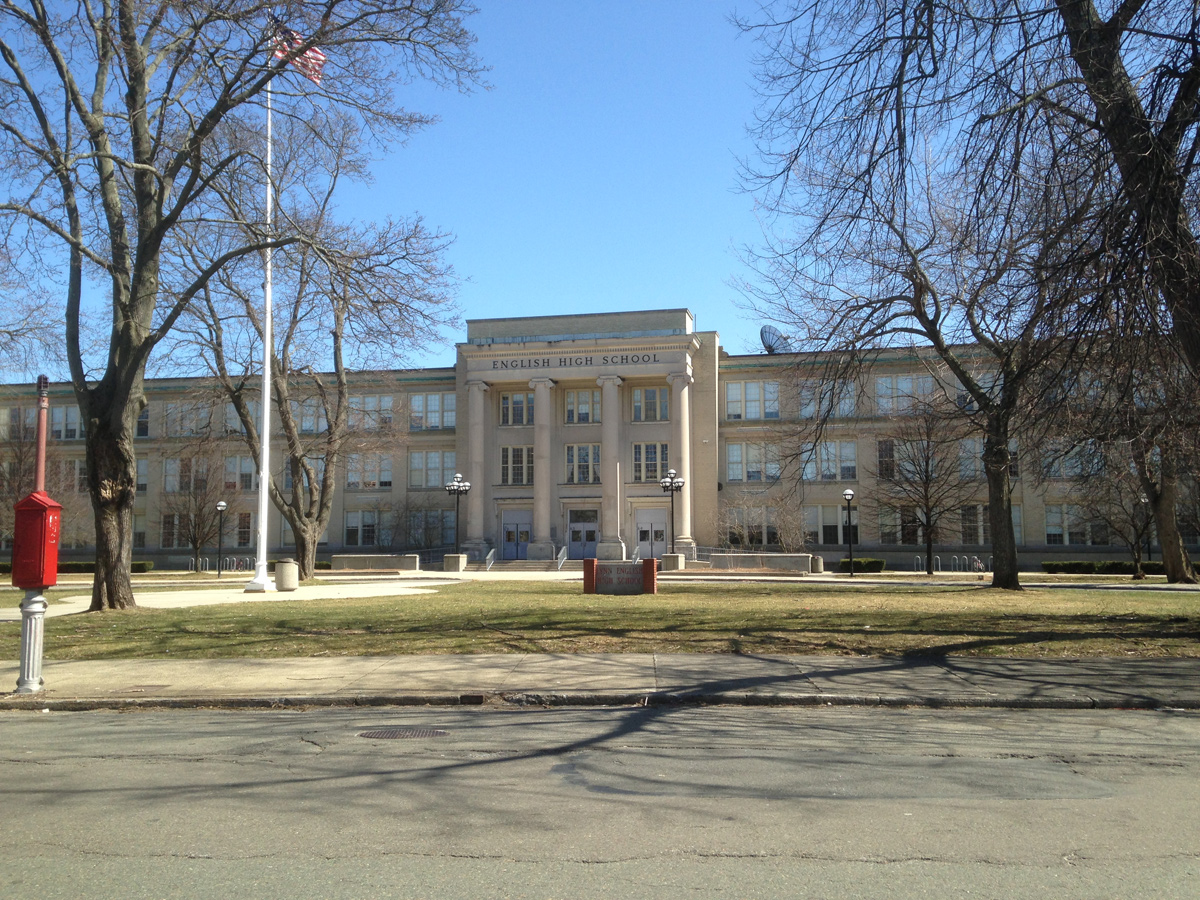

Location
- 50 Goodridge Street; Lynn, Massachusetts 01902; United States

Information
- School type: High school
- School district: Lynn Public Schools
- Superintendent: Evonne Alvarez
- Principal: Rardy L. Peña
- Staff: 136.81 (FTE)
- Enrollment: 2,072 (2023–2024)
- Student to teacher ratio: 15.15
- Colors: Maroon and gray
- Athletics conference: Greater Boston League (GBL)
- Sports: Yes
- Team name: Bulldogs
- Website: www.lynnschools.org/lynn-english-high-school-home

Lynn English High School (LEHS) is a public high school located at 50 Goodridge Street in the eastern section of Lynn, Massachusetts, United States. It is a part of Lynn Public Schools, and the largest school in the Lynn school system.

The name "Lynn English High School" comes from the Boston area secondary education practice of establishing an English secondary school to provide working-class students with curriculum designed to prepare for entry into the workforce directly from high school. This was in contrast to Latin or Classical secondary schools, which provided education on the classics for future academic pursuits such as college, ministry, and further academia. Lynn Classical High School, located in West Lynn, offered a classical education option to Lynn students when it opened. Throughout the later 1900s, the curriculum across Lynn high schools was standardized; currently, both schools offer college preparatory curriculum.

In 2019, the student population was 1,786 according to the Massachusetts Department of Elementary and Secondary Education School Report Card. According to the most recent graduation data in the report card, in 2018 the 4-year graduation rate was 72.7%. Lynn English's faculty consists of 1 principal, 3 vice principals, 8 department heads, 6 guidance counselors, 93 teachers, 1 librarian, and 3 paraprofessionals.

== School history ==
In the mid- to late 1800s, there was one Lynn High School located in downtown Lynn. In 1892, construction of the first English High School in Lynn began on Essex Street. The class of 1889 was the first to graduate from under the Lynn English High School name. According to the Boston Globe, the original building was the biggest non-factory building in Lynn (home to a General Electric plant) and boasted three stories with 60 classrooms, an assembly hall, and "chemical, physics, and botanical laboratories... electrical works and library." The school garnered news attention in 1893 as the first American public school to offer a course in Spanish. In 1907, a complete set of printing presses was installed in the school and "manual training" courses began. A four-story extension of the original Essex Street building was completed in 1914, and in 1916 a $325,000 gymnasium was added. On March 29, 1924, the Essex Street building caught fire with $450,000 of damage. One firefighter was killed.

The school has been in its current location on Goodridge Street in East Lynn since 1931. Construction of the Goodridge St building cost $1,800,000. Upon completion of the Goodridge Street building, it was planned that Lynn English High School would relocate and open under the new name Eastern Senior High School. This meant that Lynn English High School would cease to exist. The Alumni Association staged a parade with over 2000 people, 100 cars, and a drum and bugle corps to protest the new name and demand the Lynn English High School name be retained. Ultimately the name change was cancelled and the new building took the Lynn English name.

The current building was constructed in the shape of an E, which can be seen from an aerial view. A notable feature of the school is the Lincoln Foyer, an entryway adjacent to the auditorium that holds a lifesize statue of Abraham Lincoln. The statue was donated by the class of 1934; a 2010 restoration effort was led by local historian Tim Ring, a Lynn English teacher and alum. For several decades, the boots Abraham Lincoln had worn on the night of his assassination were owned by a Lynn English teacher, Ruth Hatch, who brought them to school and allowed students to wear them before donating the boots to the National Park Service in 1947.

Principal Charles E. Jackson was succeeded in 1927 by Principal Frederick R. Willard. Willard served as the head of the school from 1927 to 1944.

In 2000, alumnus Andrew Fila became principal after being reassigned to the school from Thurgood Marshall Middle School, in a move by the district's superintendent that angered the Lynn school board because other officials were not given an opportunity to apply for the job. In 2010, Fila was implicated in a boys basketball recruiting violation. He ultimately resigned following the Massachusetts Interscholastic Athletic Association investigation.

As of 2019, 60% of students at Lynn English High School speak English as a second language.

On June 23, 2020, Lynn Public Schools Superintendent Patrick Tutwiler announced that Principal Thomas Strangie would not return to his position. Anastasia Tessie Mower, Vice Principal at Lynn Classical High School, was appointed Acting Principal for the 2020–2021 school year. Mower is a Lynn English alumna, as well as a former LEHS English Department Head.

After a search process, Superintendent Tutwiler appointed Dr. John Braga as new principal of LEHS starting July 6, 2021. Braga is fluent in Spanish and Portuguese, and holds a doctorate in education. He had not previously worked in the Lynn Public School system. According to the Daily Item, "LPS said Braga’s experience with and focus on collaboration, instructional leadership, tiered systems of support and culture-building are markers that made him an attractive candidate."

Heading into School Year 2023–2024, Lynn Public Schools lists Rardy L. Peña as principal.

== National recognition ==
- The Lynn English Marine Corps Junior Reserve Officers' Training Corps program has frequently been recognized on a regional and national level. In the fall of 2019, the Lynn English JROTC program was voted the number one JROTC program in its region for the third time since 2000. The JROTC program has also won the National High School Drill Team Championships, most recently winning the 2017 National Championship as well as several individual awards recognizing standout Lynn English JROTC students.
- In December 2008, Lynn English was named to the U.S. News & World Report listing of the Best High Schools in America.
- In March 2009, Lynn English was voted the best Low Income Academic School in Massachusetts by Businessweek Magazine.
- In mid-2009, the school was recognized as an Intel School of Distinction in Mathematics Excellence, receiving significant grant money to expand technology at the school.
- Stand Up 2011 award for “innovative and impactful programs that address bullying”.

== Sports ==
The boys' basketball team won back-to-back Massachusetts Division 1 State Championships in 2019 and 2020.

== Notable alumni ==
- Alice Frances Blood, 1899, chemist and home economics professor
- Ben Bowden, 2013, professional baseball player
- Les Burke, professional baseball player
- John A. Curry, 1951, former president of Northeastern University
- John J. Donovan, 1959, MIT professor, entrepreneur
- Sib Hashian, professional musician, best known as a drummer for the rock band Boston
- Jim Hegan, professional baseball player
- Louise Kirtland (real name Louise Jelly), 1924, actress
- Lyndon LaRouche, 1940, economist
- Jack Noseworthy, 1982, actor
- Mike Pazik, professional baseball player

== Notable faculty ==
- Harry A. Dame, 1915–1917, physical education teacher
- Harold McDevitt, 1915, football coach
- Tom Whelan, coach, athletic director and principal

== Demographic data ==
- Enrollment: 2,400 students
- Hispanic: 75%
- Caucasian: 7%
- Black: 18%
- Asian: 3%

== See also ==
- Old Lynn High School
- English High School (1892 building)
