= List of mayors of Lynn, Massachusetts =

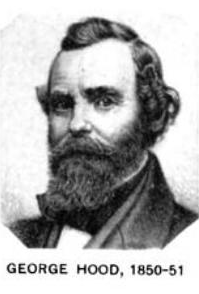
George Hood, the first mayor of Lynn

This is a list of mayors of Lynn, Massachusetts, USA.

The area known today as the city of Lynn was originally part of a larger area named Saugus (part of which lives on as the Town of Saugus). It was renamed "Lynn" in 1637 in honor of King's Lynn in England. Lynn was incorporated as a city in 1850.

== List of mayors ==
| No. | Mayor | Took office | Left office | Tenure | Party | Election |
|---|---|---|---|---|---|---|
| 1 | George Hood (1794–1859) | May 14, 1850 | June 16, 1852 | 2 years, 33 days | Democratic | TBA |
| 2 | Benjamin Franklin Mudge (1817–1879) | June 16, 1852 | April 4, 1853 | 292 days | Unknown | TBA |
| 3 | Daniel C. Baker (1816–1863) | April 4, 1853 | April 3, 1854 | 364 days | Unknown | TBA |
| 4 | Thomas P. Richardson (TBA–TBA) | April 3, 1854 | January 1, 1855 | 273 days | Unknown | TBA |
| 5 | Andrews Breed (1794–1881) | January 1, 1855 | January 7, 1856 | 1 year, 6 days | Whig | TBA |
| 6 | Ezra W. Mudge (1811–1878) | January 7, 1856 | January 4, 1858 | 1 year, 362 days | Democratic | TBA |
| 7 | William F. Johnson (1819–1898) | January 4, 1858 | January 3, 1859 | 364 days | Unknown | TBA |
| 8 | Edward S. Davis (1808–1887) | January 3, 1859 | January 7, 1861 | 2 years, 4 days | Unknown | TBA |
| 9 | Hiram N. Breed (1809–1893) | January 7, 1861 | January 6, 1862 | 364 days | Workingmen's | TBA |
| 10 | Peter M. Neal (1811–1908) | January 6, 1862 | January 1, 1866 | 3 years, 360 days | Republican | TBA |
| 11 | Roland G. Usher (1823–1895) | January 1, 1866 | January 4, 1869 | 3 years, 3 days | Republican | TBA |
| 12 | James N. Buffum (1807–1887); 1st time | January 4, 1869 | January 3, 1870 | 364 days | Republican | TBA |
| 13 | Edwin Walden (1818–1889) | January 3, 1870 | January 1, 1872 | 1 year, 363 days | Unknown | TBA |
| 14 | James N. Buffum (1807–1887); 2nd time | January 1, 1872 | January 6, 1873 | 1 year, 5 days | Republican | TBA |
| 15 | Jacob M. Lewis (1823–1905) | January 6, 1873 | January 1, 1877 | 3 years, 361 days | Unknown | TBA |
| 16 | Samuel M. Bubier (1816–1894) | January 1, 1877 | January 6, 1879 | 2 years, 5 days | Republican | TBA |
| 17 | George Plaisted Sanderson (1836–1915) | January 6, 1879 | January 3, 1881 | 1 year, 363 days | Greenback | TBA |
| 18 | Henry B. Lovering (1841–1911) | January 3, 1881 | January 1, 1883 | 1 year, 363 days | Democratic | TBA |
| 19 | William L. Baird (1843–1916) | January 1, 1883 | January 5, 1885 | 2 years, 4 days | Republican | TBA |
| 20 | John R. Baldwin (1854–1897) | January 5, 1885 | January 4, 1886 | 364 days | Unknown | TBA |
| 21 | George D. Hart (1846–1932) | January 4, 1886 | 1888 | 1–2 years | Unknown | TBA |
| 22 | George C. Higgins (1845–1933) | 1888 | 1889 | 1 year | Republican | TBA |
| 23 | Asa T. Newhall (1846–1937) | 1889 | January 5, 1891 | 1–2 years | Democratic | TBA |
| 24 | E. Knowlton Fogg (1837–1900) | January 5, 1891 | 1892 | 1 year | Republican | TBA |
| 25 | Elihu B. Hayes (1848–1903) | 1892 | 1894 | 2 years | Republican | TBA |
| 26 | Charles E. Harwood (1851–1924) | 1894 | 1896 | 2 years | Republican | TBA |
| 27 | Eugene A. Bessom (1855–1913) | 1896 | 1897 | 1 year | Republican | TBA |
| 28 | Walter L. Ramsdell (1860–1909) | 1897 | 1899 | 2 years | Democratic | TBA |
| 29 | William Shepherd (1837–1907) | 1899 | 1903 | 4 years | Republican | TBA |
| 30 | Henry W. Eastham (TBA–TBA) | 1903 | 1906 | 3 years | Unknown | TBA |
| 31 | Charles Neal Barney (1875–1949) | 1906 | 1908 | 2 years | Republican | TBA |
| 32 | Thomas F. Porter (1847–1927) | 1908 | 1909 | 1 year | Republican | TBA |
| 33 | James E. Rich (1869–1961) | 1909 | 1911 | 2 years | Democratic | TBA |
| 34 | William P. Connery Sr. (1855–1928) | 1911 | 1913 | 2 years | Unknown | TBA (Note: From 1910 to 1917, the mayor was chosen under the commission form of government. The mayoralty was held by the Commissioner of Public Safety.) |
| 35 | George H. Newhall (1850–1923) | 1913 | 1918 | 5 years | Republican | TBA |
| 36 | Walter H. Creamer (1860–1937) | 1918 | 1922 | 4 years | Democratic | TBA (Note: In 1917, the city returned to a mayor and city council form of government.) |
| 37 | Harland A. McPhetres (1892–1972) | 1922 | 1926 | 4 years | Unknown | TBA |
| 38 | Ralph S. Bauer (1867–1941) | 1926 | 1930 | 4 years | Unknown | TBA |
| 39 | J. Fred Manning (1875–1955) | 1930 | 1940 | 10 years | Unknown | TBA |
| 40 | Albert Cole (1904–1966); 1st time | 1940 | 1943 (Note: Cole stepped down to serve in the United States Army in World War II.) | 3 years | Republican | TBA |
| – | Arthur J. Frawley (c. 1899–1969); 1st time | 1943 | 1944 | 1 year | Unknown | – |
| 41 | Arthur J. Frawley (c. 1899–1969); 1st time | 1944 | 1946 | 2 years | Unknown | TBA |
| 42 | Albert Cole (1904–1966); 2nd time | 1946 | 1948 | 2 years | Republican | TBA |
| 43 | Stuart A. Tarr (TBA–TBA) | 1948 | 1952 | 4 years | Unknown | TBA |
| 44 | Arthur J. Frawley (c. 1899–1969); 2nd time | 1952 | 1956 | 4 years | Unknown | TBA |
| 45 | Thomas P. Costin Jr. (1926–2025) | 1956 | July 3, 1961 (Note: Costin resigned to become Postmaster of Lynn.) | 4–5 years | Democratic | TBA |
| 46 | M. Henry Wall (1899–1970) | July 3, 1961 (Note: As city council president, Wall became mayor upon the resignation of Costin.) | 1965 | 3–4 years | Unknown | – |
| 46 | M. Henry Wall (1899–1970) | July 3, 1961 | 1965 | 3–4 years | Unknown | TBA |
| 47 | Irving E. Kane (1930–2019) | 1966 | 1970 | 4 years | Unknown | TBA |
| 48 | J. Warren Cassidy (1930–2024) | 1970 | January 1972 | 1–2 years | Democratic | TBA |
| 49 | Pasquale Caggiano (1909–1972) | January 1972 | April 13, 1972 (Note: Died in office.) | 2–3 months | Democratic | TBA |
| – | Walter F. Meserve (1921–1984); Acting | April 13, 1972 | July 11, 1972 | 89 days | Unknown | – |
| 50 | Antonio J. Marino (1921–2013); 1st time | July 11, 1972 | 1974 | 1–2 years | Unknown | TBA |
| 51 | David L. Phillips (born 1938) | 1974 | 1976 | 2 years | Unknown | TBA |
| 52 | Antonio J. Marino (1921–2013); 2nd time | 1976 | 1986 | 10 years | Unknown | TBA |
| 53 | Albert V. DiVirgilio (born 1942) | 1986 | 1992 | 6 years | Unknown | TBA |
| 54 | Patrick J. McManus (1954–2009) | 1992 | 2002 | 10 years | Unknown | TBA |
| 55 | Edward J. Clancy Jr. (1950–2021) | 2002 | January 4, 2010 | 7–8 years | Democratic | TBA |
| 56 | Judith Flanagan Kennedy (born TBA) | January 4, 2010 | January 3, 2018 | 7 years, 364 days | Republican | TBA |
| 57 | Thomas M. McGee (born 1955) | January 3, 2018 | January 3, 2022 | 4 years, 0 days | Democratic | TBA |
| 58 | Jared C. Nicholson (born 1985) | January 3, 2022 | Incumbent | 4 years, 311 days | Democratic | 2021 |
| 58 | Jared C. Nicholson (born 1985) | January 3, 2022 | Incumbent | 4 years, 311 days | Democratic | 2025 |

== See also ==
- Timeline of Lynn, Massachusetts
