= Henry Eastham =

Henry Eastham may refer to:

- Harry Eastham (1917–1998), English footballer
- Henry W. Eastham, Massachusetts politician
