= Judith Kennedy =

Judith Kennedy may refer to:

- Judy Kennedy, mayor of Newburgh, New York
- Judith Flanagan Kennedy, mayor of Lynn, Massachusetts
