= Senator Hood =

Senator Hood may refer to:

- George Hood (Massachusetts politician) (1806–1859), Massachusetts State Senate
- Morris Hood III (1965–2020), Michigan State Senate
- Thomas Hood (American politician) (1816–1883), Wisconsin State Senate
