= Jacob Lewis =

Jacob Lewis may refer to:

- Jacob M. Lewis, American politician,
- Jacob Lewis (singer), Canadian singer who won the fifth season of Canada's Got Talent
