= Edward J. Clancy Jr. =

American politician (1950–2021)

Edward J. "Chip" Clancy Jr.
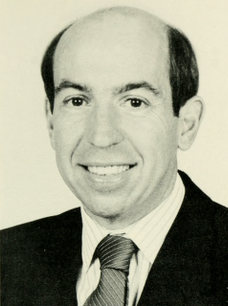
- Clancy, circa 1993

55th Mayor of Lynn, Massachusetts
- In office 2002 – January 4, 2010
- Preceded by: Patrick J. McManus
- Succeeded by: Judith Flanagan Kennedy

Massachusetts State Senate 1st Essex District
- In office 1995–2002
- Preceded by: Walter J. Boverini
- Succeeded by: Thomas M. McGee

Massachusetts House of Representatives 11th Essex District
- In office 1991–1995
- Preceded by: Thomas W. McGee
- Succeeded by: Thomas M. McGee

City Council, Councilor at Large Lynn, Massachusetts
- In office 1984–1991

City Council Lynn, Massachusetts
- In office 1978–1981

Personal details
- Spouse: Linda
- Education: Providence College, Cum Laude (1972); Suffolk University Law School, (1975).
- Profession: Attorney

Edward J. "Chip" Clancy Jr. (June 30, 1950 – June 6, 2021) was an American politician in the state of Massachusetts who served the 55th mayor of Lynn, Massachusetts. He was first elected in November 2001. Previously, Clancy served on the Lynn City Council. After the council, he served in the Massachusetts House of Representatives and the Massachusetts Senate. In 2001, while still a member of the Massachusetts Senate, Clancy was elected as Mayor of Lynn; after his election as Mayor, Clancy resigned from the Senate. On November 3, 2009, he was defeated by challenger Judith Flanagan Kennedy, by a margin of 27 votes.

== Early life ==
Clancy was a native of Lynn, Massachusetts. His parents were Claire M. (Luby) Clancy and Edward J. "Nipper" Clancy, a former political leader and city assessor of Lynn.

== Early career ==
Clancy graduated from Providence College and Suffolk University Law School. On December 15, 1975, Clancy was admitted to the Massachusetts Bar and served as an Assistant Attorney General in the Massachusetts Attorney General's office.

== Lynn City Council ==
In 1977, Clancy was elected to the Lynn, Massachusetts, city council.

== First run for Mayor ==
In 1981 Clancy lost his first campaign for Mayor of Lynn. In the 1981 preliminary election Clancy finished first, receiving 1,393 more votes than incumbent Mayor Antonio J. Marino. However, Mayor Marino defeated Clancy by 3,119 votes in the final election.

== Return to the City Council ==
In 1983 Clancy was once again elected to the Lynn City Council as a City Councilor at large.

== Election to the Massachusetts House of Representatives ==
In 1990 Clancy ran in the Democratic Primary for the Massachusetts House of Representatives. Clancy ran against former Speaker of the House Thomas W. McGee. Initially McGee was declared the winner with a nine-vote victory. However, after a recount Clancy was ahead of McGee by a five-vote margin. After McGee challenged the recount in court, Clancy ended up winning the primary by an 11-vote margin. Clancy went on to defeat Republican Kimberly P. Simone and win the general election in November 1990.

== Election to the Massachusetts Senate ==
In April 1994 Massachusetts State Senator Walter J. Boverini (D-Lynn) announced that he would not run for reelection the State Senate. Clancy ran for and won the Democratic Party's nomination for the seat being vacated by Boverini.

In November 1994 Clancy won the general election for State Senate seat from the 1st Essex District.

Clancy garnered 29,637 votes or 55% of the vote vs Republican Kathleen E. Caron's 24,663 votes or 45% of the total votes cast.

== Election as Mayor of Lynn ==
Clancy ran unopposed in his first two elections for the Mayor of Lynn. On November 3, 2009, Clancy was defeated by Judith Flanagan Kennedy by a total of 8,043 votes to 8,016.

== Later life and death ==
Clancy continued to practice law and remained active in the community. He died on June 6, 2021, at the age of 70, with his wife Linda and family by his side.

== Election history ==
=== 2009 Lynn Mayoral Election ===
Primary Election
Party	Candidate	Votes	%	±%
Nonpartisan	Judith Flanagan Kennedy (Write-in)	3,235	46.37	
Nonpartisan	Edward J. Clancy Jr.	3,024	43.34	
Nonpartisan	David M. Rohnstock	664	9.52	
Write-in	Write-in	54	0.77	
Turnout				

Source: Our Campaigns

General Election
Party	Candidate	Votes	%	±%
Nonpartisan	Judith Flanagan Kennedy	8,043	49.94	
Nonpartisan	Edward J. Clancy Jr.	8,016	49.78	
Write-in	Write-in	45	0.28	
Turnout		16,104	33.1	

Source: Boston Globe Lynn Item

Political offices
Preceded by Patrick J. McManus	Mayor of Lynn, Massachusetts; 2002 to 2009	Succeeded by Judith Flanagan Kennedy
