= George Hood =

George Hood may refer to:

- George Hood (aviator), New Zealand aviator who vanished while attempting the first flight from Australia to New Zealand, 1928
- George Hood (Massachusetts politician) (1806–1859), Massachusetts politician
- George E. Hood (1875–1960), U.S. Representative from North Carolina
- George Hood, former U.S. Marine and isometric exercise record-holder
