= Walter L. Ramsdell =

American politician (1860–1909)

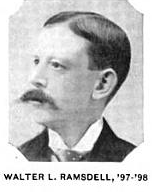

28th Mayor of Lynn, Massachusetts
- In office 1897–1898
- Preceded by: Eugene A. Besson
- Succeeded by: William Shepherd

Personal details
- Born: June 26, 1860 Bridgewater, Massachusetts
- Died: August 25, 1909 (aged 49) Danvers, Massachusetts
- Party: Democrat
- Occupation: Printer

Walter Lawrence Ramsdell (26 June 1860 – 25 August 1909) was a Massachusetts politician who served as the 28th Mayor of Lynn, Massachusetts.

In 1898, Ramsdell was the nominee of the Democratic party for election to congress from Massachusetts's 7th congressional district, losing to future Congressman Ernest W. Roberts. In 1899, Ramsdell won the Democratic nomination for Massachusetts State Auditor, but dropped out of the race. He was replaced on the Democratic ticket by E. Gerry Brown.

He died in 1909 at Danvers.

== Notes ==
Political offices
Preceded by Eugene A. Besson	Mayor of Lynn, Massachusetts; 1897 to 1898	Succeeded by William Shepherd
