= Samuel M. Bubier =

American politician

Samuel Mansfield Bubier
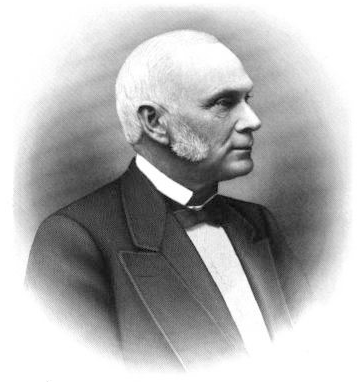

16th Mayor of Lynn, Massachusetts
- In office January 1, 1877 – January 6, 1879
- Preceded by: Jacob M. Lewis
- Succeeded by: George P. Sanderson

Member of the Board of Aldermen of Lynn, Massachusetts
- In office 1871–1871

Personal details
- Born: June 28, 1816 Lynn, Massachusetts
- Died: October 5, 1894 (aged 78) Lynn, Massachusetts
- Party: Republican
- Spouse: Mary Wallace Todd
- Children: Samuel Arthur Bubier
- Profession: Shoe Manufacturer

Samuel Mansfield Bubier (June 28, 1816 – October 5, 1894) was a Massachusetts shoe manufacturer and politician who served as a member of the Board of Aldermen and as the 16th Mayor of Lynn, Massachusetts.

== Notes ==
Political offices
Preceded by Jacob M. Lewis	Mayor of Lynn, Massachusetts; January 1, 1877 to January 6, 1879	Succeeded by George P. Sanderson
