= Peter M. Neal =

American politician

Peter Morrell Neal
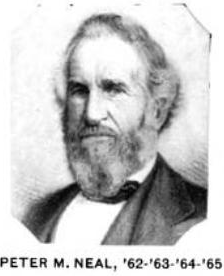

10th Mayor of Lynn, Massachusetts
- In office January 6, 1862 – January 1, 1866
- Preceded by: Hiram N. Breed
- Succeeded by: Roland G. Usher

Personal details
- Born: September 21, 1811 North Berwick, Maine
- Died: April 13, 1908 (aged 96) Lynn, Massachusetts
- Party: Free Soil, Republican
- Children: William E. Neal

Peter Morrell Neal (September 21, 1811 – April 13, 1908) was a Massachusetts politician who served in both branches of the Massachusetts legislature and was the tenth Mayor of Lynn, Massachusetts.

Neal was the grandfather of Lynn's thirty-first mayor, Charles Neal Barney.

== See also ==
- 1876 Massachusetts legislature

== Notes ==
Political offices
Preceded by Hiram N. Breed	Mayor of Lynn, Massachusetts; January 6, 1862 to January 1, 1866	Succeeded by Roland G. Usher
