= 1887 Massachusetts gubernatorial election =

- November 8, 1887
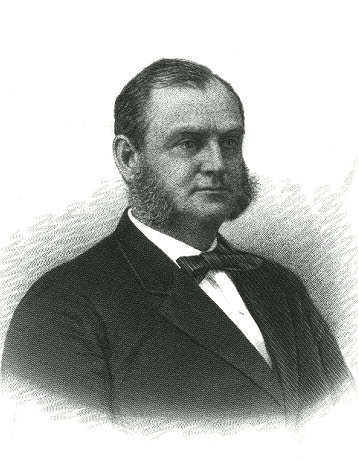

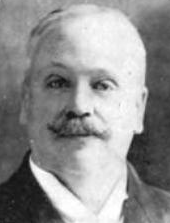
Nominee	Oliver Ames	Henry B. Lovering
Party	Republican	Democratic
Popular vote	136,000	118,394
Percentage	51.12%	44.50%
- Ames: 30-40% 40-50% 50–60% 60–70% 70–80% 80–90% >90% Lovering: 30-40% 40-50% 50–60% 60–70% Tie: 40-50% 50%
Governor before election
Oliver Ames
Republican
Elected Governor
Oliver Ames
Republican

The 1887 Massachusetts gubernatorial election was held on November 8, 1887. Incumbent Republican governor Oliver Ames was re-elected to a second term in office, defeating Democratic former U.S. representative Henry B. Lovering.

== General election ==
=== Candidates ===
- Oliver Ames, incumbent governor (Republican)
- William H. Earle (Prohibition)
- Henry B. Lovering, former U.S. representative and mayor of Lynn (Democratic)
- Charles E. Marks (Labor)

=== Results ===
1887 Massachusetts gubernatorial election
Party	Candidate	Votes	%	±%
Republican	Oliver Ames (incumbent)	136,000	51.12%	▲0.93
Democratic	Henry B. Lovering	118,394	44.50%	▼1.81
Prohibition	William H. Earle	10,945	4.11%	▲0.72
Labor	Charles E. Marks	595	0.22%	N/A
Write-in	All others	98	0.04%	▼0.01
Total votes		266,032	100.00%	

== See also ==
- 1887 Massachusetts legislature
