= David L. Phillips =

American politician (born 1938)

51st Mayor of Lynn, Massachusetts
- In office 1974–1975
- Preceded by: Antonio J. Marino
- Succeeded by: Antonio J. Marino

Personal details
- Born: November 19, 1938 (age 87)

David L. Phillips (born November 19, 1938) is an American former politician in the state of Massachusetts who served as the 51st Mayor of Lynn, Massachusetts.

== Political career ==
Phillips was elected in 1973, beating the incumbent Tony Marino by a few hundred votes. He held the office for a two-year term, and was defeated at re-election by Marino in 1975.

== Notes ==
Political offices
Preceded by Antonio J. Marino	Mayor of Lynn, Massachusetts; 1973 to 1975	Succeeded by Antonio J. Marino
