= Judith Flanagan Kennedy =

American politician

56th Mayor of Lynn, Massachusetts
- In office January 4, 2010 – January 3, 2018
- Preceded by: Edward J. Clancy Jr.
- Succeeded by: Thomas M. McGee

Personal details
- Party: Republican
- Profession: Attorney

Judith Flanagan Kennedy was the 56th mayor of Lynn, Massachusetts. She had previously served as a member of the Lynn School Committee from 1991 to 1997 and had been a councilor-at-large from 1997 to 2009. She launched a write-in campaign for mayor after the death of candidate Patrick J. McManus. She defeated incumbent Edward J. Clancy Jr. on November 3, 2009; 8,043 votes to 8,016. She was Lynn's first female mayor. In 2013 she was elected to a second four-year term. She was defeated in the 2017 election by Democratic state senator Thomas M. McGee.

== Election history ==
=== 2009 Lynn mayoral election ===
Primary election
Party	Candidate	Votes	%	±%
Nonpartisan	Judith Flanagan Kennedy (write-in)	3,235	46.37	
Nonpartisan	Edward J. Clancy Jr.	3,024	43.34	
Nonpartisan	David M. Rohnstock	664	9.52	
Write-in	Write-in	54	0.77	
Turnout				

Source: City of Lynn September 2009 primary voting results

General election
Party	Candidate	Votes	%	±%
Nonpartisan	Judith Flanagan Kennedy	8,043	49.94	
Nonpartisan	Edward J. Clancy Jr.	8,016	49.78	
Write-in	Write-in	45	0.28	
Turnout		16,104	33.1	

Source: City of Lynn November 2009 voting results

Political offices
Preceded by Edward J. Clancy Jr.	Mayor of Lynn, Massachusetts; 2010 to 2018	Succeeded by Thomas M. McGee
