= Thomas P. Costin Jr. =

American politician (1926–2025)

45th Mayor of Lynn, Massachusetts
- In office 1956 – July 3, 1961
- Preceded by: Arthur J. Frawley
- Succeeded by: M. Henry Wall

Member of the Lynn, Massachusetts City Council
- In office 1947–1955
- Preceded by: Arthur J. Frawley

Personal details
- Born: August 23, 1926 Lynn, Massachusetts, U.S.
- Died: August 11, 2025 (aged 98) Beverly, Massachusetts, U.S.
- Party: Democratic
- Spouse: Rosemary

Military service
- Allegiance: United States of America
- Branch/service: U.S. Marines
- Battles/wars: World War II

Thomas P. Costin Jr. (August 23, 1926 – August 11, 2025) was an American politician in the state of Massachusetts who served as the 45th Mayor of Lynn, Massachusetts.

== Life and career ==
Costin was born in Lynn, Massachusetts, on August 23, 1926. He served during World War II with the United States Marine Corps. He served eight years on the Lynn City Council before being elected mayor in 1956. At the age of 29, he became the youngest mayor in Lynn's history.

As mayor, he proposed and spearheaded an urban renewal plan which targeted the Brickyard neighborhood of Lynn in an effort to make the city more attractive to industry and give it the ability to compete with surrounding communities' shopping malls but the program ultimately failed to deliver on its promises.

A close friend of John F. Kennedy, Costin led the voter registration drive during Kennedy's 1958 Senate Reelection campaign. Costin was a Kennedy delegate to the 1960 Democratic National Conventions. Costin was appointed Lynn District postmaster by the President in 1961. He served as Postmaster until 1992. He was reportedly a finalist for the position of United States Postmaster General in 1976. In late 2018, the Post Office building in which Costin served as postmaster was renamed in his honor by an Act of Congress. The official dedication ceremony was held on May 24, 2019.

Costin's nephew, Michael Costin, was killed in an altercation with Thomas Junta in 2000, which garnered nationwide attention as the "hockey dad" case.

In August 2020, Costin led a rally against proposed cuts to the U.S. Postal Service.

Costin died at a hospital in Beverly, Massachusetts, on August 11, 2025, at the age of 98.

== Notes ==
Political offices
Preceded by Arthur J. Frawley	Mayor of Lynn, Massachusetts; 1956 to July 3, 1961	Succeeded by M. Henry Wall
