= Lynn Memorial City Hall and Auditorium =

- U.S. National Register of Historic Places
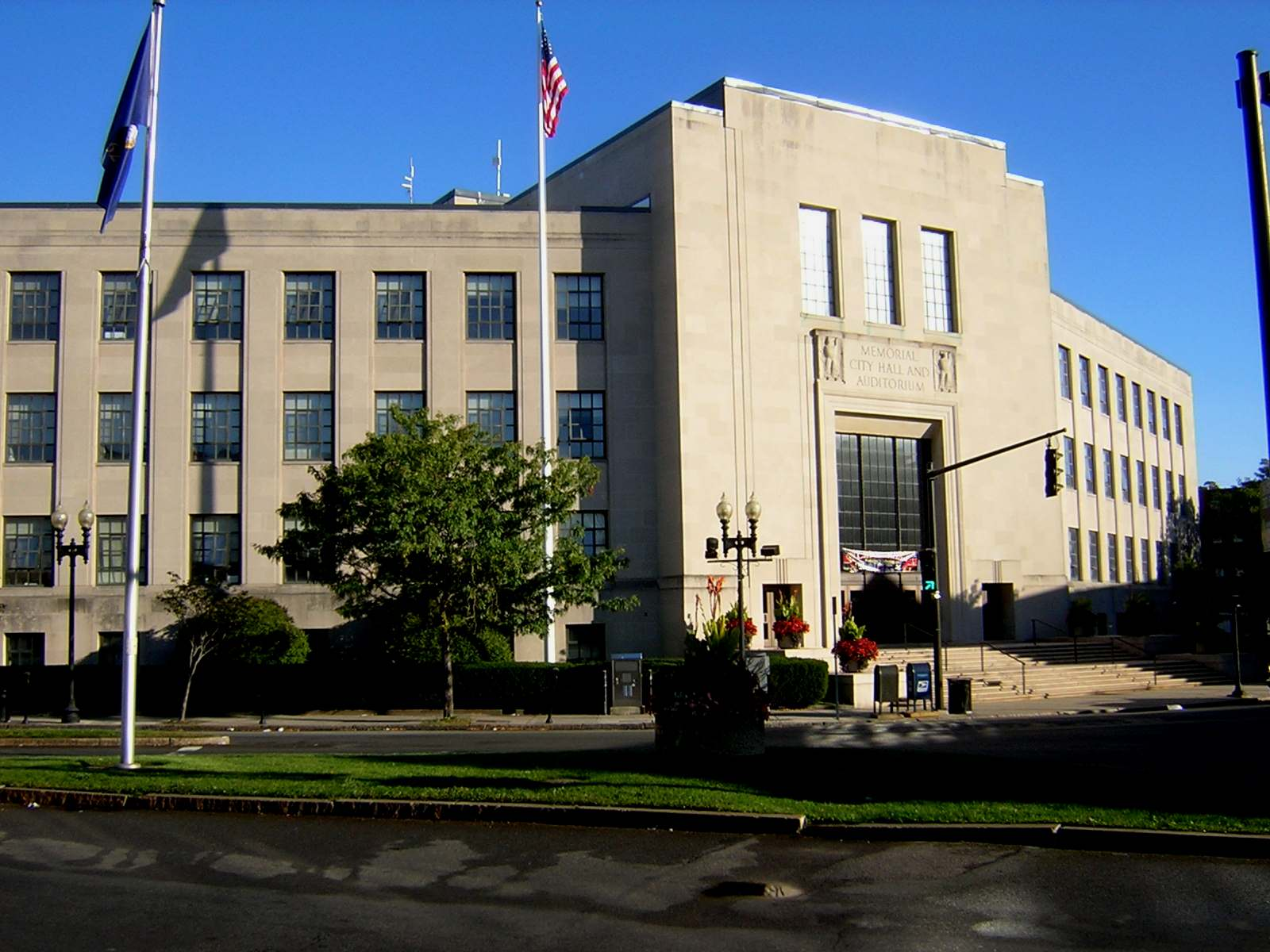

- Location within Massachusetts Location within the United States
- Location: Lynn, Massachusetts
- Coordinates: 42°27′53″N 70°57′6″W
- Architect: M.A. Dyer Company; John Bowen Company
- Architectural style: Art Deco
- NRHP reference No.: 05000082
- Added to NRHP: February 24, 2005

The Lynn Memorial City Hall and Auditorium is a large Art Deco building that defines the civic heart of Lynn, Massachusetts. The building serves three functions: it houses the city's principal offices, including the mayor's office and the chambers of the city council; it memorializes the city's fallen in the nation's military conflicts; and it houses a large public performance space, with a seating capacity over 2,000. It is located at Three City Hall Square.

The building was constructed in 1948-49 by the M.A. Dyer Company and John Bowen Company. Lynn's mayor Albert Cole was the driving force behind the design and construction of the building, which was added to the National Register of Historic Places in 2005.

== Gallery ==
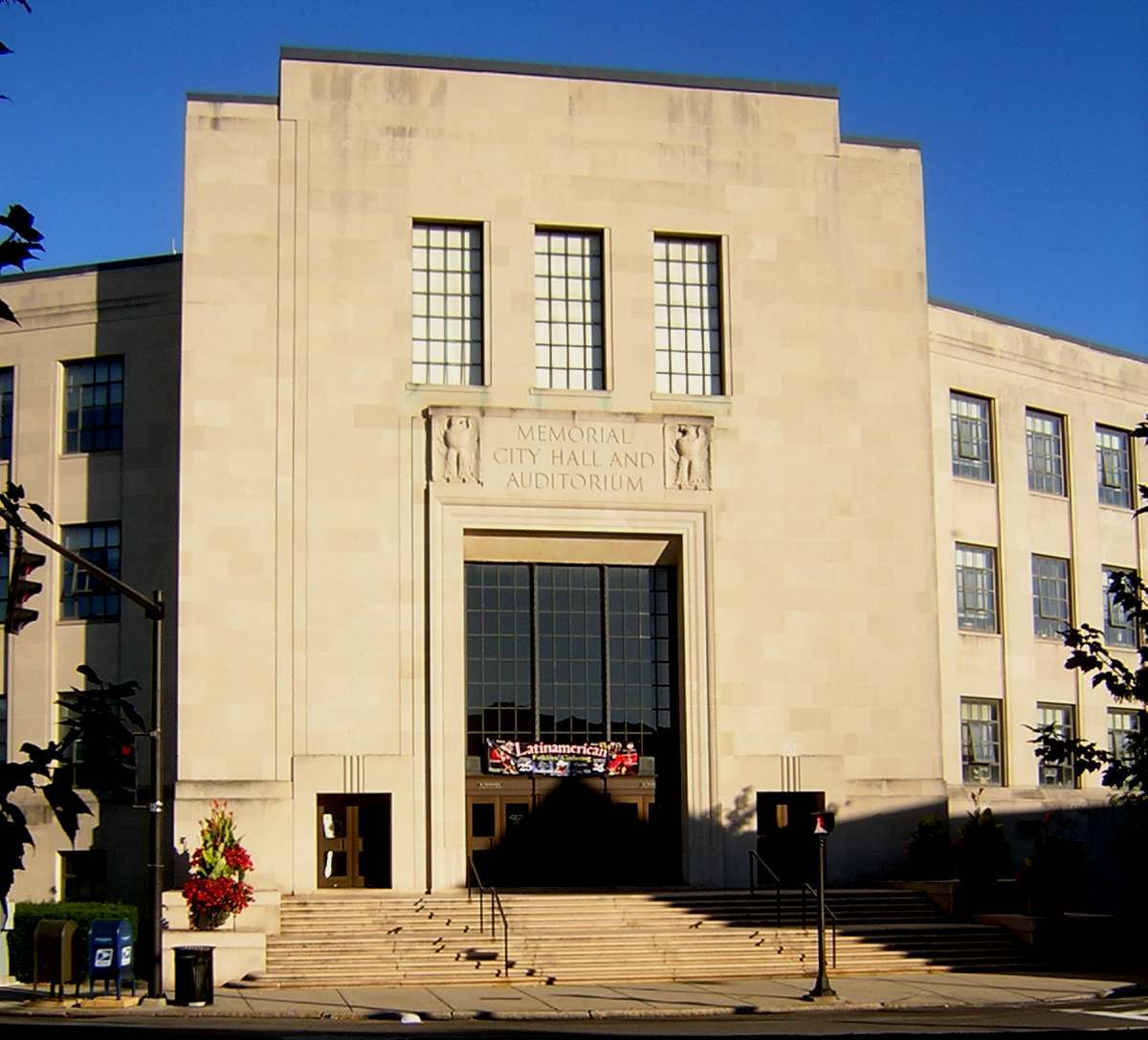

== See also ==
- National Register of Historic Places listings in Lynn, Massachusetts
- National Register of Historic Places listings in Essex County, Massachusetts
