= Harland A. McPhetres =

American politician (1892–1972)

37th Mayor of Lynn, Massachusetts
- In office 1922–1925
- Preceded by: Walter H. Creamer
- Succeeded by: Ralph S. Bauer

Personal details
- Born: February 8, 1892 Dexter, Maine, U.S.
- Died: May 3, 1972 (aged 80) Bedford, Massachusetts, U.S.
- Resting place: Pine Grove Cemetery; Lynn, Massachusetts
- Spouses: Marion E. McPhetres (m. 1919; div. 1930); Arlene F. Hulburt (m. 1932, divorced); Ethel Linea Anderson ()
- Children: 1

Harland Amos McPhetres (February 8, 1892 – May 3, 1972) was an American politician who served as the 37th Mayor of Lynn, Massachusetts.

== Early life ==
McPhetres was born in Dexter, Maine, and moved to Lynn at the age of 15. His father, George H. McPhetres, was the city's street commissioner for many years. McPhetres took the manual training course at Lynn English High School and graduated in 1911. Afterwards, he attended law school, worked as an insurance investigator, and was assistant assessor for the city of Lynn. During World War I, he served in France with the 101st Field Artillery Regiment and was wounded in April 1918. On May 10, 1919, he married his first wife, Marion, in Saugus, Massachusetts. They had one child together.

== Mayoralty ==
Lynn mayor Walter H. Creamer had a number of disagreements with the city's World War I veterans, and members of the city's American Legion post decided to have McPhetres, the post's commander, challenge him in the 1921 election. His campaign was staffed by ex-servicemen and his wife ran his campaign office. On election day, Creamer was declared the winner by 58 votes. However, a recount found that McPhetres had won by 86 votes. The two faced off again in the 1923 election, which McPhetres won by a two to one margin. He did not run for reelection in 1925.

== Later life ==
Prior to leaving office, McPhetres opened a Cleveland dealership in Lynn. His wife filed for divorce in 1930 and two years later he married Arlene F. Hulbert in a private ceremony. Hulbert, who was fifteen year's McPhetres' junior, had received her high school diploma from McPhetres when he was mayor. The couple moved to Springfield, Massachusetts, where McPhetres worked for a finance company. He later returned to Lynn, where he sold fire alarms. In 1941, the superintendent of the Essex County Training School accused McPhetres of borrowing equipment he sold to the school in never returning it. McPhetres denied the accusations and the missing equipment was found in the school's attic, where it had been stored for over five years.

In 1929 and 1935, McPhetres was an unsuccessful candidate for mayor of Lynn; losing both times to J. Fred Manning.

McPhetres was a captain in the Military Police Corps during World War II. After the war, he served as executive director of the Lynn Housing Authority. In 1953, he was appointed director of the Massachusetts housing board.

McPhetres died on May 3, 1972 at the Veterans Administration Hospital in Bedford, Massachusetts. He was survived by his third wife, Ethel Linea Anderson.
