= Roland G. Usher =

American politician

Roland Greene Usher
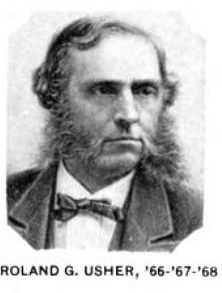

Member of the Massachusetts Executive Council 5th Council District

11th Mayor of Lynn, Massachusetts
- In office January 1, 1866 – January 4, 1869
- Preceded by: Peter M. Neal
- Succeeded by: James N. Buffum

Member of the Lynn, Massachusetts Board of Aldermen

Personal details
- Born: January 6, 1823 Medford, Massachusetts
- Died: March 5, 1895 (aged 72)
- Party: Republican
- Spouse(s): Carolyn M. Mudge, June 5, 1844
- Children: Caroline A. Usher; Abbott L. Usher; Edward P. Usher; Caroline M. Usher

Military service
- Allegiance: United States of America; Union
- Branch/service: Union Army
- Battles/wars: American Civil War

Roland Greene Usher (January 6, 1823 – March 5, 1895) was a Massachusetts politician who served as the 11th Mayor of Lynn, Massachusetts.

== Early life ==
Usher was born on January 6, 1823 to Eleazer and Fanny (Bucknan) Usher in Medford, Massachusetts.

== Family life ==
Usher married Carolyn M. Mudge on June 5, 1844, they had four children, Caroline A. Usher; Abbott L. Usher; Edward P. Usher; Caroline M. Usher. Roland G. Usher, Junior (1880-1957) was his grandson, son of Edward P. Usher.

== Civil War service ==
During the American Civil War, Usher was Paymaster-in-Chief of the Department of the Gulf.

== Warden of the Massachusetts State Prison ==
In 1883 Usher was appointed warden of the Massachusetts state prison by Governor Butler, Usher served as warden until 1886.

== Notes ==
Political offices
Preceded by Peter M. Neal	11th Mayor of Lynn, Massachusetts; January 1, 1866 to January 4, 1869	Succeeded by James N. Buffum
