= Charles E. Harwood =

American politician (1851–1924)

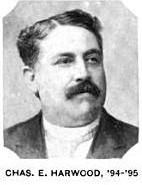

26th Mayor of Lynn, Massachusetts
- In office 1894–1895
- Preceded by: Elihu B. Hayes
- Succeeded by: Eugene A. Besson

Personal details
- Born: March 6, 1851 Charlestown, Massachusetts
- Died: April 7, 1924 (aged 73) York, Maine
- Party: Republican
- Spouse: Nellie I. Blaisdell

Charles E. Harwood (March 6, 1851 – April 7, 1924) was an American politician who served as the 26th Mayor of Lynn, Massachusetts. Harwood as born in Charlestown, Massachusetts to Jesse Harwood and Mary Ann (Lidston) Harwood on March 6, 1851. His family soon moved to Lynn and he was educated in the city's public schools. At the age of 18, Harwood entered into the leather business. His factory was destroyed during the 1889 Lynn fire.

Harwood first won a public office in 1879 when he was elected to the Lynn Common Council.

== 1898 Congressional Race ==
In 1898, Harwood sought the Republican nomination of the Massachusetts's 7th congressional district, losing to future Congressman Ernest W. Roberts.

Political offices
| Preceded by Elihu B. Hayes | Mayor of Lynn, Massachusetts; 1894 to 1895 | Succeeded by Eugene A. Besson |
