= Arthur J. Frawley =

American politician (c. 1899–1969)

44th Mayor of Lynn, Massachusetts
- In office 1952–1955
- Preceded by: Stuart A. Tarr
- Succeeded by: Thomas P. Costin, Jr.

41st Mayor of Lynn, Massachusetts
- In office 1943–1945
- Preceded by: Albert Cole
- Succeeded by: Albert Cole

Personal details
- Born: c. 1899
- Died: November 1969 (aged 70)
- Spouse: Lillian (Feeney) Frawley
- Children: 2

Arthur J. Frawley (c. 1899 – November 1969) was a Massachusetts politician who served as the 41st and 44th mayor of Lynn, Massachusetts.

Frawley was President of the Lynn City Council when he was named Interim Mayor of Lynn following Albert Cole's resignation. Frawley was elected mayor in 1944, but lost his bid for reelection to Cole, who was still serving in the Pacific at the time of his victory.

== Notes ==
Political offices
Preceded by Albert Cole	Mayor of Lynn, Massachusetts; 1943 to 1945	Succeeded by Albert Cole
Preceded by Stuart A. Tarr	Mayor of Lynn, Massachusetts; 1952 to 1955	Succeeded by Thomas P. Costin, Jr.
