= John R. Baldwin =

American politician

John Richard Baldwin
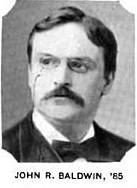

20th Mayor of Lynn, Massachusetts
- In office January 5, 1885 – January 4, 1886
- Preceded by: William L. Baird
- Succeeded by: George D. Hart

Member of the Massachusetts State Senate for the First Essex District,
- In office 1882–1884
- Preceded by: Harmon Hall
- Succeeded by: Josiah C. Bennett

Chairman of the Lynn, Massachusetts School Committee
- In office 1880–1882

Member of the Lynn, Massachusetts School Committee
- In office 1880–1886

Personal details
- Born: May 10, 1854 Lynn, Massachusetts
- Died: May 1, 1897 (aged 42) Lynn, Massachusetts
- Spouse(s): Elizabeth A. Merritt, m. December 27, 1883
- Children: Ellen Elizabeth Baldwin, b. December 2, 1884; Esther Merritt Baldwin, b. August 12, 1886; Mary Converse Baldwin, b. November 15, 1887; John R. Jr., d. 5/1889; Richard Burrill Baldwin, b. July 11, 1891.
- Education: Harvard
- Profession: Attorney

John Richard Baldwin (May 10, 1854 – May 1, 1897) was a Massachusetts politician who served in the Massachusetts State Senate and as the 20th Mayor of Lynn, Massachusetts.

== Early life and career ==
Baldwin was born in Lynn, Massachusetts on May 10, 1854. Baldwin attended the Lynn public schools and Harvard College graduating in 1877. Baldwin was admitted as to the Massachusetts Bar in 1880. From 1880 on Baldwin practiced law in Lynn, first under the firm name of Baldwin & Baker, and, after dissolving that partnership in 1885, he worked as a solo legal practitioner.

On December 27, 1883, Baldwin married Elizabeth A. Merritt, the couple had three daughters Helen Elizabeth Baldwin, Esther Merritt Baldwin, and Mary Converse Baldwin; and two sons, John R. Baldwin, Jr., and Richard Burrill Baldwin.

== Public service ==
In 1879 Baldwin was elected to the Lynn School Committee, and he was re-elected in 1882. Baldwin served on the School Committee for six years and was its chairman from 1881 to 1882.

== Notes ==
Political offices
Preceded by William L. Baird	Mayor of Lynn, Massachusetts; January 5, 1885 to January 4, 1886	Succeeded by George D. Hart
