= Walter H. Creamer =

American politician

36th Mayor of Lynn, Massachusetts
- In office 1918–1921
- Preceded by: George H. Newhall
- Succeeded by: Harland A. McPhetres

Personal details
- Born: October 18, 1860 Salem, Massachusetts, U.S.
- Died: February 3, 1937 (aged 76) Nahant, Massachusetts, U.S.
- Party: Democratic

Walter H. Creamer (October 18, 1860 – February 3, 1937) was an American politician who served as the mayor of Lynn, Massachusetts.

== Life ==
Walter H. Creamer was born on October 18, 1860, in Salem, Massachusetts. He first married Rose Farndale who died in 1921 then on March 7, 1930, he married Margaret Gibbons in Miami, Florida. In the 1880s he became a shoe manufactured in Lynn then moved to Kansas before managing a shoe company in Bethel, Vermont.

Creamer served as a Democratic delegate to multiple national conventions from Vermont and Massachusetts. During the 1912 presidential election he served as one of Massachusetts' eighteen Democratic presidential electors.

In 1916 the Massachusetts legislature and electorate approved a calling of a Constitutional Convention. In May 1917, Creamer was elected to serve as a member of the Massachusetts Constitutional Convention of 1917, representing the Massachusetts Seventh Congressional District.

Following the charting of Lynn, Massachusetts as a city in 1918 Creamer was elected as mayor in 1918 and was reelected in 1920. In 1919 he threatened to fire any police officer to join a union. In 1921 he initially won the mayoral election by a fifty eight vote plurality, but following a recount Harland A. McPhetres defeated him by over one hundred votes.

He died on February 3, 1937, in Nahant, Massachusetts at age 76.

Political offices
Preceded by George H. Newhall	Mayor of Lynn, Massachusetts; 1918 to 1921	Succeeded by Harland A. McPhetres
