= George H. Newhall =

American politician

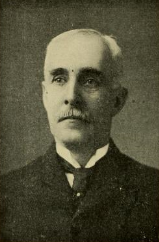

35th Mayor of Lynn, Massachusetts
- In office 1913–1917
- Preceded by: William P. Connery, Sr.
- Succeeded by: Walter H. Creamer

Member of the Massachusetts House of Representatives 12th Essex District
- In office 1906–1908
- Succeeded by: Martin L. Quinn

Member of the Massachusetts House of Representatives 17th Essex District
- In office 1894–1895

Personal details
- Born: October 24, 1850 Lynn, Massachusetts, US
- Died: November 4, 1923 (aged 73) Lynn, Massachusetts, US
- Party: Republican

George H. Newhall (October 24, 1850 – November 4, 1923) was a Massachusetts politician who served in the Massachusetts House of Representatives, as a member of the Board of Aldermen and a member and President of the Common Council of Lynn, Massachusetts, and as the 35th Mayor of Lynn.

== Biography ==
Newhall was born in Lynn, Massachusetts on October 24, 1850. He attended Wilbraham Wesleyan Academy in Wilbraham, Massachusetts.

He died at his home in Lynn on November 4, 1923.

== Business career ==
Newhall was involved in the manufacture of shoes. He later became involved in the real estate and insurance business. He was also the President of the Lynn City Street Railway Company.

== Political career ==
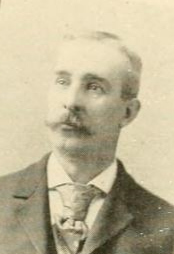
Newhall in 1894

Newhall was a member of the Lynn Common Council from 1886 to 1887, he was the President of the Common Council in 1887. From 1889 to 1890 and again from 1904 to 1905 he was a member of the Lynn Board of Aldermen.

From 1913 to 1917 Newhall was the Mayor of Lynn, Massachusetts.

== See also ==
- 1919 Massachusetts legislature
- 1921–1922 Massachusetts legislature

== Notes ==
Political offices
Preceded by William P. Connery, Sr.	Mayor of Lynn, Massachusetts; 1913 to 1917	Succeeded by Walter H. Creamer
