= Albert Cole (Massachusetts politician) =

American politician

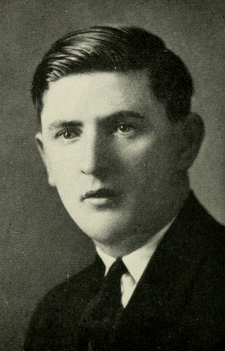
- : Portrait of Albert Cole in the Massachusetts General Court

40th & 42nd Mayor of Lynn, Massachusetts
- In office 1946–1947
- Preceded by: Arthur J. Frawley
- Succeeded by: Stuart A. Tarr
- In office 1940–1943
- Preceded by: J. Fred Manning
- Succeeded by: Arthur J. Frawley

Member of the Massachusetts Senate from the 1st Essex District
- In office 1935–1940
- Preceded by: William F. Shanahan
- Succeeded by: Charles V. Hogan

Personal details
- Born: December 28, 1904 Lynn, Massachusetts, US
- Died: November 14, 1966 (aged 61) Lynn, Massachusetts, US
- Party: Republican
- Education: Suffolk Law School
- Occupation: Lawyer, Politician

Albert Cole (December 28, 1904 – November 14, 1966) was a Massachusetts politician who served in the Massachusetts State Senate and as the 40th and 42nd mayor of Lynn, Massachusetts.

Cole was a Lynn Councillor-at-large from 1932 to 1935 and a member of the Massachusetts Senate from the 1st Essex Senatorial District from 1935 to 1940. Cole was elected Mayor of Lynn in 1939. He stepped down in 1943 to serve with the United States Army in World War II, he was succeeded in the last six months of his term by Councilor-at-large Arthur J. Frawley. He served on the staff of General Douglas MacArthur and was counsel during war crimes trials in Manila. He discharged the rank of Major. He was elected mayor again in 1945 while still serving in the Pacific. During his second tenure as mayor, Cole arranged for the construction of Lynn Memorial City Hall and Auditorium. He did not run for reelection in 1947 and instead supported the campaign of city councilor Stuart A. Tarr.

Cole was a candidate for Lieutenant Governor of Massachusetts in 1946, but lost the Republican nomination to Arthur W. Coolidge.

In 1953, Cole was nominated by President Dwight Eisenhower for the position of Comptroller of Customs in Boston.

Cole died on November 14, 1966, in Lynn following a long illness. He was survived by his wife and two sons.

== See also ==
- Massachusetts legislature: 1935–1936, 1937–1938, 1939

Political offices
Preceded by J. Fred Manning	Mayor of Lynn, Massachusetts; 1940 to 1943	Succeeded by Arthur J. Frawley
Preceded by Arthur J. Frawley	Mayor of Lynn, Massachusetts; 1946 to 1947	Succeeded by Stuart A. Tarr
