= J. Warren Cassidy =

American politician (1930–2024)

48th Mayor of Lynn, Massachusetts
- In office 1970–1972
- Preceded by: Irving E. Kane
- Succeeded by: Pasquale Caggiano

Personal details
- Born: September 28, 1930 Lynn, Massachusetts, U.S.
- Died: June 12, 2024 (aged 93) Mirror Lake, New Hampshire, U.S.
- Party: Democratic (before 1978); Republican (since 1978)
- Spouse: Joan Purtell (m. 1953)
- Children: 5
- Education: Dartmouth College
- Occupation: Insurance executive Mayor; Lobbyist

Joseph Warren Cassidy (September 28, 1930 – June 12, 2024) was an American politician and lobbyist who was executive vice president of the National Rifle Association of America from 1986 to 1991 and Mayor of Lynn, Massachusetts, from 1970 to 1972.

== Early life ==
Born on September 28, 1930 in Lynn, Cassidy attended the Brewster Academy and Dartmouth College. He was an outfielder on the Dartmouth Big Green baseball team. After graduating from Dartmouth in 1953, Cassidy attended the Officer Candidates School at Marine Corps Base Quantico. He served in the United States Marine Corps Reserve and retired with the rank of lieutenant colonel.

From 1955 to 1956, Cassidy was a salesman with the Scott Paper Company. He then served as president of his family's insurance business.

== Mayoralty ==
In 1969, Cassidy was one of six candidates who sought to replace retiring Lynn mayor Irving E. Kane. He and Pasquale Caggiano received the most votes in the nonpartisan primary and advanced to the general election. Although Cassidy had finished 2,600 votes behind Caggiano in the primary, he won the general election by 222 votes after the Internal Revenue Service alleged Caggiano owed $6,660 in back taxes. It was only the third time in 49 years that the leader in the primary election was not elected mayor. In 1971, Cassidy lost his bid for reelection to Caggiano.

== National Rifle Association ==
In 1976, Cassidy was president of the Gun Owners Action League, an alliance of sportsmen's clubs that opposed a Massachusetts referendum that would ban private ownership of handguns. The ballot question was defeated 79% to 21%. In the 1978 Massachusetts gubernatorial election, Cassidy, who had been a Democrat, backed pro-gun Republican Edward F. King. That same year, Cassidy was campaign manager for the Republican nominee in Massachusetts's 6th congressional district – William Bronson.

In 1978, Cassidy was elected to the National Rifle Association's board of directors. In 1982, he replaced Neal Knox as the NRA's chief lobbyist. In 1986, Cassidy succeeded G. Ray Arnett as the organization's executive vice president and chief operating officer. He sought to change the NRA's image as lobbying organization by increasing its safety, hunter education, and shooting competition programs as well as starting a liability insurance program for hunting clubs. In 1987, members who believed Cassidy was too willing to compromise during negotiations on the Firearm Owners Protection Act, backed his unsuccessful challenger for reelection – Neal Knox. In 1991, Cassidy resigned under pressure from the NRA board of directors due to complaints of mismanagement and sexual misconduct.

== Personal life and death ==
Cassidy married Joan Purtell in 1953; they had five children. Cassidy died in Mirror Lake, New Hampshire, at the age of 93.

== Notes ==
Non-profit organization positions
Preceded by G. Ray Arnett	Executive Vice President and Chief Executive Officer of the National Rifle Association of America; 1986 – 1991	Succeeded by Wayne LaPierre
Political offices
Preceded by Irving E. Kane	Mayor of Lynn, Massachusetts; 1970–1972	Succeeded by Pasquale Caggiano
