= Roland G. Usher (historian) =

Roland G. Usher (3 May 1880 in Lynn, Massachusetts – 21 March 1957 in St. Louis, Missouri was a professor of history active in the twentieth century. He had gained his doctorate and been appointed Instructor in History at Washington University in St. Louis by 1910. By 1915, Usher was appointed professor of history at Washington University.

Roland was named after his grandfather Roland G. Usher. His father was Edward Preston Usher and his mother, Adela Louise Payson. On 9 June 1910, he married Florence Wyman Richardson, with whom he had at least four children. Roland G. Usher, Junior was one of these sons, who was also a historian.

== Selected publications ==
- 1905 The Presbyterian movement in the reign of Queen Elizabeth as illustrated by the Minute book of the Dedham classis, 1582-1589
- 1913 Pan-Germanism
- 1914 Pan-Germanism, from its inception to the outbreak of the war, a critical study
- 1943 The Civil Administration of the British Navy During the American Revolution

In addition to his academic publications he also contributed to The Atlantic
