= Henry B. Lovering =

American politician

Henry Bacon Lovering
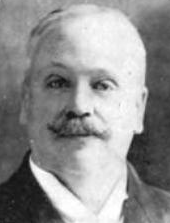

Member of the U.S. House of Representatives from Massachusetts's 6th district
- In office March 4, 1883 – March 3, 1887
- Preceded by: Eben F. Stone
- Succeeded by: Henry Cabot Lodge

18th Mayor of Lynn, Massachusetts
- In office January 3, 1881 – January 1, 1883
- Preceded by: George P. Sanderson
- Succeeded by: William L. Baird

Member of the Massachusetts House of Representatives
- In office 1872; 1874

Personal details
- Born: April 8, 1841 Portsmouth, New Hampshire, U.S.
- Died: April 5, 1911 (aged 69) Wakefield, Massachusetts, U.S.
- Resting place: Pine Grove Cemetery
- Party: Democratic
- Spouse: Abby J. Clifford
- Education: Phillips Exeter Academy
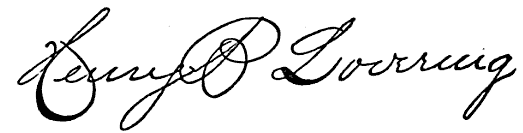
- Signature

Military service
- Allegiance: United States of America; Union
- Branch/service: Union Army
- Unit: Eighth Massachusetts Regiment; Third Massachusetts Cavalry
- Battles/wars: American Civil War: Battle of Winchester

Henry Bacon Lovering (April 8, 1841 – April 5, 1911) was an American politician and U.S. Representative from Massachusetts.

== Early life and education ==
Born in Portsmouth, New Hampshire, Lovering attended the public schools of Lynn, Massachusetts, and was graduated from Phillips Exeter Academy, Exeter, New Hampshire.

During the Civil War; Lovering enlisted in 1862 in the Eighth Regiment, Massachusetts Volunteer Infantry, and served out his term. He reenlisted in the Third Massachusetts Cavalry and served until the Battle of Winchester; where he lost his left leg.

== Political career ==
Lovering served as member of the Massachusetts House of Representatives in 1872 and 1874. He was a member of the Lynn, Massachusetts Board of Assessors in 1879 and 1880. Lovering served as the 18th Mayor of Lynn in 1881 and 1882. He was elected as a Democrat to the Forty-eighth and Forty-ninth Congresses (March 4, 1883 – March 3, 1887). He was an unsuccessful candidate for reelection in 1886 to the Fiftieth Congress. Lovering was Chairmen of the Massachusetts Democratic State Convention of 1886 and the unsuccessful Democratic candidate for Governor of Massachusetts in 1887. In 1888, Lovering was appointed United States Marshal for Massachusetts by President Cleveland, serving until the Republicans returned to power in 1891. Lovering was Warden of the State prison 1891–1893, United States pension agent at Boston 1894–1898, Sealer of weights and measures for the city of Boston, Massachusetts from 1902 to 1905, and Superintendent of the Chardon Street Soldiers' Home at Boston from 1905 to 1907.

== Death and Burial ==
Lovering moved to Wakefield, Massachusetts, in 1907, where he died at the residence of his son on April 5, 1911. Lovering was interred in Pine Grove Cemetery, Lynn, Massachusetts.

== See also ==
- 1872 Massachusetts legislature
- 1874 Massachusetts legislature

== Notes ==
Party political offices
| Preceded by John F. Andrew | Democratic nominee for Governor of Massachusetts; 1887 | Succeeded by William E. Russell |
Political offices
| Preceded by George P. Sanderson | Mayor of Lynn, Massachusetts; January 3, 1881 - January 1, 1883 | Succeeded by William L. Baird |
U.S. House of Representatives
| Preceded by Eben F. Stone | Member of the U.S. House of Representatives from Massachusetts's 6th congressional district March 4, 1883 - March 3, 1887 | Succeeded by Henry Cabot Lodge |
