= Ezra W. Mudge =

American politician

Ezra Warren Mudge
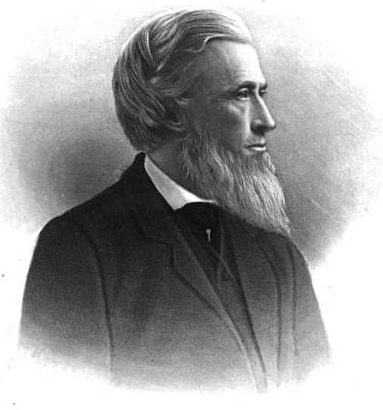

6th Mayor of Lynn, Massachusetts
- In office January 7, 1856 – January 4, 1858
- Preceded by: Andrews Breed
- Succeeded by: William F. Johnson

Member of the Lynn, Massachusetts Board of Aldermen
- In office 1862–1864

Member of the Lynn, Massachusetts Board of Selectmen
- In office 1843–1844

Personal details
- Born: December 5, 1811
- Died: September 20, 1878 (aged 66)
- Party: Democratic (until 1896); then Republican
- Spouse: Eliza R. Bray
- Children: Ezra Warren, b. April 18, 1837; William Ropes, b. July 18, 1839; Mary Chadwell, August 13, 1841; Hervey Mackay, October 6, 1843; Howard Murray, December 9, 1845; Florence Howard, November 28, 1850; Arthur Bartlet, December 14, 1853; Benjamin Cushing, February 10, 1856; and Kate Gertrude, June 30, 1857.
- Parent(s): Ezra Mudge and Ruth (Chadwell) Mudge
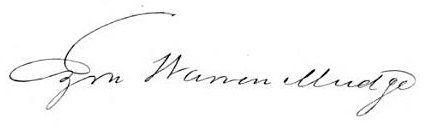
- Signature

Ezra Warren Mudge (December 5, 1811 – September 20, 1878) was a Massachusetts politician who served as the sixth Mayor of Lynn, Massachusetts.

== Notes ==
Political offices
Preceded by Andrews Breed	Mayor of Lynn, Massachusetts; January 7, 1856 to January 4, 1858	Succeeded by William F. Johnson
