= William L. Baird =

American politician

William Lewis Baird
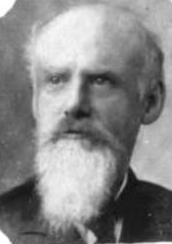

19th Mayor of Lynn, Massachusetts
- In office January 1, 1883 – January 5, 1885
- Preceded by: Henry B. Lovering
- Succeeded by: John R. Baldwin

Member of the Lynn, Massachusetts Board of Aldermen

Member of the Lynn, Massachusetts City Council
- In office 1876–1876

Personal details
- Born: July 29, 1843 Lynn, Massachusetts, US
- Died: July 7, 1916 (aged 73) Richmond, New Hampshire, US
- Party: Republican
- Spouse(s): 1.) Esther E. Hathaway, m. May 221, 1867. d. February 25, 1874; 2.) Clara L. Collins, m. October 11, 1881
- Parent(s): William Baird, Mary Ellen (Russell) Baird;

Military service
- Allegiance: United States of America; Union
- Branch/service: United States Army; Union Army
- Rank: Private, Sergeant, Lieutenant
- Unit: Company I 8th Massachusetts Volunteer Infantry; Company I Fourth Massachusetts Heavy Artillery
- Battles/wars: American Civil War

William Lewis Baird (July 29, 1843 – July 7, 1916) was a Massachusetts politician who served as the 19th Mayor of Lynn, Massachusetts.

== Notes ==
Political offices
Preceded by Henry B. Lovering	19th Mayor of Lynn, Massachusetts; January 1, 1883 to January 5, 1885	Succeeded by John R. Baldwin
