= E. Knowlton Fogg =

American politician

Ebenezer Knowlton Fogg
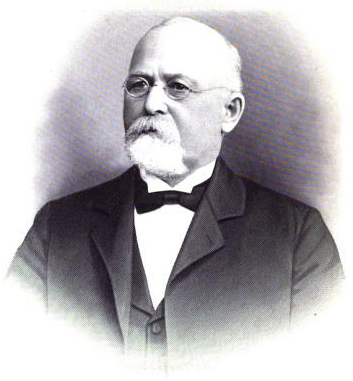

24th Mayor of Lynn, Massachusetts
- In office January 5, 1891 – January 4, 1892
- Preceded by: Asa T. Newhall
- Succeeded by: Elihu B. Hayes

Member of the Massachusetts House of Representatives Seventeenth Essex District
- In office 1896–1897

City of Lynn Common Council Representing Ward 3
- In office 1888–1889

City of Lynn Board of Aldermen
- In office 1889 – January 5, 1891

City of Lynn Chairman of the Board of Aldermen
- In office January 1890 – January 5, 1891
- Preceded by: William W. Hay
- Succeeded by: John R. Story

Personal details
- Born: October 24, 1837 Norwood, Massachusetts, U.S.
- Died: April 21, 1900 (aged 62) Lynn, Massachusetts, U.S.
- Party: Republican
- Spouse: Francena S. Batchelder
- Children: 2
- Profession: Shoemaker, retail shoe salesman
- Signature from: Newhall, James Robinson.: History of Lynn Essex County, Massachusetts; Including Lynnfield, Saugus, Swampscot, and Nahant: Massachusetts, Vol. II (1897) p. 377.

Ebenezer Knowlton Fogg (October 24, 1837 – April 21, 1900) was an American shoe retailer and politician, who served as a member of the Massachusetts House of Representatives, and as a member of the Common Council, Board of Aldermen and as the 24th Mayor of Lynn, Massachusetts.

== Early life ==
Fogg was born on October 24, 1837, in Norwood, Massachusetts, to Jeremiah Fogg and Abigail (Hill) Fogg.

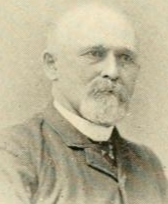
Fogg as a Massachusetts State Representative in 1896

== Postmaster of Lynn ==
Fogg was the Postmaster of Lynn, Massachusetts from June 1, 1898, until his death on April 21, 1900.

== Bibliography ==
- Cutter, William Richard.: Genealogical and Personal Memoirs Relating to the Families of Boston and Eastern Massachusetts, Vol. II (1908), pp. 1037-1038.
- Arrington, Benjamin F.: Municipal History of Essex County in Massachusetts: A Classified Work, Devoted to the County's Remarkable Growth in All Lines of Human Endeavor; More Especially to Within a Period of Fifty Years (1922) p. 402.
- Newhall, James Robinson.: History of Lynn Essex County, Massachusetts; Including Lynnfield, Saugus, Swampscot, and Nahant: Massachusetts Including Lynnfield, Saugus, Swampscot, and Nahant Vol. II 1864 -1893. (1897) pp 354, 362.

Political offices
Preceded by Asa T. Newhall	Mayor of Lynn, Massachusetts; January 5, 1891 to January 4, 1892	Succeeded by Elihu B. Hayes
