= Robert S. Maloney =

American politician (1881–1934)

Robert Sarsfield Maloney
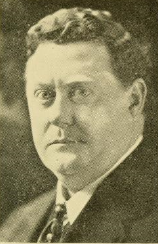

Member of the U.S. House of Representatives from Massachusetts's 7th district
- In office March 4, 1921 – March 3, 1923
- Preceded by: Michael F. Phelan
- Succeeded by: William P. Connery Jr.

Member of the Lawrence, Massachusetts City Commission
- In office 1916–1920

President of the Lawrence, Massachusetts Board of Aldermen

Member of the Lawrence, Massachusetts Board of Aldermen
- In office 1909–1909

Personal details
- Born: February 3, 1881 Lawrence, Massachusetts, U.S.
- Died: November 8, 1934 (aged 53) Lawrence, Massachusetts, U.S.
- Resting place: Immaculate Conception Cemetery
- Party: Republican

Robert Sarsfield Maloney (February 3, 1881 – November 8, 1934) was a United States representative from Massachusetts.

== Early life and education ==
Maloney was born in Lawrence, Massachusetts. He attended public schools and learned the printer's trade.

== Trade Union activities ==
Maloney was a fraternal delegate of the American Federation of Labor to the 1907 Canadian Trades and Labor Congress in Winnipeg, Manitoba. He was New England organizer for the International Typographical Union 1908–1912.

== Lawrence Board of Aldermen ==
He was elected a member of the Lawrence, Massachusetts Board of Aldermen in 1909 and he served as the Board's president.

== City commissioner for Public health ==
In the November 7, 1911 city election the voters enacted a new city charter that enacted a City Commission form of government in Lawrence. The new charter took effect on January 1, 1912. Maloney was member of the city commission in 1912, and from 1916 to 1920 and served as president. Maloney was elected to the city commission to serve as the director of the Department of Public Health and Charities, Maoney served in this capacity in 1912 and 1915–1920.

== Congressional service ==
Maloney was elected as a Republican to the Sixty-seventh Congress from (March 4, 1921 – March 3, 1923), but was not a candidate for renomination. As of 2023, he was the last Republican to represent the 7th congressional district. He again served as director of the Department of Public Health and Charities, from 1924 until 1928, published a weekly newspaper and, later, engaged in the restaurant business until his death.

== Death and Burial ==
Maloney died in Lawrence on November 8, 1934. His interment was in Lawrence's Immaculate Conception Cemetery.

== Sources ==
- United States Congress. "Robert S. Maloney (id: M000092)". Biographical Directory of the United States Congress.

U.S. House of Representatives
Preceded by Michael Francis Phelan	Member of the U.S. House of Representatives from Massachusetts's 7th congressional district March 4, 1921 – March 3, 1923	Succeeded by William P. Connery, Jr.
