= Elihu B. Hayes =

American politician

Elihu Burritt Hayes
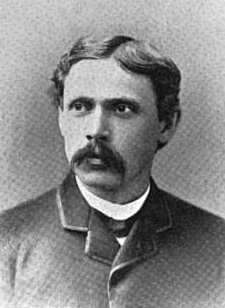

25th Mayor of Lynn, Massachusetts
- In office January 4, 1892 – January 1, 1894
- Preceded by: E. Knowlton Fogg
- Succeeded by: Charles E. Harwood

Member of the Massachusetts House of Representatives 18th Essex District

Member of the Lynn, Massachusetts Board of Aldermen
- In office 1883–1883

Personal details
- Born: April 26, 1848 West Lebanon, Maine, US
- Died: April 1, 1903 (aged 54) Lynn, Massachusetts, US
- Party: Republican
- Spouse(s): Amy A. Farnum, m. 1873.
- Children: Eugene
- Profession: Shoemaker, Newspaperman
- Signature from: Newhall, James Robinson.: History of Lynn Essex County, Massachusetts; Including Lynnfield, Saugus, Swampscot, and Nahant: Massachusetts Including Lynnfield, Saugus, Swampscot, and Nahant Vol. 2 (1897) p. 377.

Elihu Burritt Hayes (April 26, 1848 – April 1, 1903) was an American shoe manufacturer, newspaperman, and politician, who served as a member of the Massachusetts House of Representatives, representing the 18th Essex District, and as the 25th Mayor of Lynn, Massachusetts.

== Early life ==
Hayes was born in West Lebanon, Maine, on April 26, 1848, and moved to Lynn, Massachusetts in 1865.

== Family life ==
In 1873 Hayes married Amy A. Farnum of Lynn, They had one child, Eugene.

== Business career ==
Hayes worked in the shoe industry, indeed he may have been employed by the Hayes Cooperage Co. which was founded by John and Patrick Hayes in mid 1800s, until 1872. After he left the shoe industry, Hayes went into the newspaper business. Hayes took over ownership of The Lynn Bee. In 1885 Hayes took over The Boston Advertiser.

== Introduction of the secret ballot in Massachusetts ==
In 1888, while in the Massachusetts Legislature, Hayes introduced the first bill in the United States to adopt the Australian style ballot system, initiating the successful movement for the adoption of the Secret ballot in the United States.

== Bibliography ==
- Arrington, Benjamin F.: Municipal History of Essex County in Massachusetts: A Classified Work, Devoted to the County's Remarkable Growth in All Lines of Human Endeavor; More Especially to Within a Period of Fifty Years (1922) p. 402.
- Boston Daily Globe (November 6, 1889), Slick Work in Lynn. Elihu B. Hayes, Local Father of the System, Pleased., Boston, MA: Boston Daily Globe, (1889) p. 8.
- Boston Daily Globe (April 2, 1903), Hon. Elihu B. Hayes Dead Prominent Resident of Lynn Well Known to New England. He Had Never Completely Recovered from the Effects of Fall Down Stairs in His Home Last October. Born a Poor Boy. In Newspaper Work. In Municipal Affairs. Candidate for Congress. Spanish War Relief Work. Fond of His Home., Boston, Mass: Boston Daily Globe, (1903) p. 14.
- The New York Times (April 2, 1903) Death List of A Day.; Elihu Burritt Hayes, (1903), p. 9.
- Newhall, James Robinson.: History of Lynn Essex County, Massachusetts; Including Lynnfield, Saugus, Swampscot, and Nahant: Massachusetts Including Lynnfield, Saugus, Swampscot, and Nahant Vol. II 1864 -1893. (1897) p. 362.
- Wigmore, John Henry.; (October, 1889), The Australian Ballot System as Embodied in the Legislation of Various Countries: With an Historical Introduction, and an Appendix of Decisions Since 1856 in Great Britain, Ireland, Canada, and Australia, Boston, MA: The Boston Book Company, (1889) p. 27.

Political offices
Preceded by E. Knowlton Fogg	25th Mayor of Lynn, Massachusetts; January 4, 1892 to January 1, 1894	Succeeded by Charles E. Harwood
