= Eugene A. Bessom =

American politician

Eugene Angier Bessom
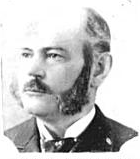

27th Mayor of Lynn, Massachusetts
- In office 1896–1896
- Preceded by: Charles E. Harwood
- Succeeded by: Walter L. Ramsdell

Member of the Massachusetts State Senate 1st Essex District
- In office 1894–1895
- Preceded by: Charles H. Baker
- Succeeded by: Lewis H. Bartlett

Member of the Massachusetts House of Representatives 17th Essex District

Personal details
- Born: June 11, 1855 Lynn, Massachusetts, US
- Died: June 1913
- Resting place: Pine Grove Cemetery
- Party: Republican
- Education: Massachusetts College of Pharmacy
- Occupation: Pharmacist

Eugene Angier Bessom (June 11, 1855–June 19, 1913) was an American pharmacist and politician who served in both branches of the Massachusetts legislature, and as the 27th Mayor of Lynn, Massachusetts.

Bessom was born on June 11, 1855 in Lynn.

Political offices
| Preceded by Charles E. Harwood | Mayor of Lynn, Massachusetts; 1896 to 1896 | Succeeded by Walter L. Ramsdell |
| Preceded by Charles H. Baker | Member of the Massachusetts State Senate; 1st Essex District; 1894 to 1895 | Succeeded by Lewis H. Bartlett |

== See also ==
- 116th Massachusetts General Court (1895)
