= Pasquale Caggiano =

American politician (1909–1972)

49th Mayor of Lynn, Massachusetts
- In office January 1972 – April 1972
- Preceded by: J. Warren Cassidy
- Succeeded by: Walter F. Meserve

Member of the Massachusetts House of Representatives 12th Essex District
- In office 1953–1957
- Preceded by: Walter A. Cuffe
- Succeeded by: George J. O'Shea, Jr.

Member of the Lynn Massachusetts City Council At Large
- In office 1950–1951

Personal details
- Born: August 31, 1909 Boston, Massachusetts
- Died: April 13, 1972 (aged 62)
- Party: Democrat
- Spouse: Olga A. (Foglietta) Caggiano
- Occupation: Undertaker
- Nickname: Patsy

Pasquale 'Patsy' Caggiano (August 31, 1909 – April 13, 1972) was a Massachusetts politician who served as a member of the Massachusetts House of Representatives and as an At Large City Councilor and the 49th Mayor of Lynn, Massachusetts.

Caggiano was orphaned as a child. Later he went into the mortuary business, opening up a funeral parlor in Winthrop.

Caggiano served on the Lynn City Council from 1950 to 1951. From 1952 to 1957 he was a member of the Massachusetts House of Representatives. In 1956 he ran for United States House of Representatives seat in Massachusetts's 7th congressional district, losing in the Democratic primary. In 1958 Caggiano was appointed associate commissioner of labor and industries by Governor Foster Furcolo.

Caggiano ran for lieutenant governor in 1960 and 1962, but was ruled off of the ballot in 1962 due to 127 "not genuine" signatures. In 1964 he was an unsuccessful candidate for Governor of Massachusetts. In 1968 he lost in the Massachusetts House of Representatives election in the 12th Essex District.

Cagiano was finally elected mayor of Lynn on his seventh attempt, however shortly after he became mayor he died of cancer.

== See also ==
- 1953–1954 Massachusetts legislature
- 1955–1956 Massachusetts legislature

== Notes ==
Political offices
Preceded by J. Warren Cassidy	Mayor of Lynn, Massachusetts; January 1972 to April 1972	Succeeded by Walter F. Meserve
