= Michael Francis Phelan =

American politician

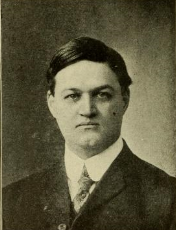

Member of the U.S. House of Representatives from Massachusetts's 7th district
- In office March 4, 1913 – March 3, 1921
- Preceded by: Ernest W. Roberts
- Succeeded by: Robert S. Maloney

Member of the Massachusetts House of Representatives 12th Essex District
- In office 1905–1906
- Preceded by: Asa T. Newhall

Personal details
- Born: October 22, 1875
- Died: October 12, 1941 (aged 65) Boston, Massachusetts, U.S.
- Party: Democratic
- Education: Harvard, Harvard Law School

Michael Francis Phelan (October 22, 1875 – October 12, 1941) was a U.S. representative from Massachusetts.

Born in Lynn, Massachusetts, Phelan attended the public schools. He graduated from Lynn Classical High School, from Harvard College in 1897, and from Harvard Law School in 1900. He was admitted to the bar in 1900 and commenced practice in Lynn.

== Massachusetts House of Representatives ==
=== 1903 State Representative election ===
In 1903 Phelan ran for the office of Massachusetts State Representative, Phelan received 1,307 votes. Asa T. Newhall received 1,371 votes coming in second behind Republican candidate John W. Blaney who received 1,434 votes. The district sent two representatives to the Massachusetts House, so although Newhall came in second in the vote total he was elected.

=== 1904 State Representative election ===
In 1904 Phelan was elected as a Democrat to serve in the Massachusetts House of Representatives of 1905.

== United States House of Representatives ==
=== Election to Congress ===
Phelan was elected as a Democrat to the Sixty-third and to the three succeeding Congresses (March 4, 1913 – March 3, 1921).

=== Congressional Service ===
Phelan served as chairman of the Committee on Banking and Currency (Sixty-fifth Congress). Phelan was an Irish nationalist, who tried to use his position as a congressman to bring attention to Irish nationalism. He was opposed to American entry into World War I on the grounds that he did not want the United States to be on the same side as the United Kingdom in a war. Phelan was "deeply antisemitic," harboring a lifelong bigotry against Jewish people. He lamented the 1916 United States presidential election on the grounds that "both candidates were England-lovers and Jew sympathizers." He believed that both Charles Evans Hughes and Woodrow Wilson were "profanely flawed" because both men were "pro-British" with regard to foreign policy, and because both men were outspokenly opposed to antisemitism. Woodrow Wilson opposed Phelan when Phelan expressed support for limiting Jewish immigration to the United States. Phelan described this as "unforgiveable."

Phelan was an unsuccessful candidate for reelection in 1920 to the Sixty-seventh Congress. Practiced law in Lynn and Boston, Massachusetts, and Washington, D.C.. He served as member of the Merrimac Valley Sewage Commission in 1937. He was appointed a member of the Massachusetts Labor Relations Board in 1937 and served until his death.

== Personal life ==
Phelan was close friends with Massachusetts Governor and Senator David Ignatius Walsh. Near the end of his life representative Phelan was a frequent reader of the periodical Social Justice, published by antisemitic priest Charles Coughlin.

== Death and burial ==
Phelan died in Boston, Massachusetts, October 12, 1941. Phelan was interred in St. Mary's Cemetery, Lynn, Massachusetts.

== Notes ==
U.S. House of Representatives
Preceded by Ernest W. Roberts	Member of the U.S. House of Representatives from Massachusetts's 7th congressional district March 4, 1913 – March 3, 1921	Succeeded by Robert S. Maloney
