= William F. Johnson =

American politician (1819–1898)

William Frederick Johnson
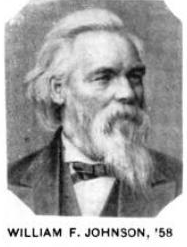

7th Mayor of Lynn, Massachusetts
- In office January 4, 1858 – January 3, 1859
- Preceded by: Ezra W. Mudge
- Succeeded by: Edward S. Davis

Personal details
- Born: July 30, 1819 Nahant, Massachusetts, U.S.
- Died: November 24, 1898 (aged 79) Massachusetts, U.S.

William Frederick Johnson (1819-1898) was a Massachusetts politician who served as the seventh Mayor of Lynn, Massachusetts from 1858-1859.
