= Daniel C. Baker =

American politician (1816–1863)

Daniel Collins Baker
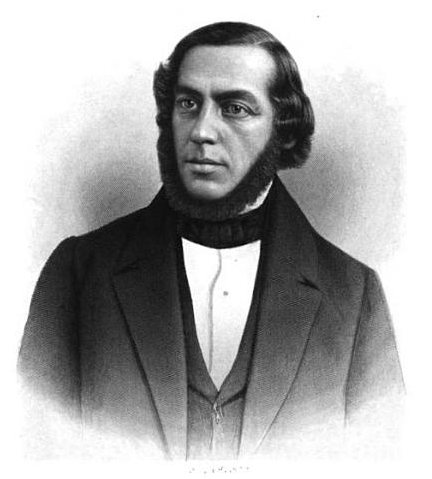

3rd Mayor of Lynn, Massachusetts
- In office April 4, 1853 – April 3, 1854
- Preceded by: Benjamin Franklin Mudge
- Succeeded by: Thomas P. Richardson

First President of the Lynn, Massachusetts Common Council
- In office 1850–1851
- Preceded by: Town Meeting Moderator
- Succeeded by: James R. Newhall

Member of the Massachusetts State Senate
- In office 1849–1850

Personal details
- Born: October 14, 1816
- Died: July 19, 1863 (aged 46) New Orleans, Louisiana
- Spouse(s): Augusta Chase, m. December 19, 1838
- Children: William E. Baker, Helen A. Baker, Sara E. Baker;
- Parent(s): Elisha Baker, Ruth (Collins) Baker

Daniel Collins Baker (October 14, 1816 – July 19, 1863) was a Massachusetts politician who served as the third Mayor of Lynn, Massachusetts.

Political offices
Preceded by Benjamin F. Mudge	Mayor of Lynn, Massachusetts; April 4, 1853 to April 3, 1854	Succeeded by Thomas P. Richardson
