= Charles Neal Barney =

American mayor (1875–1949)

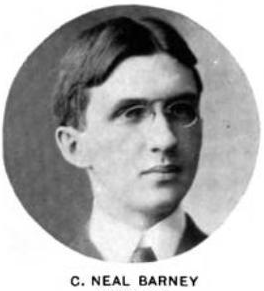

31st Mayor of Lynn, Massachusetts
- In office 1906–1907
- Preceded by: Henry W. Eastham
- Succeeded by: Thomas F. Porter

President of the Lynn, Massachusetts Common Council
- In office 1901–1901
- Preceded by: Henry W. Eastham
- Succeeded by: William A. Willey

Member of the Lynn, Massachusetts Common Council Ward Four
- In office 1901–1904

Personal details
- Born: June 27, 1875
- Died: April 24, 1949
- Party: Republican
- Spouse: Maizie Blaikie
- Education: Tufts College, Boston University School of Law

Charles Neal Barney (June 27, 1875 – April 24, 1949) was a Massachusetts politician who served as a member of the Common Council and as the 31st Mayor of Lynn, Massachusetts.

== Biography ==
Barney was born in Lynn, Massachusetts, on June 27, 1875, to William M. Barney and Mary L. Neal. He was the grandson of Lynn's tenth mayor Peter Morrell Neal.

Barney graduated from Tufts College receiving his A.B. in 1895 and his A.M., in 1909. While at Tufts Barney joined Theta Delta Chi. Barney received his law degree (LL.B.) from Boston University School of Law in 1898. In 1900, he formed a partnership with Henry T. Lummus.

Barney married Maizie Blaikie in Malden, Massachusetts, on June 27, 1901.

From 1908 to 1918 Barney taught Equity at Northeastern University School of Law.

Barney was a member of the Lynn Common Council from 1901 to 1904, mayor of Lynn from 1906 to 1907, and a Presidential Elector in 1908.

In 1918 Barney went to work as the chief counsel and secretary for the New Jersey–based Worthington Pump and Machinery Corporation. In 1942 Barney was elected as the Worthington Pump and Machinery Corporation's vice-president and secretary.

Barney, who was a great nephew of Maria Mitchell, and from 1947 to 1949 served as a president of the Maria Mitchell Association.

He died on April 24, 1949.

Political offices
Preceded by Henry W. Eastham	President of the Lynn, Massachusetts; Common Council; 1901-1901	Succeeded by William A. Willey
Preceded by Henry W. Eastham	Mayor of Lynn, Massachusetts; 1906 to 1907	Succeeded by Thomas F. Porter
