= William Shepherd (Massachusetts politician) =

American politician

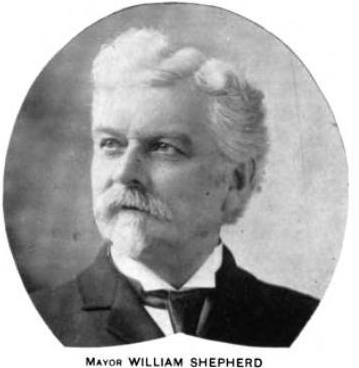

29th Mayor of Lynn, Massachusetts
- In office 1899–1902
- Preceded by: Walter L. Ramsdell
- Succeeded by: Henry W. Eastham

Member of the Massachusetts House of Representatives 20th Essex District
- In office 1895–1896
- Preceded by: Ottho W. Lewis
- Succeeded by: Ottho W. Lewis (District re numbered to 14th Essex)

Member of the Lynn, Massachusetts Common Council Ward 3
- In office 1870–1870

Personal details
- Born: September 17, 1837 Red Hill, County Cavan, Ireland
- Died: 1907
- Party: Republican
- Education: Mayhew Grammar School, Boston, Massachusetts
- Occupation: Shoe Manufacturer

William Shepherd (September 17, 1837 – 1907) was a Massachusetts politician who served in the Massachusetts House of Representatives and as the 29th Mayor of Lynn, Massachusetts.

== Early life and education ==
Shepherd was born in Red Hill, County Cavan, Ireland on September 17, 1837. Shepherd moved to the United States when he was 9 years old. He was educated in the Boston Public Schools, graduating from the Mayhew grammar school.

== Business career ==
Shepherd moved to Lynn in 1857 where he learned the trade of shoe making. Shepherd went into the business of shoe manufacturing with his brother Alan G. Shepherd. Shepherd later worked for other manufactures as a foreman.

== Community involvement ==
Shepherd was a member of the Fire Department and a member of he represented Ward 3 on the Lynn Common Council.

== Massachusetts House of Representatives ==
Shepherd was elected to serve in the Massachusetts House of Representatives of 1895 and 1896, representing the 20th Essex district, which was made up out of Wards 6 and 7 of Lynn and the Town of Saugus. In the House Shepherd served on the Committee on Public and Charitable Institutions.

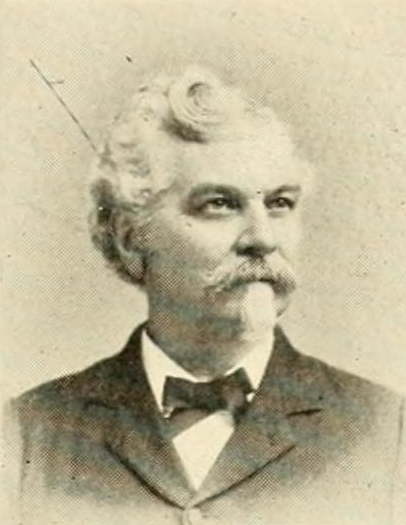
Portrait of William Shepherd when he was a Massachusetts State Representative in 1896

== Mayor of Lynn ==
Shepherd served as the Mayor of Lynn, Massachusetts from 1899 to 1902.

Political offices
Preceded by Walter L. Ramsdell	Mayor of Lynn, Massachusetts; 1899 - 1902	Succeeded by Henry W. Eastham
Preceded by Ottho W. Lewis	Member of the Massachusetts House of Representatives; 20th Essex District; 1895 - 1896	Succeeded by Ottho W. Lewis
Preceded by	Member of the Lynn, Massachusetts Common Council; Ward 3; 1870 - 1870	Succeeded by
