= George Plaisted Sanderson =

American politician (1836–1915)

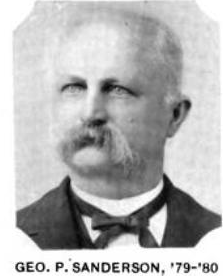

17th Mayor of Lynn, Massachusetts
- In office January 6, 1879 – January 3, 1881
- Preceded by: Samuel M. Bubier
- Succeeded by: Henry B. Lovering

Personal details
- Born: November 22, 1836 Gardiner, Maine
- Died: June 10, 1915 (aged 78) Lynn, Massachusetts
- Party: Greenback
- Spouse(s): Julia A. Mills, m. July 3, 1859
- Occupation: Shoe Manufacturer

Military service
- Allegiance: United States of America; Union
- Branch/service: Union Army
- Unit: 36th Regiment; Massachusetts Volunteers
- Battles/wars: American Civil War

George Plaisted Sanderson (November 22, 1836 – June 10, 1915) was a Massachusetts politician who served as the 17th Mayor of Lynn, Massachusetts. Sanderson was born in Gardiner, Maine to Aaron Sanderson He died in 1915.

== Notes ==
Political offices
Preceded by Samuel M. Bubier	17th Mayor of Lynn, Massachusetts; January 6, 1879 to January 3, 1881	Succeeded by Henry B. Lovering
