= Benjamin Franklin Mudge =

American lawyer and geologist (1817–1879)

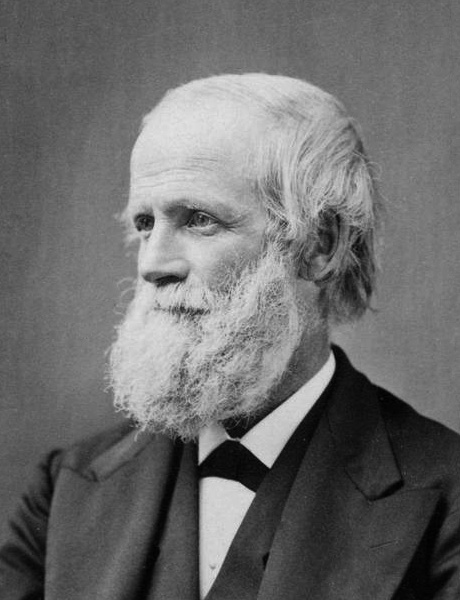

2nd Mayor of Lynn, Massachusetts
- In office June 16, 1852 – April 4, 1853
- Preceded by: George Hood
- Succeeded by: Daniel C. Baker

Personal details
- Born: August 11, 1817 Orrington, Maine, US
- Died: November 21, 1879 (aged 62) Manhattan, Kansas, US
- Spouse: Mary E. Beckford
- Occupation: Geologist, paleontologist, teacher, lawyer, chemist

Benjamin Franklin Mudge (August 11, 1817 – November 21, 1879) was an American lawyer, geologist and teacher. Briefly the mayor of Lynn, Massachusetts, he later moved to Kansas where he was appointed the first State Geologist. He led the first geological survey of the state in 1864, and published the first book on the geology of Kansas. He lectured extensively, and was department chair at the Kansas State Agricultural College (KSAC, now Kansas State University).

He also avidly collected fossils, and was one of the first to systematically explore the Permian and Mesozoic biota in the geologic formations of Kansas and the American West, including the Niobrara Chalk, the Morrison Formation, and the Dakota Sandstone. While not formally trained in paleontology, he kept extensive and accurate field notes and sent most of his fossils East to be described by some of the most noted paleontologists of his time, including the rivals Othniel Charles Marsh and Edward Drinker Cope.

His discoveries included at least 80 new species of extinct animals and plants, which are found in the collections of some of the most prestigious U.S. institutions of natural history, including the Smithsonian and Yale's Peabody Museum of Natural History. One of his most notable finds is the holotype of the first recognized "bird with teeth", Ichthyornis. While working for Marsh, he also discovered the type species of the sauropod dinosaur Diplodocus, and the theropod dinosaur Allosaurus, with his protégé Samuel Wendell Williston.

== Biography ==
=== Early life ===
Mudge was born in Orrington, Maine to James and Ruth Mudge on August 11, 1817, and moved with his family to Lynn, Massachusetts, in 1818. He helped support three older brothers enrolled in the Methodist Episcopal Conference by working as a shoemaker for 6 years, before attending Wesleyan University. Unlike his brothers who all became clergy, Benjamin studied science and the classics before graduating in 1840. He acquired his Master of Arts several years later from the same institution, and passed the bar and began practicing as a lawyer in 1842. On September 16, 1842, he married Mary E. Beckford; he continued his practice, and was elected mayor of Lynn in 1852 on a temperance platform.

In 1859 he moved to Cloverport, Kentucky, where he briefly worked as a chemist at Breckinridge Coal and Oil Company, a local oil refinery.

=== Educator and state geologist ===
With the start of the American Civil War in 1861, Mudge moved to Quindaro (now part of Kansas City) where he took a job teaching public school in Kansas City. In Quindaro, Mudge and his family operated a waystation of the Underground Railroad, aiding slaves fleeing from Missouri,

He lectured around the state, and in 1864 delivered a series on "Scientific and Economical Geology" to the legislature in Topeka while the bill to establish the first state geological survey was being debated in the House. The Topeka Tribune wrote:

The lectures of Hon. B. F. Mudge are exciting considerable interest, among the members of the legislature, and the people of Topeka. He has spoken three times in Representative Hall, to large audiences whose close attention attests how deeply they are interested in his lectures

After Watson Foster withdrew due to opposition, and George C. Swallow was accused of disloyalty, Mudge was appointed as the stage geologist and the director of the first Kansas Geological Survey by Governor Thomas Carney. He reluctantly accepted, writing the following note at the bottom of the Senate nomination: "This petition was started without my knowledge or consent. I am in favor of the appointment of Prof. W. Foster".

Mudge was responsible for surveying 212,000 km^{2} (82,000 sq mi) of mineral and soil resources by the end of the year, with a budget of US$3,500 and a staff of five. In the 1860s, there were no railroads and very few towns west of Topeka, and the area had seen a resurgence of "Indian trouble". Mudge moved to Manhattan, Kansas, and despite not being able to visit all the areas of the state, he submitted Geology of Kansas by the November 30, 1864, deadline, the first book on the geology of Kansas. The document covered stratigraphy but primarily focused on exploitable economic resources, particularly coal and salt. Mudge resigned at the end of his term, but the position was renewed and Swallow was appointed to head the 1865 survey with a larger budget and staff, and completed a more extensive survey. Due to funding problems, both the 1864 and 1865 reports were not published until 1866. After the two surveys, the Kansas Geologic Survey went into abeyance until 1895, when it was permanently established at the University of Kansas.

After his term as state geologist, Mudge became the chair of Natural Sciences at the Kansas State Agricultural College (KSAC, now Kansas State University) and started teaching in 1865. He left KSAC in 1873 after a dispute with the administration. over back pay.

=== First discoveries ===
Mudge began geological and paleontological field expeditions in 1865, while still employed at KSAC. He collected footprints near Junction City in 1865, and invertebrates and Late Cretaceous deciduous leaves near Ellsworth in 1866, and more plants and a saurian in 1869 from the Republican River near the northern state line. His expedition in 1870 was near Fort Wallace and saw the discovery of numerous plesiosaurs and fish from the Saurodontidae family. 1871 saw plants, molluscs, vertebrates, and the bird Hesperornis from western Kansas. In 1872 more vertebrates and plants were discovered in Smith County, while in 1873 new species were discovered in Trego and Ellis Counties, and plesiosaurs were found in 1874 in Jewell and Gove Counties.

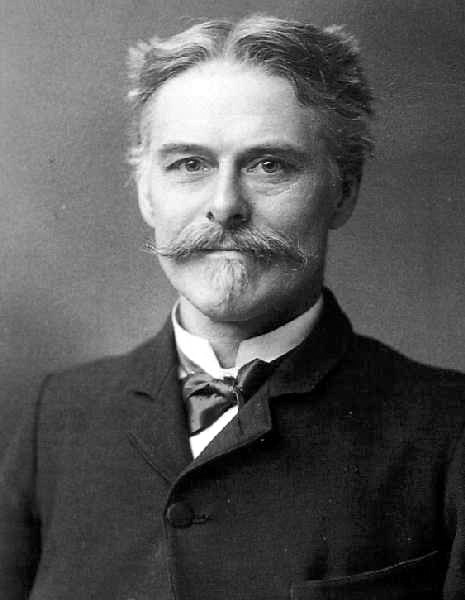
Edward Drinker Cope, ANS

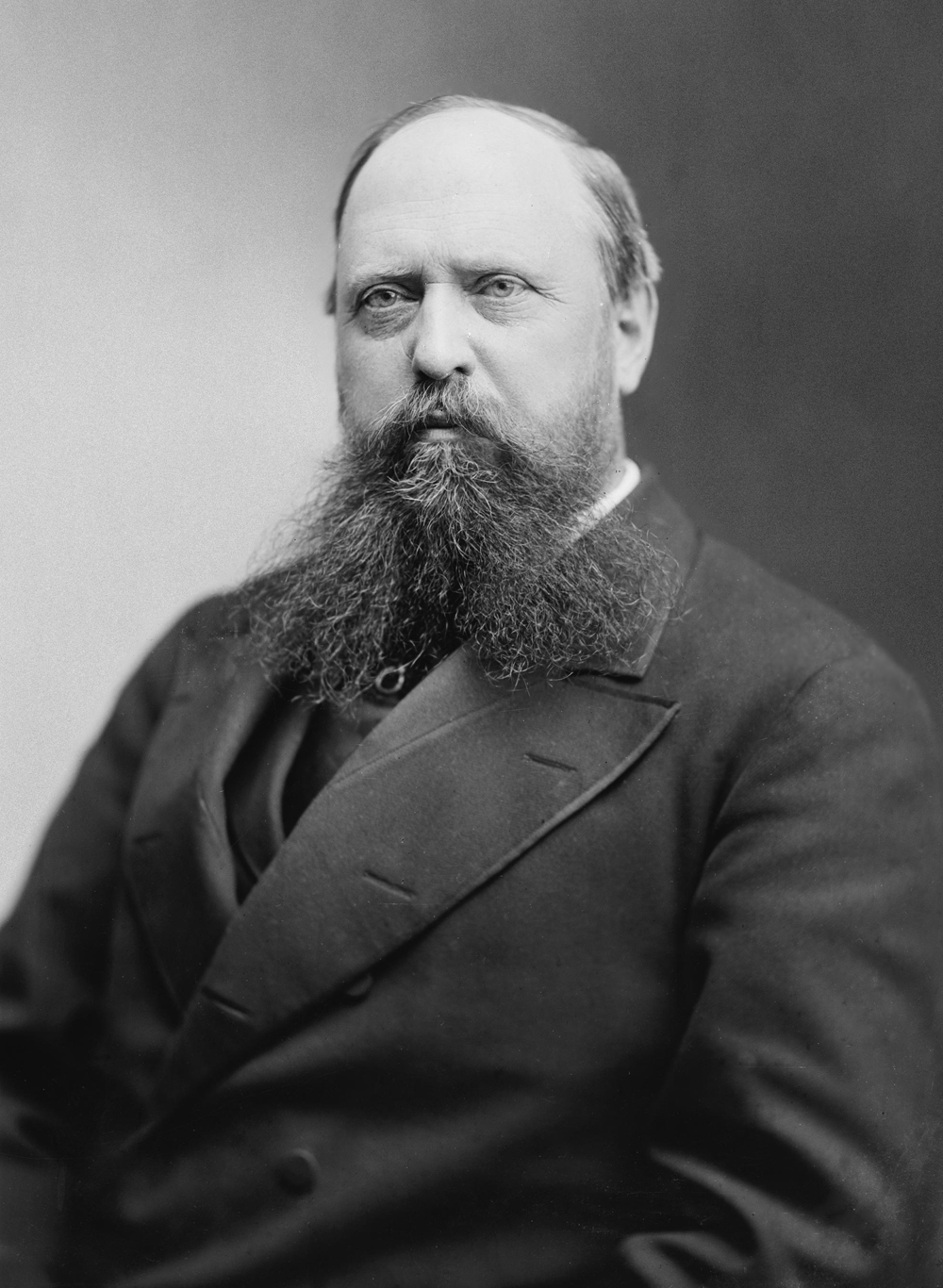
Othniel Charles Marsh, Yale

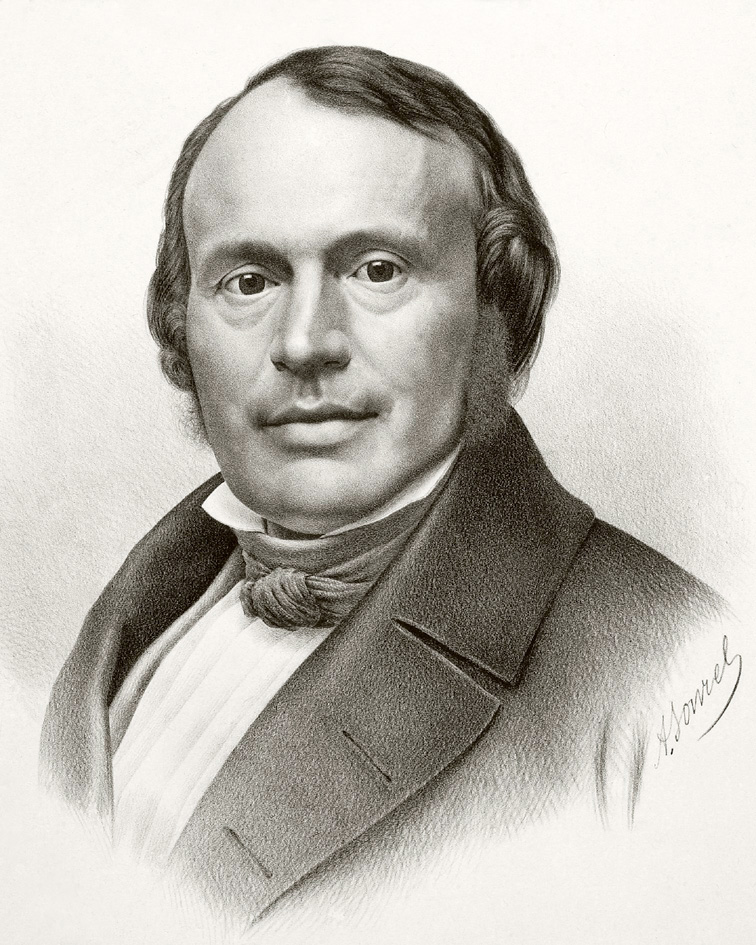
Louis Agassiz, Harvard

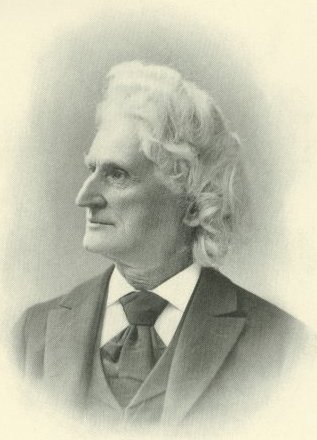
James Dwight Dana, Yale

While he maintained a small collection at KSAC, the majority of his finds were sent to Eastern paleontologists to be described. He initially corresponded in this fashion with Fielding Bradford Meek at the Smithsonian (primarily concerning molluscs), Leo Lesquereux (plants), Edward Drinker Cope at the Academy of Natural Sciences in Philadelphia (vertebrates), Othniel Charles Marsh at the Peabody Museum of Natural History at Yale, Louis Agassiz at Harvard, and James Dwight Dana at Yale. In turn, Cope visited Mudge in 1871, and Cope, Marsh, and Lesquerenx all visited in 1872. Cope and Lesquerenx published most of Mudge's discoveries from this period.

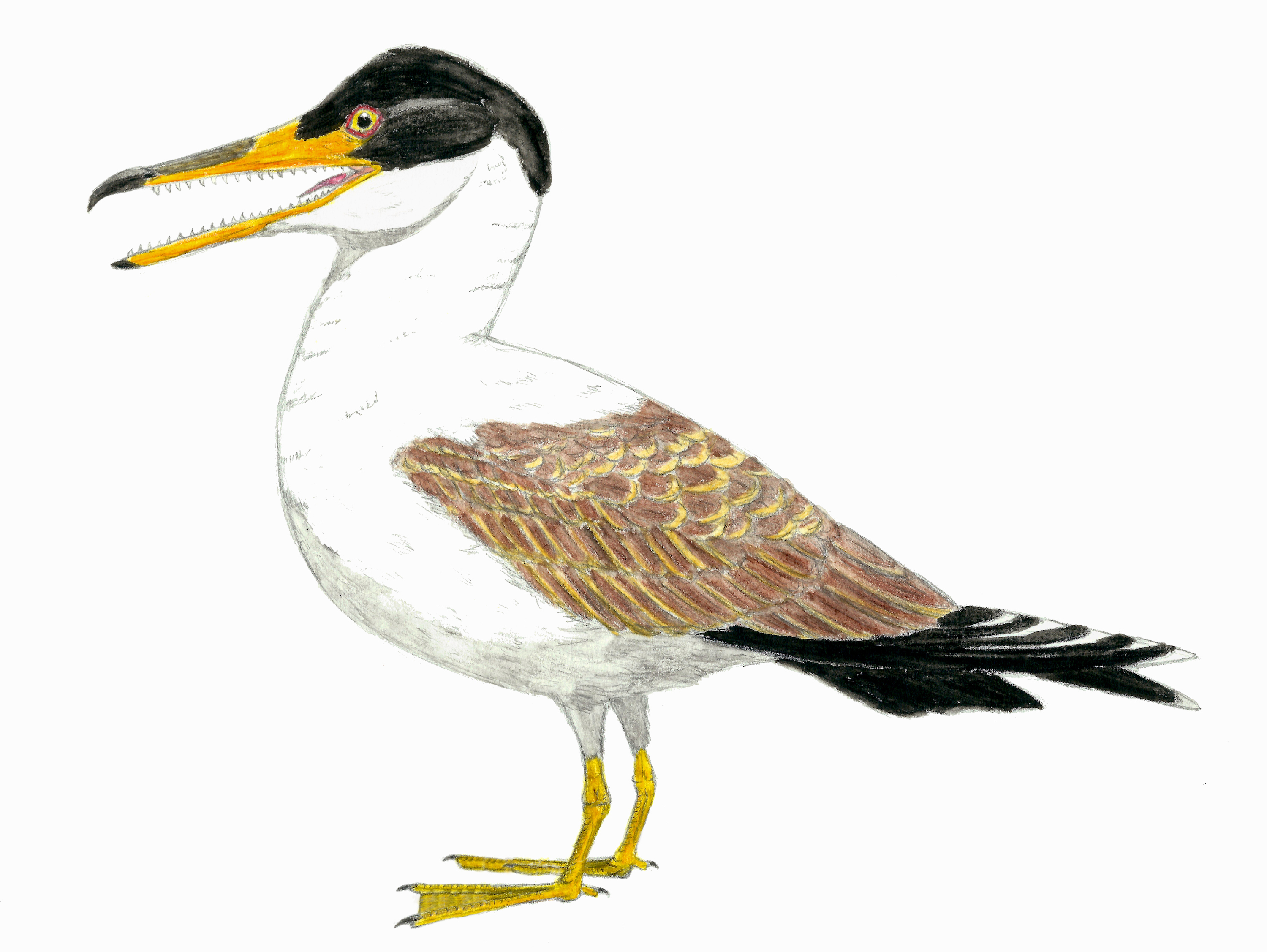
Reconstruction of Ichthyornis

Mudge discovered Ichthyornis in 1872. While he initially planned to ship the specimen to Cope, he heard of Othniel Charles Marsh's interest and sent it instead to his former acquaintance from Connecticut. Marsh first described the bird in 1872, but misidentified the toothed jaw as belonging to a type of lizard. Marsh associated the jaw with the avian postcranial elements and published the new data the next year. An analysis in 1952 concluded the jaw actually belonged to a mosasaur, but a reevaluation in 1967 and new specimens confirmed Marsh's assessment.

This was the first bird described with teeth; Richard Owen's original description of the London Specimen of Archaeopteryx in 1861 did not recognize its associated teeth, and assumed the bird had a beak. This was also the start of Mudge's association with Marsh, as the rivalry between Cope and Marsh (known as the "Bone Wars") heated up.

=== Fossils for Marsh ===
After his dismissal from KSAC in 1874, Mudge wrote to Marsh:

When you were here, you stated that you should like to employ one or more young men to collect fossils in western Kansas. As perhaps you may have learned, I have been summarily discharged (with two other professors) from this college. This has been done by an incompetent, conceited clergyman, who is acting as president.

— February 3, 1874 letter in the Yale Archives

Marsh hired Mudge to lead fossil hunting expeditions. He was assisted on his 1874 expedition by Samuel Wendell Williston, who started leading his own expeditions in 1877. Mudge primarily focused on the Kansas Chalk from 1874 to 1876, but from 1876 to 1879 he expanded into Colorado discovering some of the first Jurassic dinosaurs in the American West. According to Blackmar, "in one year he shipped over three tons of fossils, etc., to New Haven"

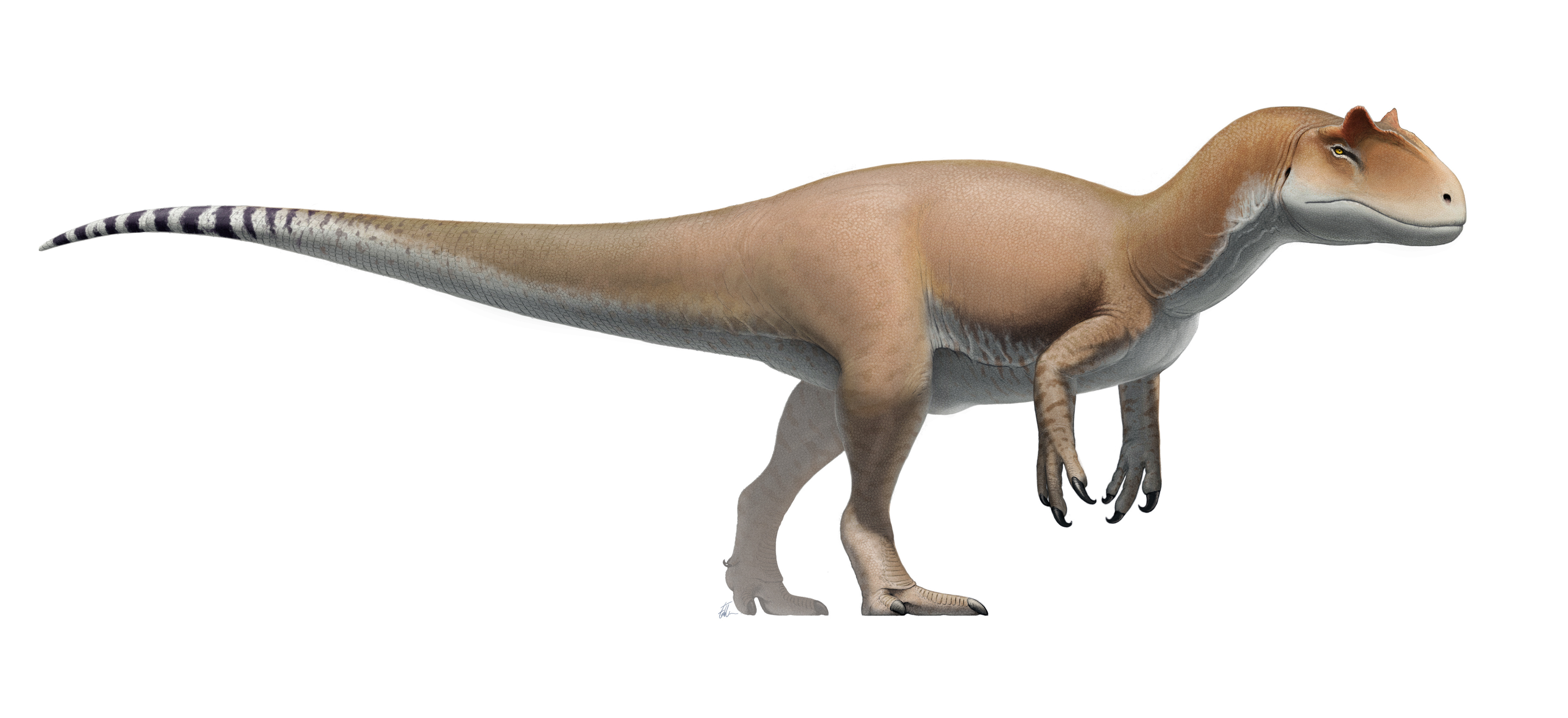
A modern depiction of Allosaurus.

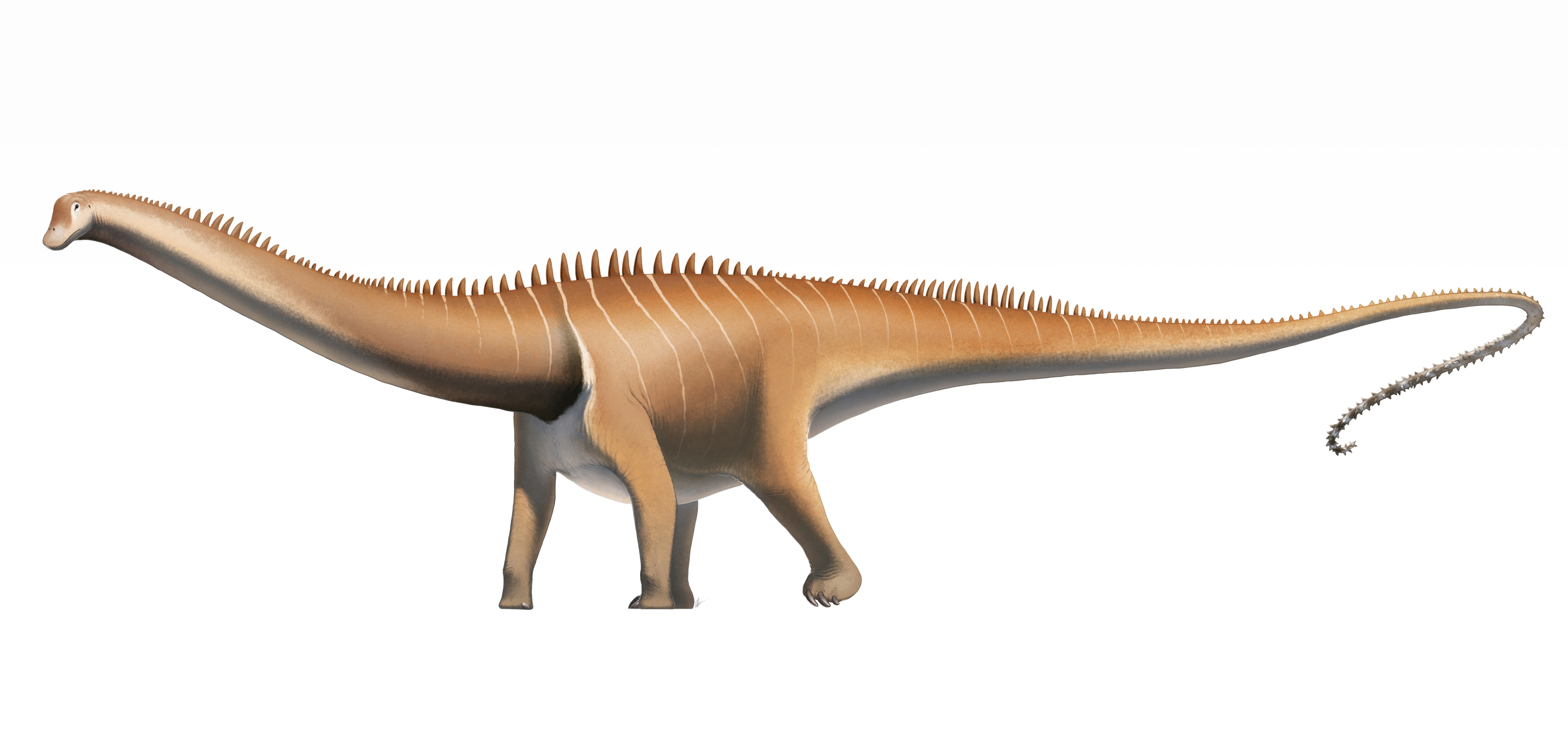
A modern depiction of Diplodocus

Marsh's rival Cope in turn had Oramel Lucas and Charles Hazelius Sternberg seeking out new finds. In 1877, Cope's team was making remarkable finds at Como Bluff, Wyoming near Cañon City, Colorado, and Marsh sent Mudge to establish a quarry near the location. While the quarry was eventually abandoned because the bones were too fragile to transport, Mudge and Williston discovered the holotype specimens of Allosaurus (A. fragilis) and Diplodocus (D. longus) in 1877 before the quarry was closed, and both species were named by Marsh, the former in 1877 and the latter in 1878.

== Legacy ==
As long as science has a name and place in the great central plains of the North American continent, Prof. Mudge will not be forgotten as a scientific explorer and discoverer

— John D. Parker, "Memorial of Prof. Benjamin F. Mudge"

With John D. Parker of Lincoln College (now Washburn University), Mudge founded the Kansas Natural History Society in 1867 (which became the Kansas Academy of Science in 1871). He was elected its first president, and published many of his scientific papers in its Transactions., and he became a fellow of the American Association for the Advancement of Science in 1878. He died outside his home of a "stroke of apoplexy" on November 21, 1879, and was buried two days later on Cemetery Hill.

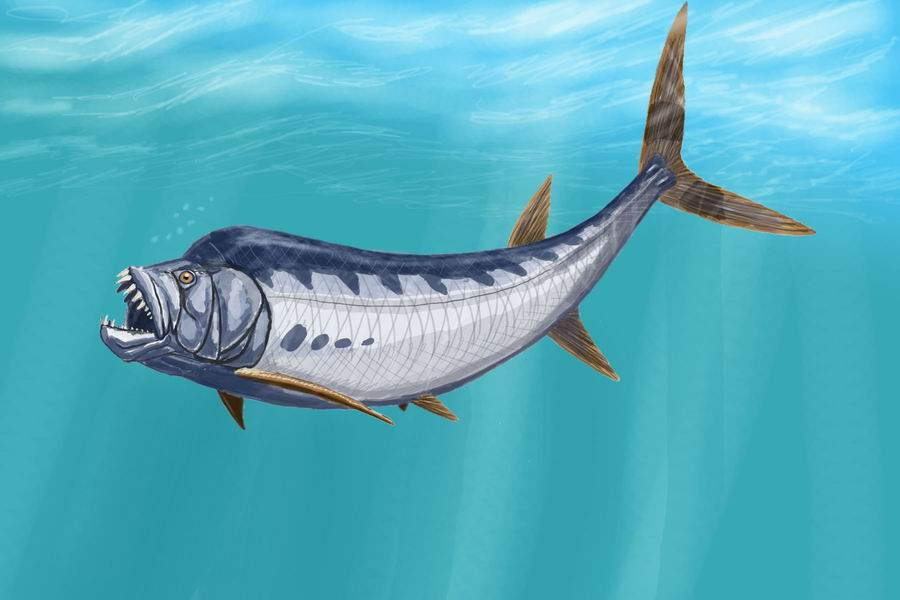
Xiphactinus, from the late Cretaceous Niobraran Sea of Kansas

Three species were named in his honor. Cope named a mosasaur species Liodon mudgei in 1871; though it is now considered to be a specimen of Platecarpus tympaniticus, Liodon remains as a junior synonym. The jaw of the Ichthyornis that Marsh originally believed belonged to a saurian was named Colonosaurus mudgei. Lesquerenx also a named a species of oak Quercus mudgeii in 1872. Mudge himself named the Fort Hays member of the Niobrara Formation in 1876.

During his career, he discovered specimens of mosasaurs and plesiosaurs; late Cretaceous leaves; various saurian and pythonomorphan reptiles; many genera of fish including Xiphactinus, Ichthyodectes, Erisichthe, Protosphyraena, and Saurocephalus; molluscs; and trace fossils including gastroliths and Pennsylvanian footprints. In addition to more than 80 species, his finds are in the collections of major museums, including more than 300 specimens in the collection of the Peabody Museum at Yale.

== Beliefs and personality ==
Mudge was a member of temperance organizations, and during his tenure as mayor of Lynn closed many saloons. In Kentucky and later in abolitionist Kansas, was known for opposition to slavery. Parker notes that during the Civil War:

Some runaway slaves from Missouri came to Prof. Mudge for work and protection. Their masters offered a large reward for their recovery, and his home and life were threatened in a midnight attack. He would not yield to threats, however, but protected the refugees, and saved them from being dragged back into slavery.

He had a keen interest in natural history. His protégé Williston wrote in 1898:

The first to make any systematic collections of fossils from the Cretaceous of Kansas was the late Prof. B. F. Mudge, at that time professor of geology in the Kansas Agricultural College. I was a student at that time under him at this college, and well remember the ardent enthusiasm that he evinced in the discoveries he made.

Mudge had a systematic approach, and kept excellent records of both the locality of his discoveries and the actual specimens. From Dale Russell's 1967 Systematics and Morphology of American Mosasaurs:

... special mention is due to Prof. B. F. Mudge, who collected for Marsh during the summers of 1874–1876. The industry and thoroughness with which he work [sic] the Niobrara Chalk, the excellence and number of his specimens, and the relative accuracy and completeness of his field journal were outstanding for his time

== Publications ==
Mudge was not a prolific publisher of scientific papers. According to the Kansas Geological Survey Online Bibliography of Geology, his entire output was contained in twenty-two publications, and most were very short.

- Mudge, B. F. (1866). "First annual report on the geology of Kansas for 1864". Kansas Geological Survey: 56 p.
- Mudge, B. F. (1866). "Discovery of fossil footmarks in the Liassic (?) formation in Kansas". American Journal of Science. Series 2. 41 (122): 174–176. Bibcode:1866AmJS...41..174M. doi:10.2475/ajs.s2-41.122.174. S2CID 131019537.
- Mudge, B. F. (1873). "Footprints in the middle coal measures". American Journal of Science. Series 3. 6: 228.
- Mudge, B. F. (1873). "Geology of the Arkansas". Kansas State Board of Agriculture, Transactions of 1872, First Annual Report: 408–410. (Reprinted in 1895 as Transactions of the Kansas Academy of Science 1: pp. 50–53.)
- Mudge, B. F. (1873). "Red sandstone of central Kansas". Kansas State Board of Agriculture, Transactions of 1872, First Annual Report: 394–396. (Reprinted in 1895 as Transactions of the Kansas Academy of Science 1: pp. 37–39. doi:10.2307/3623513)
- Mudge, B. F. (1874). "The geology of Kansas". Kansas State Board of Agriculture, Third Annual Report: 102–107. (Excerpts from Mudge, 1866.)
- Mudge, B. F. (1874). "Recent discoveries of fossil footprints in Kansas". Kansas State Board of Agriculture, Third Annual Report: 7–9. (Reprinted in 1896 as Transactions of the Kansas Academy of Science 2: pp. 71–74. doi:10.2307/3623467)
- Mudge, B. F. (1875). "Pliocene Tertiary of western Kansas". Kansas State Board of Agriculture, Third Annual Report. 3: 351–353. doi:10.2307/3623527. JSTOR 3623527. (Reprinted in 1896 as Transactions of the Kansas Academy of Science 3: pp. 113–117. doi:10.2307/3623527)
- Mudge, B. F. (1875). "Geology of Kansas". Kansas State Board of Agriculture, Fourth Annual Report: 107–127.
- Mudge, B. F. (1875). "Rare forms of fish in Kansas". Kansas State Board of Agriculture, Third Annual Report: 356. (Reprinted in 1896 as Transactions of the Kansas Academy of Science 3: pp. 121–122.)
- Mudge, B. F. (1875). "A geological survey of Kansas". Kansas State Board of Agriculture, Third Annual Report: 342–344. (Reprinted in 1896 as Transactions of the Kansas Academy of Science 3: pp. 101–102.)
- Mudge, B. F. (1875). "On the mineral resources of Kansas". Kansas State Board of Agriculture, Third Annual Report: 102–107.
- Mudge, B. F. (1876). "Notes on the Tertiary and Cretaceous periods of Kansas". U.S. Geological and Geographical Survey of the Territories (F.V. Hayden), Bulletin. 2 (3): 211–221.
- Mudge, B. F. (1877). "Annual report of the committee on geology for the year ending November 1, 1876". Transactions of the Kansas Academy of Science. 5. Kansas Academy of Science: 4–5. doi:10.2307/3623490. JSTOR 3623490. (Reprinted in 1906 as 5: pp. 4–5.)
- Mudge, B. F. (1877). "Bison latifrons in Kansas". Transactions of the Kansas Academy of Science. 5: 9–10. doi:10.2307/3623492. JSTOR 3623492. (Reprinted in 1906 as p. 10.)
- Mudge, B. F. (1877). "Notes on the Tertiary and Cretaceous periods of Kansas". U.S. Geological and Geographical Survey of the Territories (F.V. Hayden), Annual Report. In, Hayden, F.V.; U.S. Geological and Geographical Survey of the Territories, Embracing Colorado and Parts of Adjacent Territories; Being a Report of Progress of the Exploration for the Year 1875 (9): 277–294.
- Mudge, B. F. (1878). "Geology of Kansas". Kansas State Board of Agriculture, First Biennial Report: 46–88.
- Mudge, B. F. (1878). "Fossil leaves in Kansas". Western Review of Science and Industry. 1: 654–656.
- Mudge, B. F. (1879). "The new sink hole in Meade Co., Kans". Kansas City Review of Science and Industry. 3: 152–153.
- Mudge, B. F. (1879). "Are birds derived from dinosaurs?". Kansas City Review of Science and Industry. 3: 224–226.
- Mudge, B. F. (1881). "List of minerals found in Kansas". Transactions of the Kansas Academy of Science. 7. Kansas Academy of Science: 27–29. doi:10.2307/3623575. JSTOR 3623575.
- Mudge, B. F. (1881). "Metamorphic deposit in Woodson County". Transactions of the Kansas Academy of Science. 7: 12–13. doi:10.2307/3623571. JSTOR 3623571. (Reprinted in 1906 as pp. 11–13.)

== Footnotes ==
Political offices
Preceded by George Hood	Mayor of Lynn, Massachusetts; June 16, 1852 to April 4, 1853	Succeeded by Daniel C. Baker
