= George C. Higgins =

American politician (1845–1933)

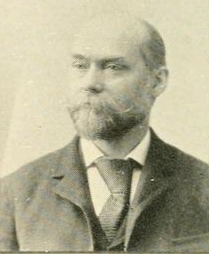

22nd Mayor of Lynn, Massachusetts
- In office 1888–1888
- Preceded by: George D. Hart
- Succeeded by: Asa T. Newhall

Member of the Massachusetts House of Representatives Nineteenth Essex District

Member of the Lynn, Massachusetts Common Council
- In office 1881–1883

Personal details
- Born: November 19, 1845 Orleans, Massachusetts
- Died: August 15, 1933 (aged 87) Middleboro, Massachusetts
- Party: Republican
- Spouse: Ellen S. Irving

Military service
- Allegiance: United States of America; Union
- Branch/service: Union Army
- Years of service: 1864
- Unit: Company D 8th Massachusetts Infantry Regiment
- Battles/wars: American Civil War

George Cleaveland Higgins (November 19, 1845 – August 15, 1933) was a Massachusetts politician who served as a Lynn, Massachusetts, city councilor, a member of the Massachusetts House of Representatives and as the 22nd Mayor of Lynn, Massachusetts.

Higgins was born in Orleans, Massachusetts on November 19, 1845. In 1862 Higgins moved to Lynn, Massachusetts. He died in 1933.

== Notes ==
Political offices
Preceded by George D. Hart	Mayor of Lynn, Massachusetts; 1888 to 1888	Succeeded by Asa T. Newhall
