= Irving E. Kane =

American politician (1930–2019)

47th Mayor of Lynn, Massachusetts
- In office 1966–1969
- Preceded by: M. Henry Wall
- Succeeded by: J. Warren Cassidy

Personal details
- Born: May 2, 1930 Lynn, Massachusetts, U.S.
- Died: October 8, 2019 (aged 89)
- Spouse: Mary Judith Kane
- Occupation: Politician and attorney

Irving Edward Kane (May 2, 1930 – October 8, 2019) was an American politician in the state of Massachusetts, who served as the 47th Mayor of Lynn, Massachusetts.

== Life and career ==
Kane was born in Lynn, Massachusetts on May 2, 1930. The young James Carrigan was a member of his campaign staff and, shaped by the experience, six years later he was elected to a seat in the State House, and a State Senate seat in a special election a year after that. Kane died on October 8, 2019, at the age of 89.

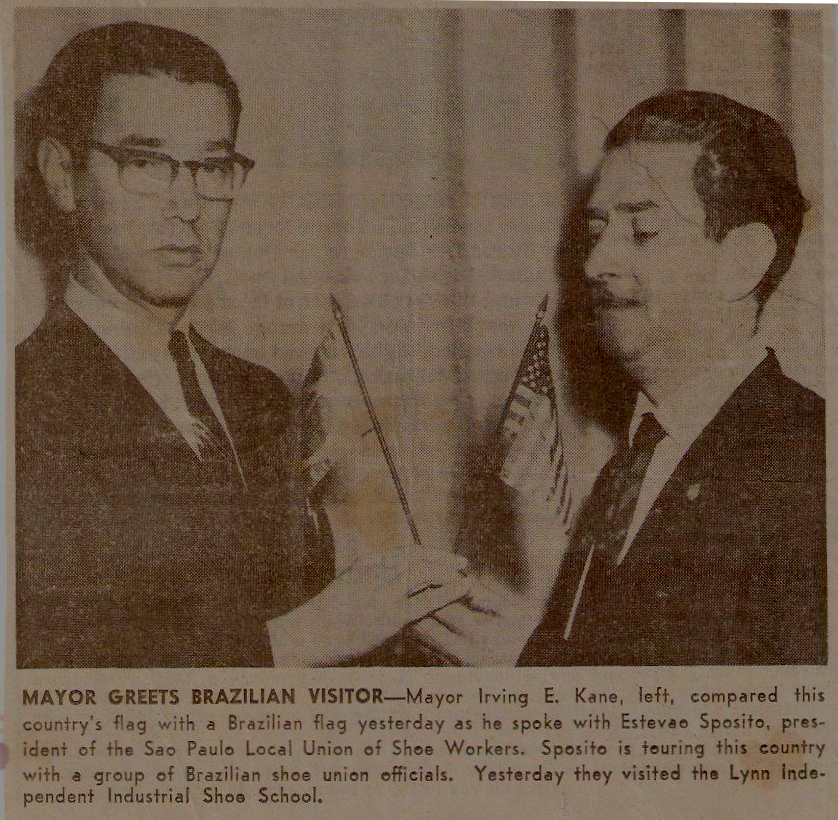
A clipping of newspaper The Lynn Daily Evening Item, from its January 31, 1968 edition. The picture portrays Irving E. Kane, then serving as the mayor of Lynn, Massachusetts, on the left side. He is exchanging bunting flags with Brazilian citizen Estevão Spósito, then serving as the president for the São Paulo union of shoe workers.

== Notes ==
Political offices
Preceded by M. Henry Wall	Mayor of Lynn, Massachusetts; 1966 to 1969	Succeeded by J. Warren Cassidy
