= George D. Hart =

American politician (1846–1932)

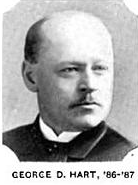

Member of the Massachusetts Senate Fifth Essex District
- In office January 1890 – January 1891
- Succeeded by: B. Frank Southwick

21st Mayor of Lynn, Massachusetts
- In office January 4, 1886 – 1887
- Preceded by: John R. Baldwin
- Succeeded by: George C. Higgins

Member of the Lynn, Massachusetts Common Council Ward 5
- In office 1885 – January 4, 1886

Personal details
- Born: December 7, 1846 Malden, Massachusetts
- Died: February 24, 1932 (aged 85) Lynn, Massachusetts
- Occupation: Sign writer
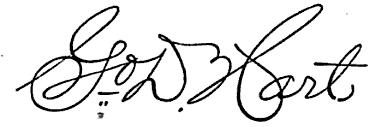
- Signature

Military service
- Allegiance: United States of America; Union
- Unit: Company B, 4th Regiment Massachusetts Volunteer Heavy Artillery
- Battles/wars: American Civil War

George D. Hart (December 7, 1846 – February 24, 1932) was a Massachusetts politician who served as a Massachusetts State Senator and as a member of the Common Council, and as the 21st Mayor of Lynn, Massachusetts.

== Notes ==
Political offices
Preceded by John R. Baldwin	21st Mayor of Lynn, Massachusetts; January 4, 1886 to 1887	Succeeded by George C. Higgins
