= Walter F. Meserve =

1972 Acting mayor of Lynn, Massachusetts, USA

Acting Mayor of Lynn, Massachusetts
- In office April 1972 – July 1972
- Preceded by: Pasquale Caggiano
- Succeeded by: Antonio J. Marino

Personal details
- Born: June 13, 1921
- Died: October 1, 1984 (aged 63)

Walter F. Meserve (June 13, 1921 – October 1, 1984) was an American politician in Massachusetts who served as the acting Mayor of Lynn, Massachusetts.

== Notes ==
Political offices
Preceded by Pasquale Caggiano	Mayor of Lynn, Massachusetts; 1972 to 1972	Succeeded by Antonio J. Marino
