= Asa T. Newhall =

American politician

Asa Tarbell Newhall
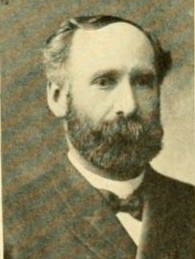

23rd Mayor of Lynn, Massachusetts
- In office 1889 – January 5, 1891
- Preceded by: George C. Higgins
- Succeeded by: E. Knowlton Fogg

Member of the Massachusetts House of Representatives 12th Essex District
- In office 1904–1904
- Preceded by: William B. Phinney
- Succeeded by: Michael F. Phelan
- Majority: 64

Member of the Massachusetts State Senate 5th Essex District
- In office 1887–1887

Member of the Lynn, Massachusetts Board of Aldermen
- In office 1901–1903

Member of the Lynn, Massachusetts Common Council
- In office 1885–1886

Member of the Lynn, Massachusetts School Committee
- In office 1891–1895

Personal details
- Born: December 23, 1850 Lynnfield, Massachusetts, US
- Died: December 1937 (aged 86–87) United States
- Party: Democratic
- Spouse: Cinderella Chandler
- Children: 4
- Occupation: Farmer and Market gardener

Asa Tarbell Newhall (1846-1937) was a Massachusetts politician who served in both branches of the Massachusetts legislature, and as the 23rd Mayor of Lynn, Massachusetts. Newhall also served in both branches of the Lynn city council and on the city's school committee.

== Massachusetts House of Representatives ==
=== 1903 State Representative election ===
In 1903 Newhall was elected as a Democrat to serve in the Massachusetts House of Representatives of 1904. In the 1903 election Newhall received 1,371 votes coming in second behind Republican candidate John W. Blaney who received 1,434 votes, and just ahead of fellow Democrat Michael F. Phelan who received 1,307 votes. The district Newhall ran in sent two representatives to the Massachusetts House, so although Newhall came in second in the vote total he was elected. While in the House of 1904 Newhall served on the Committee on Prisons.

=== 1904 State Representative electoral defeat ===
In 1904 Newhall was defeated in his bid for reelection. Newhall placed third in the balloting behind Republican Arthur W. Barker and fellow Democratic party candidate Michael F. Phelan.

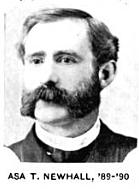
Asa T. Newhall as the Mayor of Lynn, Massachusetts

He died in 1937.

== Notes ==
Political offices
Preceded by George C. Higgins	23rd Mayor of Lynn, Massachusetts; 1899 to January 5, 1891	Succeeded by E. Knowlton Fogg
