= Killing of Michael Costin =

2000 crime in Massachusetts, United States

On July 6, 2000, Michael Costin, a 40-year-old father of four from Lynnfield, Massachusetts, died one day after a fistfight with Thomas Junta, a 42-year-old father of two, at the Burbank Ice Arena in Reading, Massachusetts. Junta's trial for manslaughter in January 2002 brought him national attention as the "hockey dad". Junta was convicted and spent eight years in prison.

== Killing ==
On the afternoon of July 5, 2000, Burbank Ice Arena was open for an informal public ice hockey "stick practice", in which a group consisting mostly of children around the age of 10 were playing. Michael Costin, the father of three of the participating children (and the nephew of politician Thomas P. Costin Jr.), was the only adult on the ice. Contact between players was forbidden in the practice session, but some occurred anyway, and Thomas Junta's 10-year-old son Quinlan nearly had his nose broken in one of these incidents. Junta was watching from the stands and, upon witnessing the incident, approached the ice and told Costin that the practice was getting too rough. Costin replied, "That's hockey", and the two men had an argument.

Shortly thereafter, the practice session ended and the participants returned to the locker room to change out of their hockey gear. Junta and Costin met again in an alcove between two locker rooms, where they began to physically fight. An assistant manager at the rink, Nancy Blanchard, called 9-1-1, while other attendees broke up the fight. Blanchard then told Junta to leave the arena.

Junta left the building, leaving his son to finish changing in the locker room, but returned a few minutes later. Blanchard attempted to block Junta from entering, but he shoved her aside, causing a bruise on her arm. Junta then approached Costin for a third time and the two resumed their fistfight. Junta then tackled Costin to the floor and punched him, although there was disagreement on how many blows Costin received. By the time Junta was pulled away from the fight, Costin was lying motionless on the floor. Costin was taken to Lahey Hospital & Medical Center in Burlington, where he died of his injuries on the afternoon of July 6.

== Legal proceedings ==
Before Costin's death, Junta was charged with assault and battery. After the death, the charge was upgraded to voluntary manslaughter. Junta was arraigned on July 10, 2000, but his cash bail was set at $5,000 and he walked free the same day.

Junta's highly publicized trial took place in January 2002. The jury acquitted him on the charge of voluntary manslaughter, instead convicting Junta of involuntary manslaughter, a lesser offense, on the basis of his claim of self-defense. Judge Charles Grabau sentenced Junta to incarceration for six to ten years. Junta was incarcerated at Massachusetts Correctional Institution – Shirley.

Junta filed a motion for a new trial in February 2003, after the Office of the Chief Medical Examiner learned that medical examiner Dr. Stanton Kessler had given a presentation on Costin's wounds to an American Academy of Forensic Sciences conference in Seattle, in which Kessler described the fatal injury to Costin's vertebral artery as one which could easily result from a chiropractor visit. Junta's lawyers alleged that the prosecution had failed to disclose potentially exculpatory evidence, in violation of Brady v. Maryland. The Massachusetts Appeals Court upheld Junta's conviction in September 2004.

In February 2006, Junta filed for a writ of habeas corpus in federal district court. The case was taken to the United States Court of Appeals for the First Circuit, which ruled against Junta's appeal on August 12, 2010, two weeks before the end of his prison sentence.

In April 2008, Junta was denied parole for the second time. In denying his request, the Massachusetts Parole Board said that "Junta had failed to fully accept responsibility for his actions". Junta was released at the completion of his sentence on August 27, 2010.

== Legacy ==
The trial received extensive coverage in the national news media and was broadcast in full on Court TV. While dozens of previous incidents of violence had occurred among parents at youth sports events, this was the first known case resulting in a fatality.

The case was parodied in a 2003 episode of The Simpsons, "The Regina Monologues", in which Bart and Milhouse play a video game called "Hockey Dad" where the object is to kill the rival hockey dad. The Australian surf rock band Hockey Dad takes its name from the Simpsons joke.

Quinlan Junta, Thomas' son, died at age 21 in October 2011. Earlier that year, he was one of four men charged with committing a home invasion, but the case had not yet been tried at the time of his death. Thomas Junta died of pancreatic cancer on December 16, 2020.
