= Albert V. DiVirgilio =

American politician (born 1942)

53rd Mayor of Lynn, Massachusetts
- In office 1986–1991
- Preceded by: Antonio J. Marino
- Succeeded by: Patrick J. McManus

Personal details
- Born: June 9, 1942 (age 84)

Albert Vincent DiVirgilio (born June 9, 1942) is an American former politician in the state of Massachusetts who served as the 53rd Mayor of Lynn, Massachusetts.

== Life and career ==
DiVirgilio was born in Lynn, Massachusetts on June 9, 1942. He spent eighteen years as a member of the Lynn City Council before defeating mayor Antonio J. Marino in the 1985 mayoral election.

Under DiVirgilio's leadership, Lynn desegregated their public schools. Lynn also banned the sale of pit bulls while DiVirgilio was mayor.

DiVirgilio lost reelection in 1991 to City Councilor Patrick J. McManus.

After leaving politics, DiVirgilio opened an insurance agency.

His son Albert DiVirgilio, Jr. is a former Lynn City Councilor.

== Notes ==
Political offices
Preceded by Antonio J. Marino	Mayor of Lynn, Massachusetts; 1986 to 1991	Succeeded by Patrick J. McManus
