= Andrews Breed =

American politician (1919–1983)

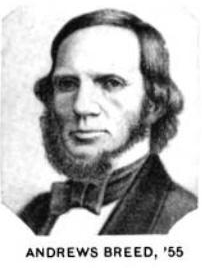

Mayor of Lynn, Massachusetts
- In office January 1, 1855 – January 7, 1856
- Preceded by: Thomas P. Richardson
- Succeeded by: Ezra W. Mudge

Personal details
- Born: September 20, 1794 Lynn, Massachusetts, U.S.
- Died: April 20, 1881 (aged 86) Lancaster, Massachusetts, U.S.
- Resting place: Pine Grove Cemetery; Lynn, Massachusetts
- Party: Whig

Andrews Breed (September 20, 1794 – April 20, 1881) was an American businessman and politician who served as mayor of Lynn, Massachusetts from 1855 to 1856.

== Early life ==
Breed was born on September 20, 1794, in Lynn. He was a descendant of one of the city's first European settlers, Allen Breed. One of his second cousins, Hiram N. Breed, was mayor of Lynn from 1861 to 1862.

When Breed was five years old his family moved to Salem, Massachusetts, where his father, also named Andrews Breed became manager of a pub. He attended school until the age of 14, when he left to assist his father. In 1813, the elder Breed became landlord of the Hotel Lynn, one of the city's most prominent hotels. When Breed turned 18, he joined the Massachusetts Militia, where he served as an adjutant of the Fourth Regiment under Colonel Samuel Brimblecom during the War of 1812.

== Business career ==
In 1816, Breed moved to Charlestown, where he joined the West India trade firm of Skinner & Kurd as a clerk and bookkeeper. He became a partner in the firm six years later. In 1829, he returned to Lynn and formed a West India goods firm with two of his brothers. During this time he also took over the Lynn Hotel. He left the West India trade in 1836, but his firm continued under different management. From 1832 to 1848 he was the general agent and one of the largest shareholders of the Lynn Whaling Company. In 1853, he was named superintendent of the newly completed Saugus Branch Railroad. He remained with the Saugus Branch until it was consolidated into the Eastern Railroad in 1855. He also served as secretary and treasurer of the Lynn Mutual Fire Insurance for 34 years, and was president of the Lynn Institution for Savings for 10 years. He was also president of the Union Insurance Co., the first secretary of the Sagamore Mutual Fire Insurance Co., and a partner in the shoe manufacturing firm of Breed & Abbott.

== Politics ==
In 1844, Breed was chief marshal of a Whig Party meeting in Lynn that attracted over 12,000 attendees. He was a member of the city's first board of assessors and was chief engineer of the fire department for seven years. He served one term as mayor of Lynn (1855 to 1856).

== Personal life ==
On August 29, 1822, Breed married Susan Davis of Westford, Massachusetts. They had six children. In 1829, he constructed a large home in Lynn on property that had belonged to his grandfather. Financial hardship forced him to sell his home and other properties in 1848. By 1855, he had recovered enough financially to build a new home on the Lynn Common, where he resided until 1874, when he moved to Lancaster, Massachusetts to live with his son Frank. Breed died in Lancaster on April 20, 1881.
