= Antonio J. Marino =

American politician (1921–2013)

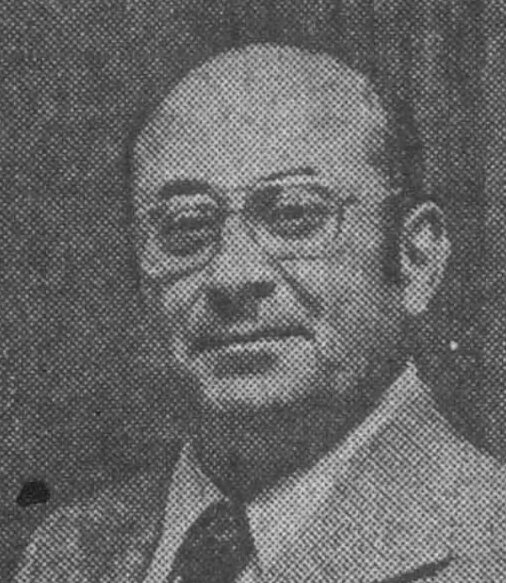
- Marino in 1976

52nd Mayor of Lynn, Massachusetts
- In office 1976–1985
- Preceded by: David L. Phillips
- Succeeded by: Albert V. DiVirgilio

50th Mayor of Lynn, Massachusetts
- In office July 1972 – 1973
- Preceded by: Walter F. Meserve
- Succeeded by: David L. Phillips

Personal details
- Born: January 7, 1921 Brooklyn, New York, U.S.
- Died: November 17, 2013 (aged 92) Bedford, Massachusetts, U.S.

Antonio J. Marino (January 7, 1921 − November 17, 2013) was an American politician who served as the 50th and 52nd Mayor of Lynn, Massachusetts.

Marino was born in Brooklyn, New York, to Emilio and Elettra (née Senatore) and was raised in Lynn. He graduated from Lynn Classical High School and Burdette College.

He died at the Edith Nourse Rogers Veterans Hospital in Bedford, Massachusetts, at the age of 92.

Political offices
| Preceded by Walter F. Meserve | Mayor of Lynn, Massachusetts; July 1972 to 1973 | Succeeded by David L. Phillips |
| Preceded by David L. Phillips | Mayor of Lynn, Massachusetts; 1976 to 1985 | Succeeded by Albert V. DiVirgilio |
