= Henry W. Eastham =

American politician

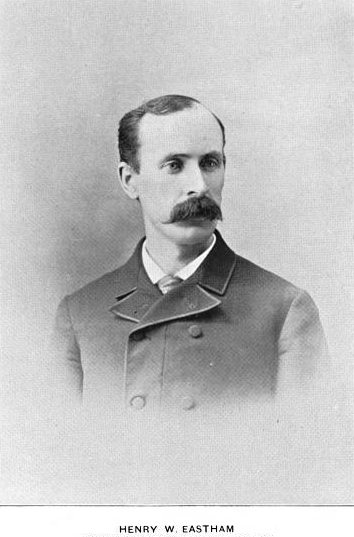

30th Mayor Lynn, Massachusetts
- In office 1903–1905
- Preceded by: William Shepherd
- Succeeded by: Charles Neal Barney

President of the Lynn, Massachusetts Board of Aldermen
- In office 1902–1902
- Preceded by: Charles C. Fry
- Succeeded by: George W. Coffin

Member of the Lynn, Massachusetts Board of Aldermen
- In office 1901–1902

President of the Lynn, Massachusetts Common Council
- In office 1900–1900
- Preceded by: Orville A. Clough
- Succeeded by: Charles Neal Barney

Member of the Lynn, Massachusetts Common Council Ward Six
- In office 1899l–1900

Personal details
- Occupation: Shoe knife and machinery business

Henry W. Eastham was a Massachusetts businessman and politician who served as a member and President of the Common Council, and as the 30th Mayor of Lynn, Massachusetts.

== Shoe machinery business ==
Eastham was engaged in the manufacture of shoe manufacturing equipment, supplying the numerous shoe manufacturing companies that existed in Lynn at the time. In December 1904 Eastham sold his shoe knives and machinery business to the United Shoe Machinery Corporation. Eastham later purchased the C.W. Dodge & Co. and operated it as the Eastham Shoe Machinery and Supply Company.

== President of the Lynn Board of Aldermen ==
On December 30, 1901, Eastham was chosen as President of the Lynn Board of Aldermen for 1902.

== Notes ==
Political offices
Preceded by Orville A. Clough	President of the Lynn, Massachusetts; Common Council; 1900 - 1900	Succeeded by Charles Neal Barney
Preceded by Charles C. Fry	President of the Lynn, Massachusetts; Board of Aldermen; 1902 to 1902	Succeeded by George W. Coffin
Preceded by William Shepherd	Mayor of Lynn, Massachusetts; 1903 to 1905	Succeeded by Charles Neal Barney
