= Jacob M. Lewis =

American politician

Jacob Meek Lewis
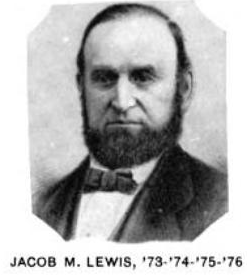

15th Mayor of Lynn, Massachusetts
- In office January 6, 1873 – January 1, 1877
- Preceded by: James N. Buffum
- Succeeded by: Samuel M. Bubier

Member of the Lynn, Massachusetts Board of Aldermen
- In office 1859–1868

Member of the Lynn, Massachusetts Common Council
- In office 1853–1853

Personal details
- Born: October 13, 1823; Lynn, Massachusetts
- Died: January 5, 1905 (aged 81); Lynn, Massachusetts
- Spouse(s): Roxanna W. Stone, m. October 13, 1845

Jacob Meek Lewis (October 13, 1823 – January 5, 1905) was a Massachusetts politician who served as the 15th Mayor of Lynn, Massachusetts, USA.

== Notes ==
Political offices
Preceded by James N. Buffum	15th Mayor of Lynn, Massachusetts; January 6, 1873 to January 1, 1877	Succeeded by Samuel M. Bubier
