= Patrick J. McManus =

American politician

54th Mayor of Lynn, Massachusetts
- In office 1992–2001
- Preceded by: Albert V. DiVirgilio
- Succeeded by: Edward J. Clancy Jr.
- Majority: 3,708 (1991 election).

Member of the Lynn, Massachusetts City Council
- In office 1986–1992

Personal details
- Born: July 20, 1954 Lynn, Massachusetts, US
- Died: July 10, 2009 (aged 54) Lynn, Massachusetts, US
- Spouse: Debra Dorgan
- Children: 5
- Education: Bowdoin College; Suffolk University, M.B.A.; Boston College, J.D.
- Profession: Lawyer and accountant

Patrick J. McManus (July 20, 1954 – July 10, 2009) was a Massachusetts attorney and politician who served as the 54th Mayor of Lynn, Massachusetts.

== Early life ==
McManus was born in Lynn to Robert A. McManus and Kathryn "Kay" (Gainey) McManus.

== Member of the Lynn City Council ==
In 1985 McManus was elected to the first of three terms on the Lynn City Council.

In 1990, McManus was a finalist for the Town Manager's position in Saugus, Massachusetts. The job went to Massachusetts Department of Revenue Deputy Commissioner Edward J. Collins Jr.

== Mayor of Lynn ==
In 1991 McManus was elected Mayor by 3,708 votes over incumbent mayor Albert V. DiVirgilio, McManus received 13,601 votes, to DiVirgilio's 9,893. McManus served as mayor from 1992 to 2002.

== 2009 election and death ==
On June 9, 2009, McManus formally announced that he would run against incumbent Mayor Edward J. Clancy Jr. in that year's election. On July 10, 2009, McManus was found dead in his home.

== Notes ==
Political offices
Preceded by Albert F. Divirgilio	Mayor of Lynn, Massachusetts; 1992 to 2001	Succeeded by Edward J. Clancy Jr.
