= George Hood (Massachusetts politician) =

American politician

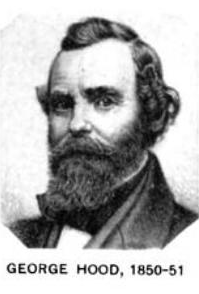

1st Mayor of Lynn, Massachusetts
- In office May 14, 1850 – June 16, 1852
- Preceded by: Board of Selectmen
- Succeeded by: Benjamin Franklin Mudge

Member of the Massachusetts State Senate
- In office 1843–1844
- Succeeded by: Francis S. Newhall

Member of the Massachusetts House of Representatives

Personal details
- Born: August 28, 1794 Lynn, Massachusetts
- Died: June 29, 1859 (aged 64) Worcester, Massachusetts
- Party: Democratic
- Spouse: Hermione Breed
- Children: Caroline Persis Hood
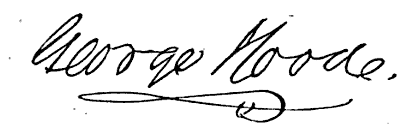
- Signature

George Hood (August 28, 1794 – June 29, 1859) was a Massachusetts politician who served in both houses of the Massachusetts legislature and as the first Mayor of Lynn, Massachusetts.

== Notes ==
Political offices
Preceded by Board of Selectmen	Mayor of Lynn, Massachusetts; May 14, 1850 to June 16, 1852	Succeeded by Benjamin F. Mudge
