= Alice Frances Blood =

American chemist (1880–1968)

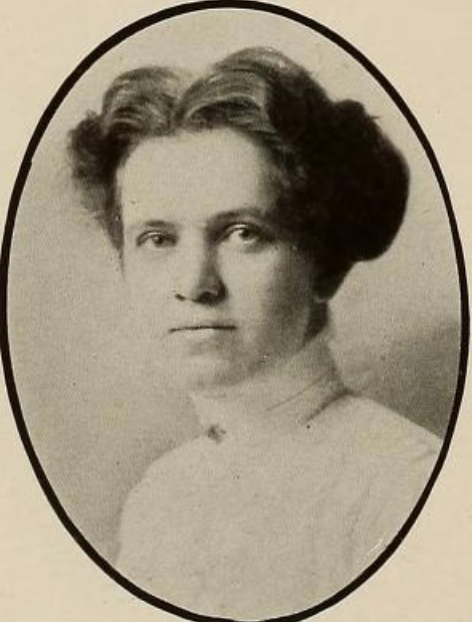
- Blood, from the 1913 yearbook of Simmons College
- Born: November 25, 1880; Lynn, Massachusetts, U.S.
- Died: March 20, 1968 (aged 87); Concord, New Hampshire, U.S.
- Occupations: Biochemist, college professor, home economist

Alice Frances Blood (November 25, 1880 – March 20, 1968) was an American biochemist and college professor. She was head of the home economics department at Simmons College in Boston from 1915 to 1941, and was president of the American Home Economics Association from 1922 to 1924.

== Early life and education ==
Blood was born in Lynn, Massachusetts, the daughter of Josiah Beaman Blood and Zeruah O. Watkins Blood. Her father and brothers owned a large grocery business, and her older half-sister Minnie E. Blood was a poet and relief worker based in Germany.

Blood graduated from Lynn English High School in 1899, studied under Ellen Swallow Richards and earned a bachelor's degree in chemistry from the Massachusetts Institute of Technology in 1903, and earned a PhD in biochemistry from Yale University in 1910.

== Career ==
Blood taught chemistry and nutrition at Simmons College beginning in 1904, and in 1915 was named head of the home economics department. She retired from Simmons in 1941. She was president of the American Home Economics Association from 1922 to 1924. She spoke at professional meetings and made public comments on a wide range of topics, including spanking, flappers, and dishwashing. She co-authored a home economics textbook published by Houghton Mifflin.

== Publications ==
- "Some Peculiarities of the Proteolytic Activity of Papaïn" (1910, with Lafayette Mendel)
- "The Erepsin of the Cabbage (Brassica oleracea)" (1910)
- Everyday Foods (1927, with Jessie W. Harris and Elisabeth Lacey Speer)

== Personal life ==
Blood moved to New Hampshire in retirement, and died at a hospital in Concord, New Hampshire, in 1968, at the age of 87.
