= Lynn, Massachusetts =

City in Essex County, Massachusetts, US

Lynn
- City
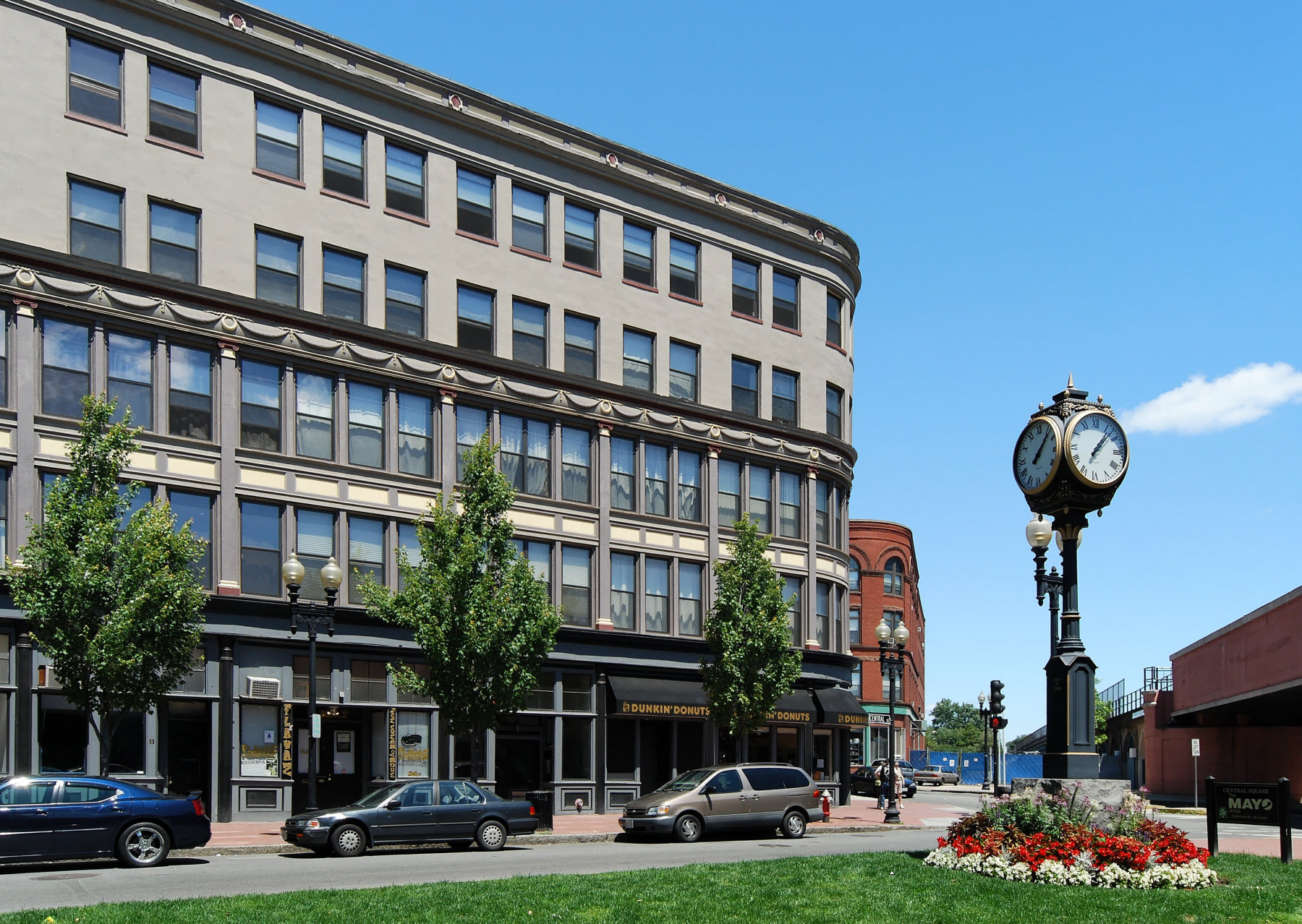
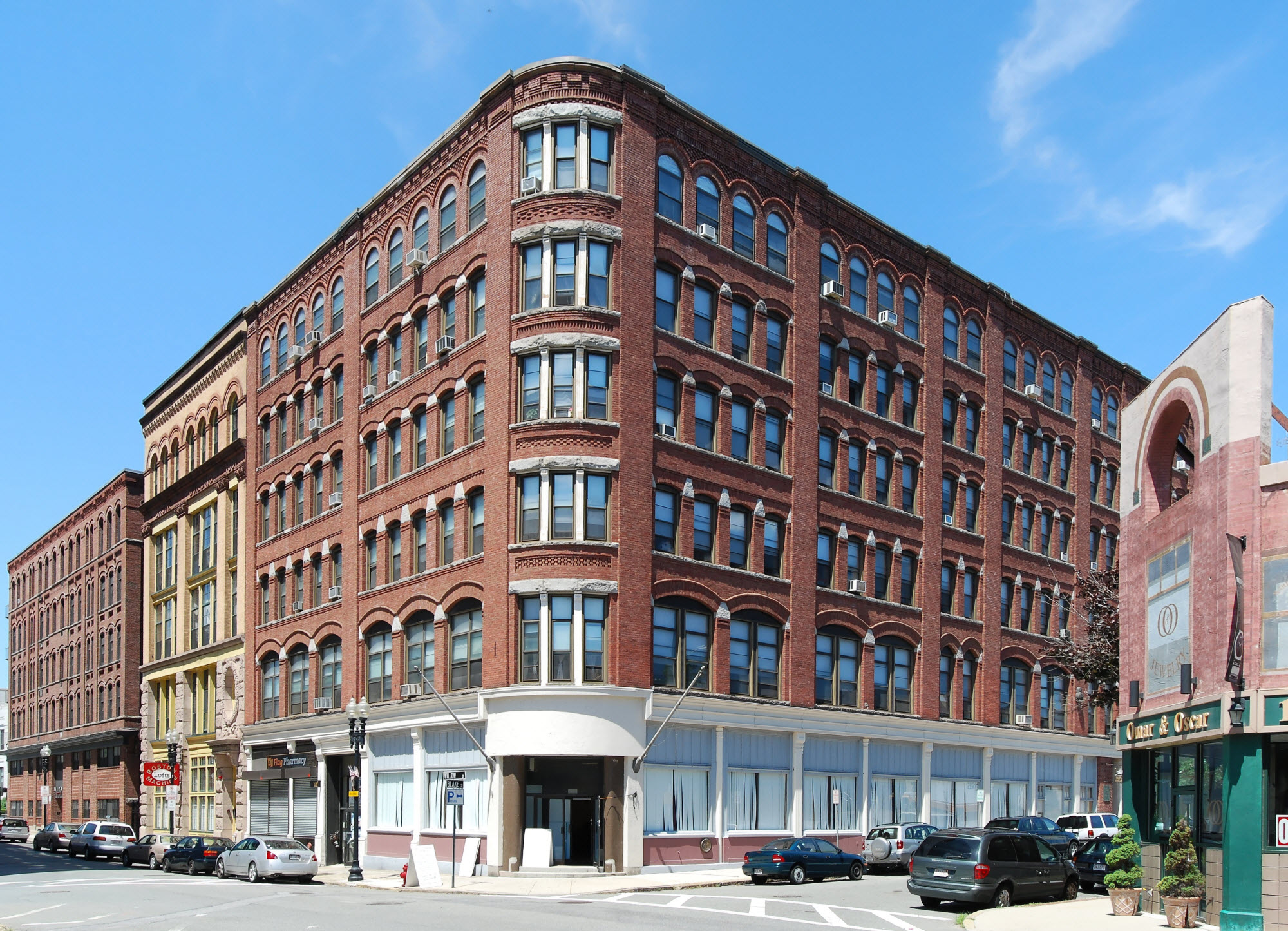
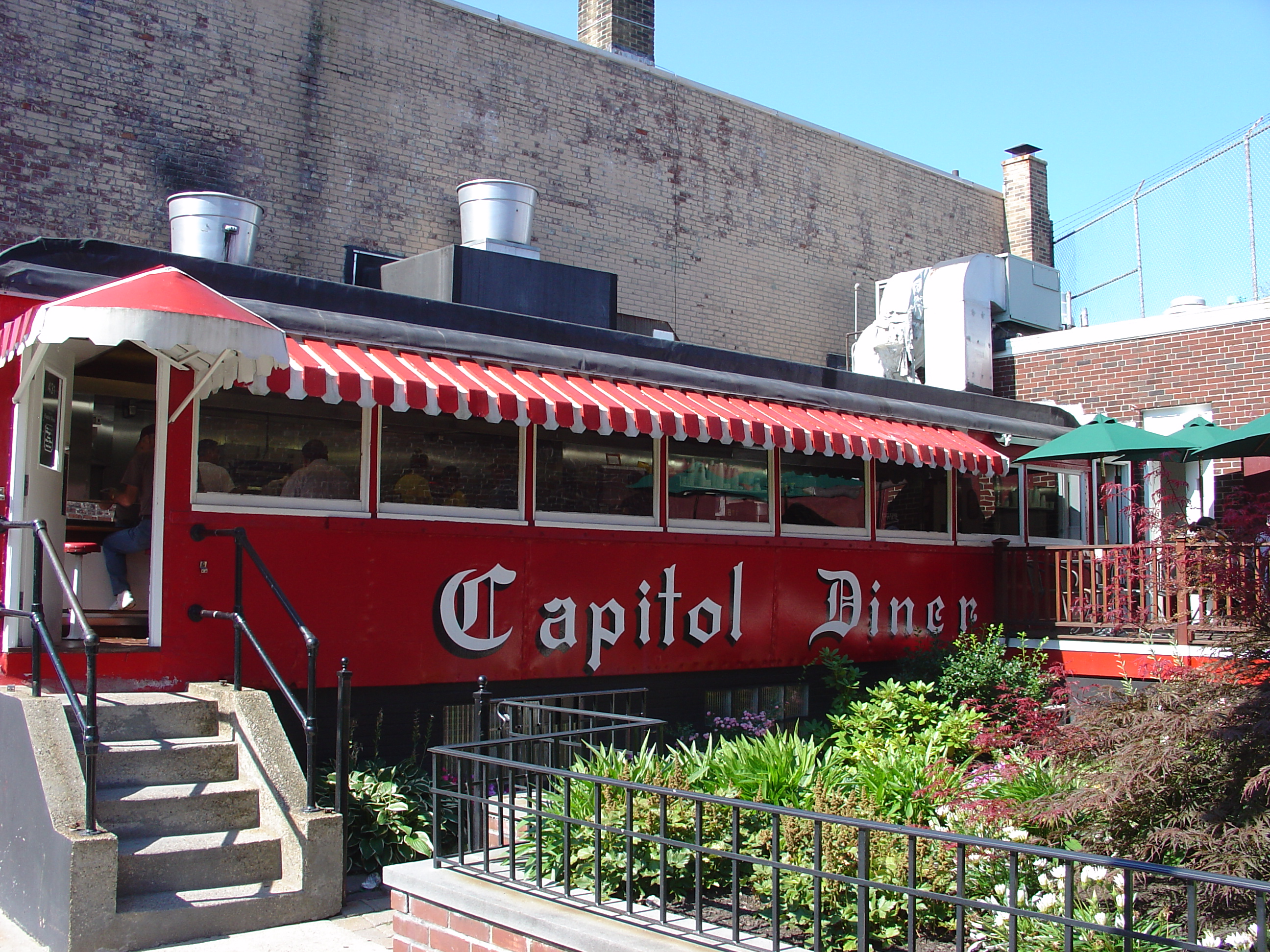
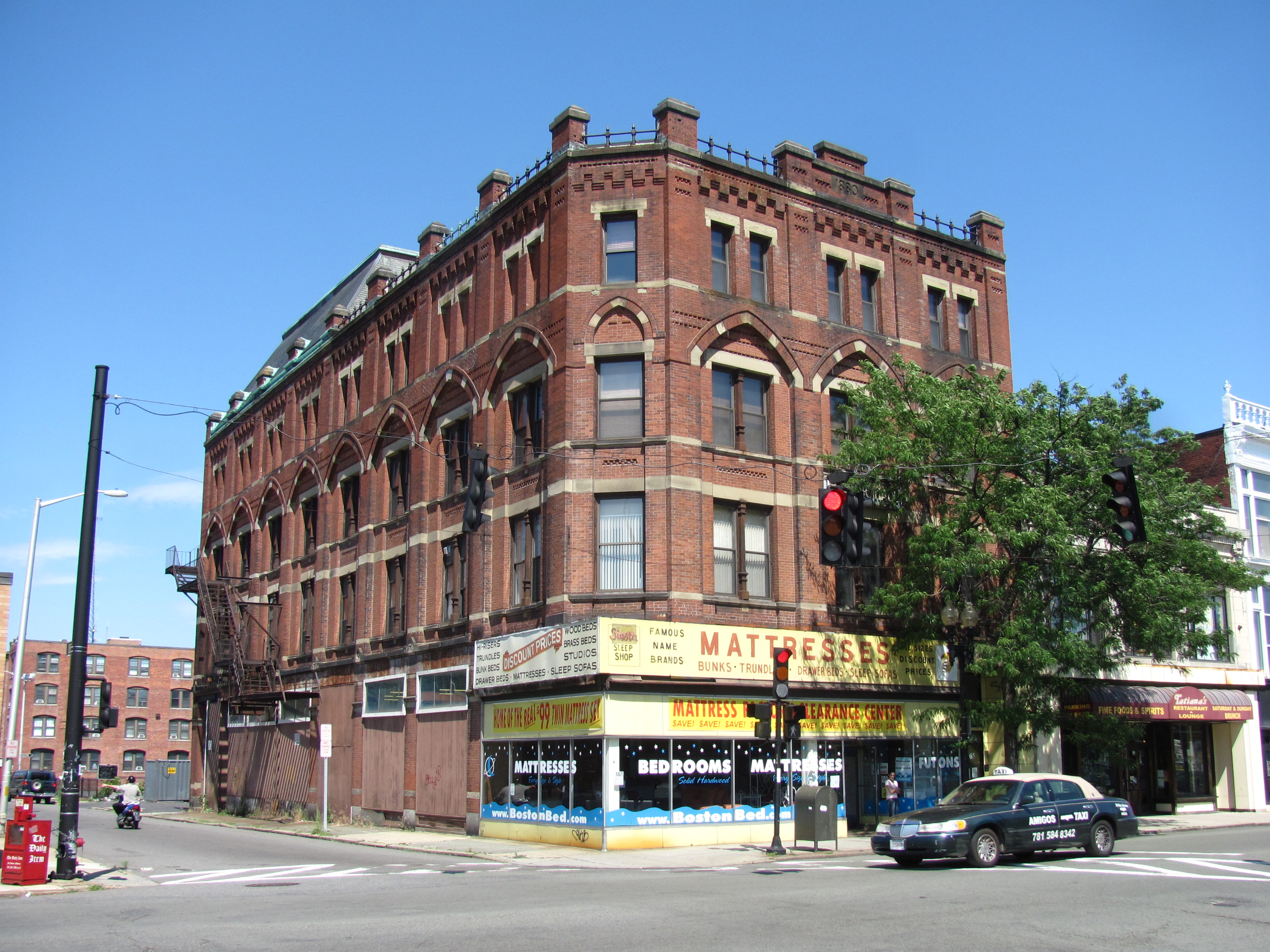
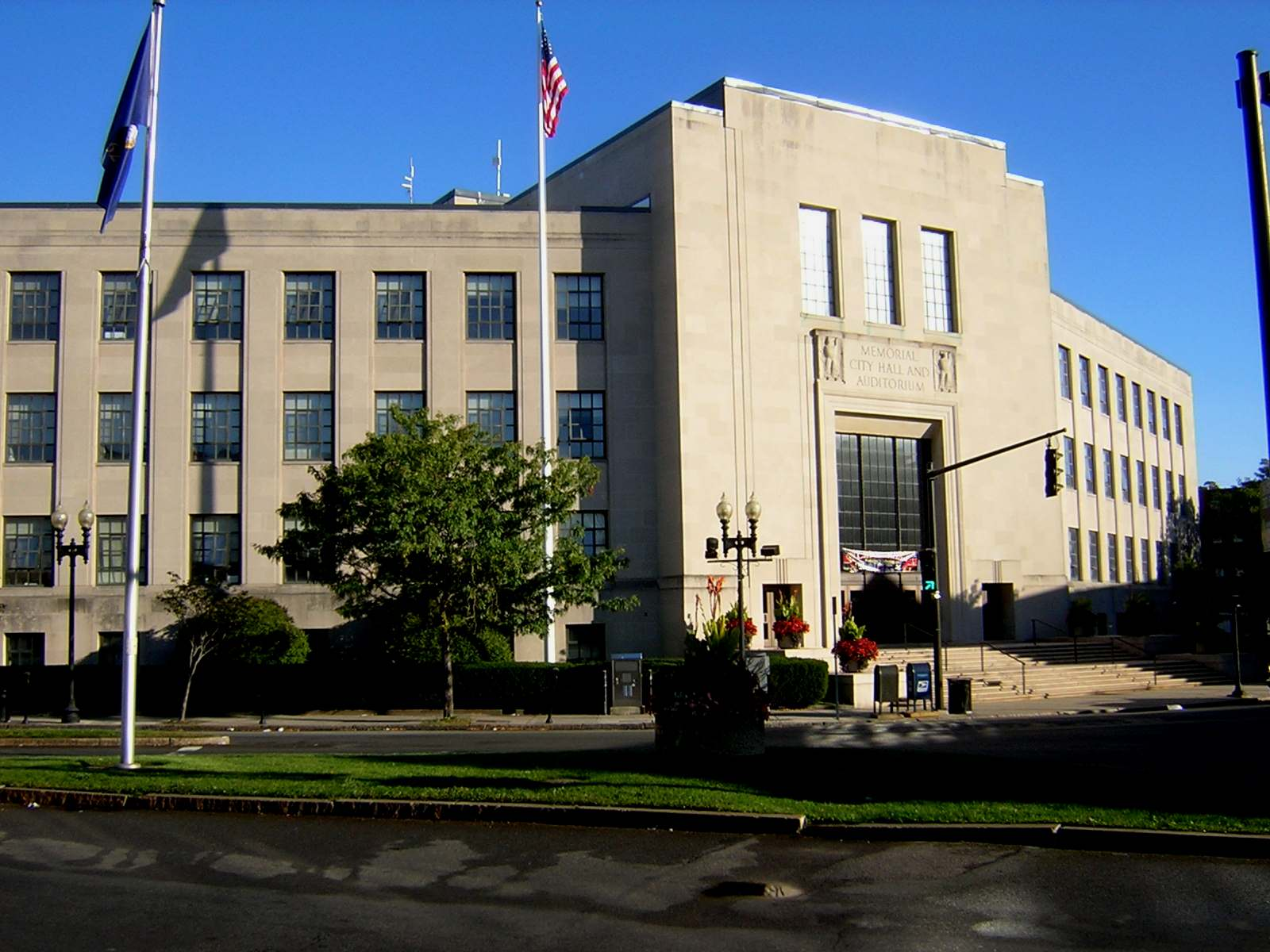
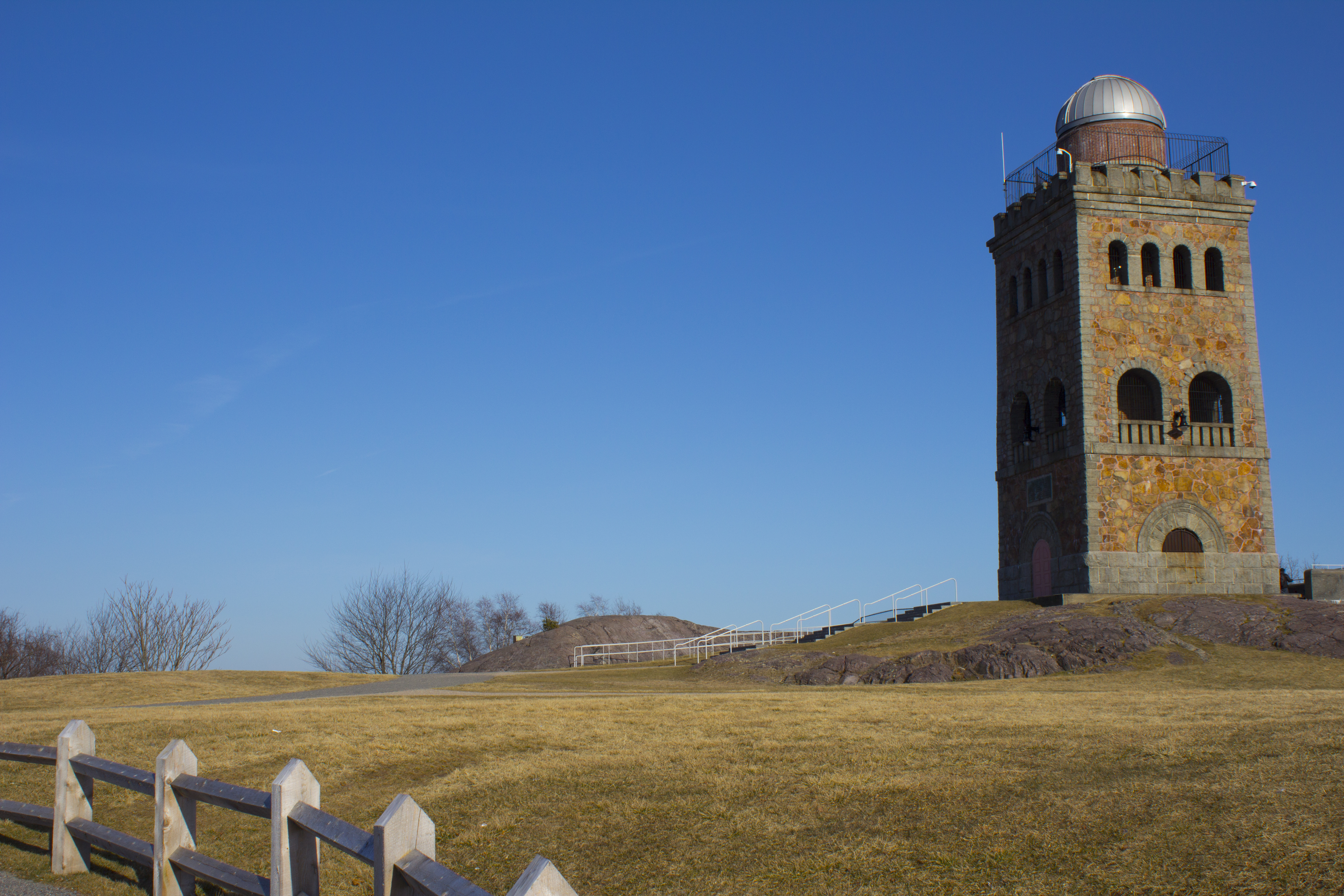
- Central Square Mowers' Block Capitol Diner Lynn Masonic Hall Lynn Memorial City Hall and Auditorium High Rock Tower Reservation

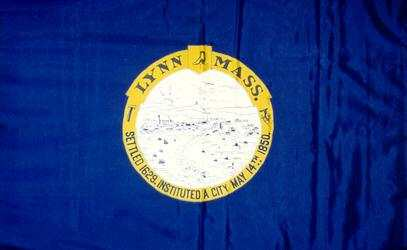
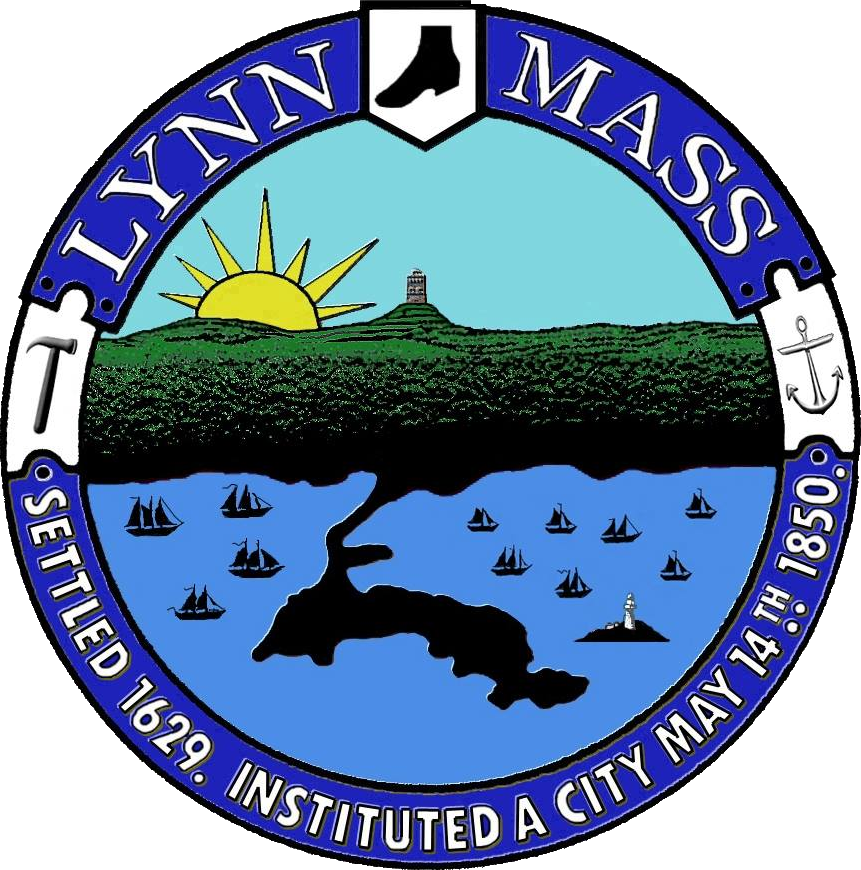
- Flag Seal
- Nicknames: "City of Sin" and "City of Firsts"
- Location in Essex County and Massachusetts.

- Location in the United States
- Coordinates: 42°28′N 70°57′W
- Country: United States
- State: Massachusetts
- County: Essex
- Settled: 1629
- Incorporated (Town): 1629
- Named: 1637
- Incorporated (City): May 14, 1850
- Named for: King's Lynn

Government
  - Type: Mayor-council city
  - Body: Executive Branch (Mayor) and Legislative Branch (City Council)
  - Mayor: Jared C. Nicholson (D)
  - Council: Constantino "Coco" Alinsug (President, (Ward 3) (D); Fred Hogan (Vice President, Ward 6) (D); Brian M. Field (at-large) (D); Brian P. LaPierre (at-large) (D); Hong L. Net (at-large) (D); Nicole McClain (at-large) (D); Peter Meaney (Ward 1) (D); Obed Matul (Ward 2) (D); Natasha Megie-Maddrey (Ward 4) (D); Cardeliz Paez (Ward 5) (D); Jordan avery (Ward 7) (D)

Area
  - Total: 13.52 sq mi (35.02 km^{2})
  - Land: 10.74 sq mi (27.81 km^{2})
  - Water: 2.78 sq mi (7.20 km^{2})
- Elevation: 30 ft (9 m)

Population (2020)
  - Total: 101,253
  - Density: 9,428.6/sq mi (3,640.41/km^{2})
- Demonym: Lynner
- Time zone: UTC−5 (Eastern)
  - Summer (DST): UTC−4 (Eastern)
- ZIP Codes: 01901–01905
- Area codes: 339/781
- FIPS code: 25-37490
- GNIS feature ID: 0613376
- Website: www.lynnma.gov

Lynn is the eighth-largest municipality in Massachusetts, United States, and the largest city in Essex County. Situated on the Atlantic Ocean, 3.7 miles (6.0 km) north of the Boston city line at Suffolk Downs, Lynn is part of Greater Boston's urban inner core and is a major economic and cultural center of the North Shore.

Settled by Europeans in 1629, Lynn is the 5th oldest colonial settlement in the Commonwealth. An early industrial center, Lynn was long colloquially referred to as the "City of Sin", owing to its historical reputation for crime and vice. In the 21st-century, however, the city is known for its immigrant population, historic architecture, downtown cultural district, loft-style apartments, and public parks and open spaces, which include the oceanfront Lynn Shore Reservation; the 2,200-acre, Frederick Law Olmsted-designed Lynn Woods Reservation; and the High Rock Reservation and Park designed by Olmsted's sons. Lynn also is home to Lynn Heritage State Park, the southernmost portion of the Essex Coastal Scenic Byway, and the seaside, National Register-listed Diamond Historic District. The population was 101,253 at the 2020 United States census.

== History ==
=== Indigenous ===
The area that is now known as Lynn was inhabited for thousands of years by Native Americans prior to English colonization in the 1600s. At the time of European contact, the area today known as Lynn was primarily inhabited by the Naumkeag people under the powerful sachem Nanepashemet who controlled territory from the Mystic to the Merrimack Rivers. Colonists would not establish a legal agreement with the Naumkeag over the use of their land in Lynn until 1686 after a smallpox epidemic in 1633, King Philip's War, and missionary efforts significantly reduced their numbers and confined them to the Praying town of Natick.

=== 17th century ===
English colonists settled Lynn not long after the 1607 establishment of Jamestown, Virginia and the 1620 arrival of the Mayflower at Plymouth. European settlement of the area was begun in 1629 by Edmund Ingalls, followed by John Tarbox of Lancashire in 1631. The area today encompassing Lynn was originally incorporated in 1629 as Saugus, the Massachusett name for the area. Three years after the settlement in Salem, five families moved onto Naumkeag lands in the interior of Lynn, then known as Saugus, and the Tomlin family constructed a large mill between today's Sluice and Flax Ponds. The mill not only supplied grains and sustenance for the settlers and trade with the Naumkeag people, but was used to create brews and many fermented casks of hops and wines to send back to King George in England.

Lynn takes its name from King's Lynn, Norfolk, England, in honor of Reverend Samuel Whiting (Senior), Lynn's first official minister who arrived from King's Lynn in 1637.

As English settlement pushed deeper into Naumkeag territories, disease, missionary efforts, and loss of access to seasonal hunting, farming, and fishing grounds caused significant disruption to Naumkeag lifeways. In 1675, Naumkeag sachem Wenepoykin joined Metacomet in resisting English colonization in King Philip's War, for which he was enslaved and sent to Barbados. In 1686, under pressure to demonstrate legal title for lands they occupied during the administrative restructuring of the Dominion of New England, the selectmen of Lynn and Reading purchased a deed from Wenopoykin's heirs Kunkshamooshaw and Quonopohit for 16 pounds of sterling silver, though by this time they and most surviving Naumkeag were residents of the Natick Praying Town.

Further European settlement of Lynn led to several independent towns being formed, with Reading created in 1644; Lynnfield in 1782; Saugus in 1815; Swampscott in 1852; and Nahant in 1853. The City of Lynn was incorporated on May 14, 1850.

Colonial Lynn was an early center of tannery and shoe-making, which began in 1635. The boots worn by Continental Army soldiers during the Revolutionary War were made in Lynn, and the shoe-making industry drove the city's growth into the early nineteenth century. This legacy is reflected in the city's seal, which features a colonial boot.

=== 19th century ===
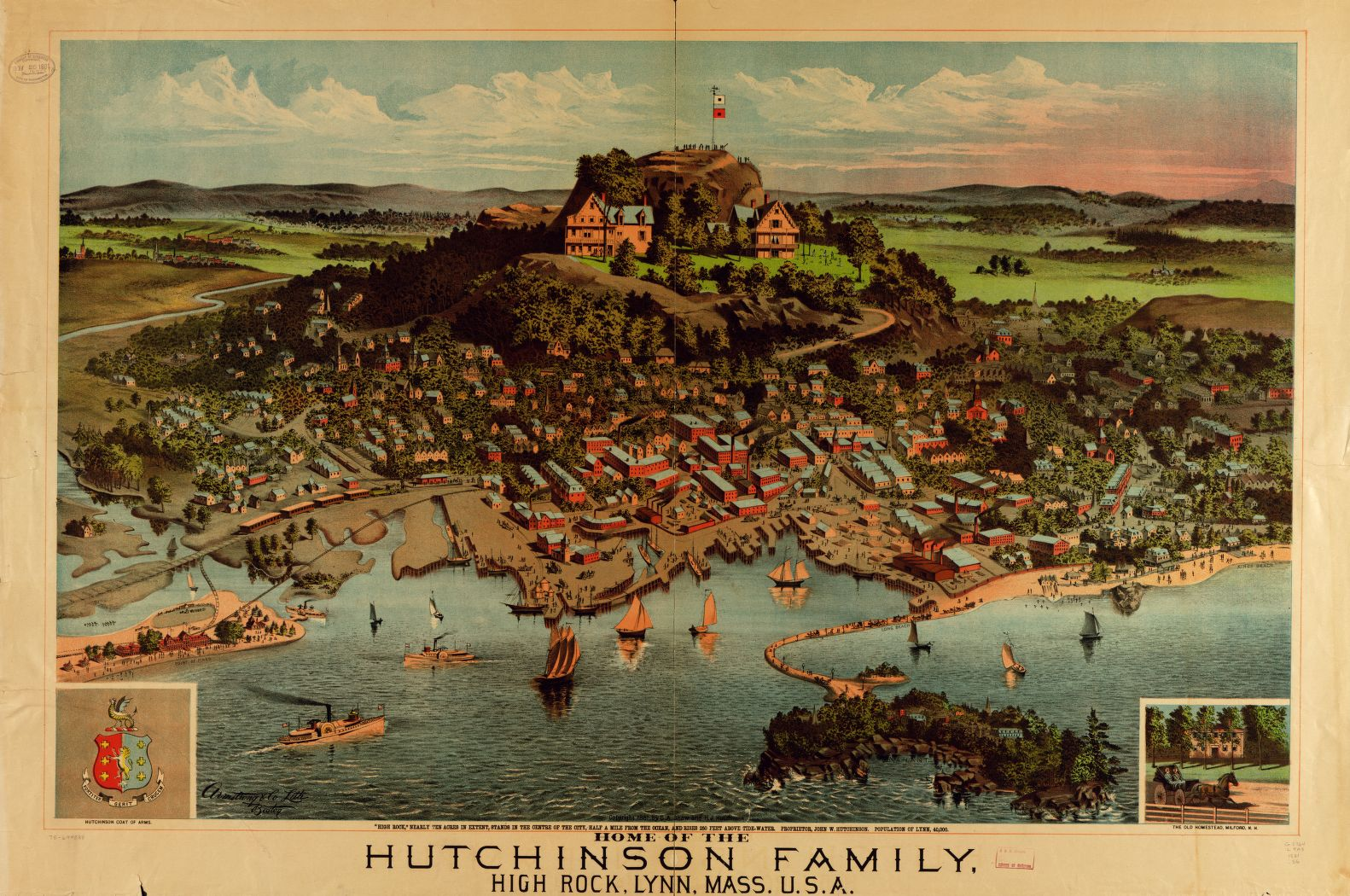
Aerial Illustration of Lynn, c. 1881

In 1816, a mail stage coach was operating through Lynn. By 1836, 23 stage coaches left the Lynn Hotel for Boston each day. The Eastern Railroad Line between Salem and East Boston opened on August 28, 1838. This was later merged with the Boston and Maine Railroad and called the Eastern Division. In 1847 telegraph wires passed through Lynn, but no telegraph service station was built until 1858.

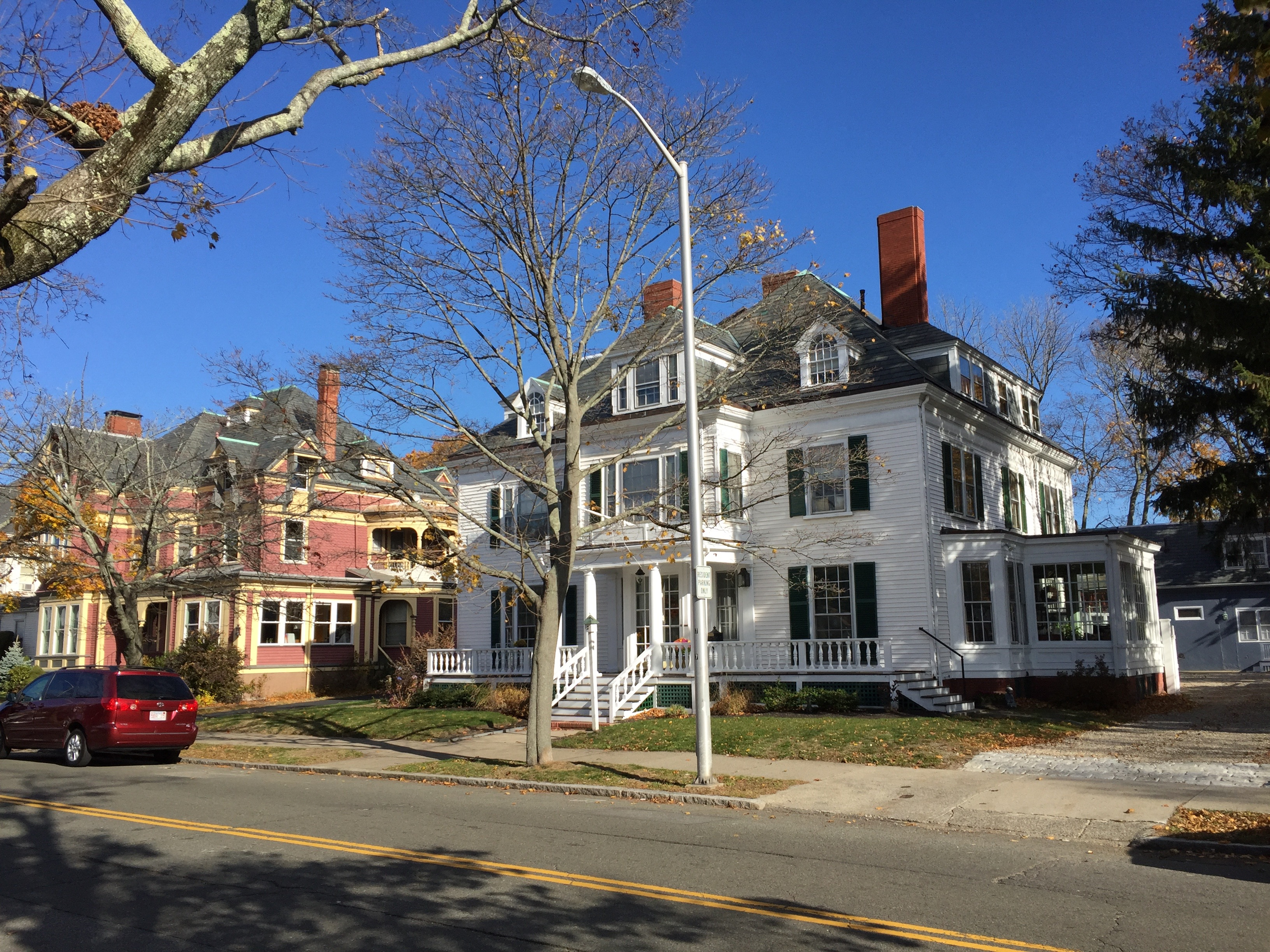
Nahant Street in Diamond Historic District

During the middle of the nineteenth century, estates and beach cottages were constructed along Lynn's shoreline, and the city's Atlantic coastline became a fashionable summer resort. Many of the structures built during this period are today situated within the National Register-listed Diamond Historic District.

Further inland, industrial activity contemporaneously expanded in Lynn. Shoe manufacturers, led by Charles A. Coffin and Silas Abbott Barton, invested in the early electric industry, specifically in 1883 with Elihu Thomson, Edwin J. Houston, and their Thomson-Houston Electric Company. That company merged with Edison Electric Company of Schenectady, New York, forming General Electric in 1892, with the two original GE plants being in Lynn and Schenectady. Coffin served as the first president of General Electric.

Initially the General Electric plant specialized in arc lights, electric motors, and meters. Later it specialized in aircraft electrical systems and components, and aircraft engines were built in Lynn during WWII. That engine plant evolved into the current jet engine plant during WWII because of research contacts at MIT in Cambridge. Gerhard Neumann was a key player in jet engine group at GE in Lynn. The continuous interaction of material science research at MIT and the resulting improvements in jet engine efficiency and power have kept the jet engine plant in Lynn ever since.

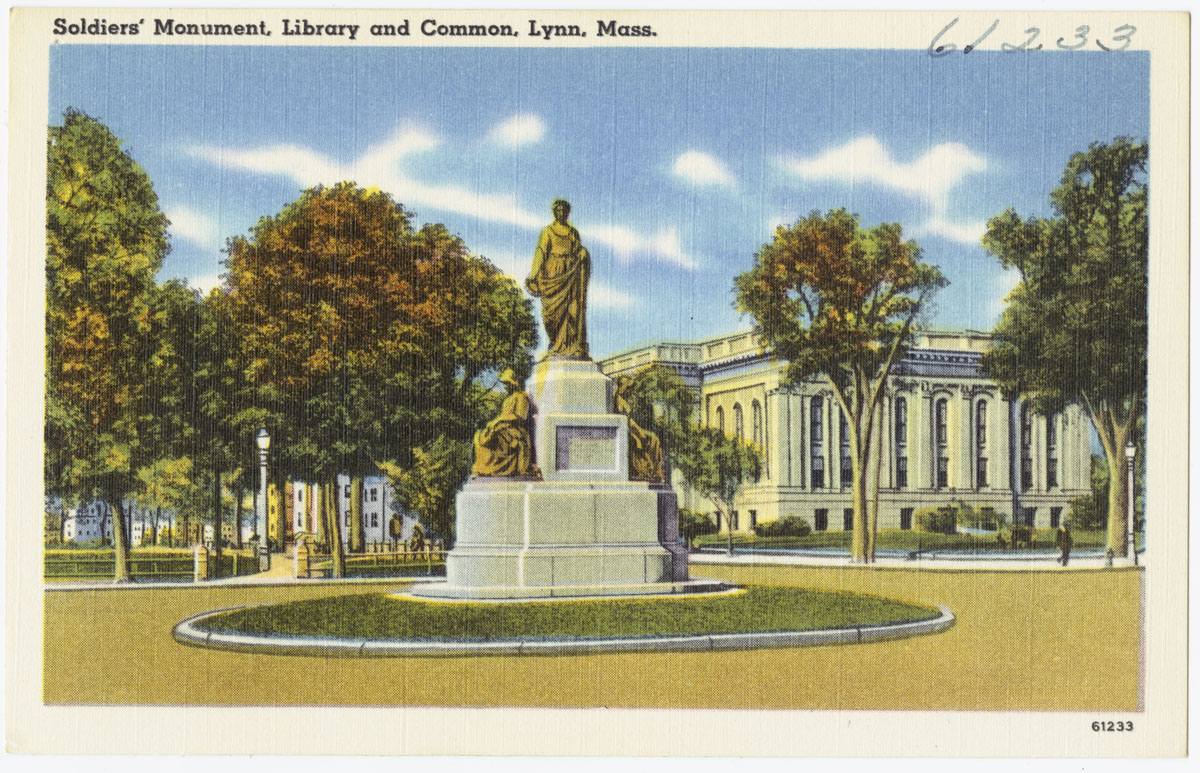
Postcard depicting a soldier monument in Lynn, MA

One of the largest strikes of the early labor movement began in the shoe factories of Lynn on February 22, 1860, when Lynn shoemakers marched through the streets to their workplaces and handed in their tools, protesting reduced wages. Known as the 1860 New England Shoemakers Strike, it was one of the earliest strikes of its kind in the United States.

In 1841, abolitionist Frederick Douglass, moved to Lynn as a fugitive slave. Douglass wrote his first autobiography, Narrative of the Life of Frederick Douglass, an American Slave, while living in Lynn. The publication would become Douglass's best-known work. Douglass, his wife, and their five children lived in Lynn until 1848.

In 1870, Esther Hill Hawks, a renowned female physician and activist during the American Civil War, moved to Lynn, becoming one of the three first female physicians there, and provided her gynecology services to many women. In 1874, she opened her own practice.

On February 1, 1866, Mary Baker Eddy experienced the "fall in Lynn", in which Eddy was badly injured but reportedly healed herself through prayer alone. This was a significant milestone in the development of the Christian Science religion.

In 1889 a massive fire swept through the downtown of Lynn, and would not be matched in size until nearly 100 years later. At the time the loss was the third largest from fire in New England history. A total of 296 building were destroyed, including 142 homes, 25 stores, the Central Square railroad depot, four banks and four newspaper buildings. It was estimated that 200 families were made homeless and 10,000 jobs were lost. Estimates put the total loss as high as $6,000,000 (equivalent to about $215,000,000 in 2025).

=== 20th century ===
Lynn experienced a wave of immigration during the late 1800s and early 1900s. During the 30 years between 1885 and 1915, Lynn's immigrant population increased from 9,800 to 29,500, representing nearly one-third of the city's total population. Polish and Russian Jews were the largest single group, numbering more than 6,000. The first Jewish settlers in Lynn, a group of twenty Hasidic European families, mostly from Russia, formed the Congregation Anshai Sfard, a Hasidic Jewish synagogue in 1888.

Catholic churches catering to the needs of specific language and ethnic groups also testify to the waves of immigrants. St. Jean Baptiste parish, eventually including a grammar school and high school, was founded in 1886, primarily for French-Canadians. Holy Family Church conducted services in Italian beginning in 1922, and St. Michael's church also provided church services and a grammar school for the Polish-speaking community, beginning in 1906. St. Patrick's church and school was a focus of the Irish-American community in Lynn. St. George's Greek Orthodox Church was founded in Lynn in 1905. Later in the 20th century, the city became an important center of greater Boston's Latino community. Additionally, several thousand Cambodians settled in Lynn between 1975 and 1979 and in the early 1980s.

At the beginning of the 20th century, Lynn was the world-leader in the production of shoes. 234 factories produced more than a million pairs of shoes each day, thanks in part to mechanization of the process by an African-American immigrant named Jan Ernst Matzeliger. From 1924 until 1974, the Lynn Independent Industrial Shoemaking School operated in the city. However, production declined throughout the 20th century, and the last shoe factory closed in 1981.

In the early 1900s, the Metropolitan District Commission acquired several coastal properties in Lynn and Nahant, in order to create Lynn Shore and Nahant Beach Reservations, and to construct adjoining Lynn Shore Drive. When it opened to the public in 1910, Lynn Shore Drive catalyzed new development along Lynn's coastline, yielding many of the early 20th century structures that constitute a majority of the contributing resources found in the National Register-listed Diamond Historic District.

On January 20, 1942, a fire swept through the Melvin Hall Apartments on Spring Street, resulting in the deaths of 13 occupants.

In 1970, Massachusetts authorized rent control in municipalities with more than 50,000 residents. Voters in Lynn, Somerville, Brookline, and Cambridge subsequently adopted rent control. Voters in Lynn approved a measure to continue rent control measures, which had been in place since February 1972, on November 7, 1972, by a 22,229 to 15,568 margin. On June 4, 1974, the city council, led by mayor David L. Phillips, voted 7–4 in favor of abolishing the existing rent control measures, replacing them with a "Rent Grievance and Elderly Assistance Board."

During the late 1970s and early 1980s, Lynn suffered several large fires. On November 28, 1981, a devastating inferno engulfed several former shoe factories, located at Broad and Washington Streets. Seventeen downtown buildings were destroyed in less than twelve hours, with property losses estimated to be totaling at least $35,000,000 (equivalent to about $123,950,000 in 2025). At least 18 businesses were affected, resulting in the estimated loss of 1,500 jobs. The Lynn campus of the North Shore Community College, planning for which was already underway at the time of the fire, now occupies much of the burned area.

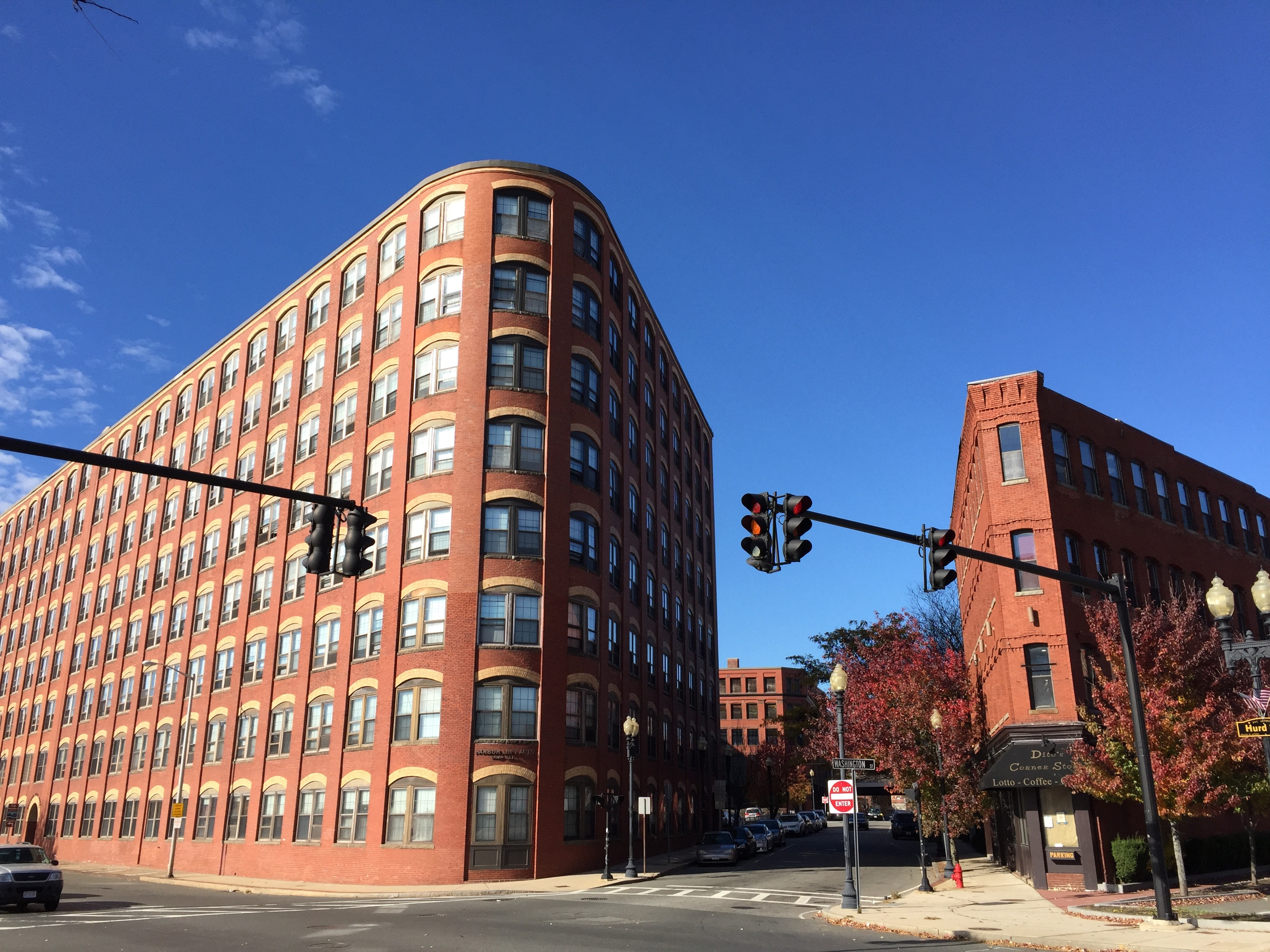
Lynn Washington Street at Broad Street

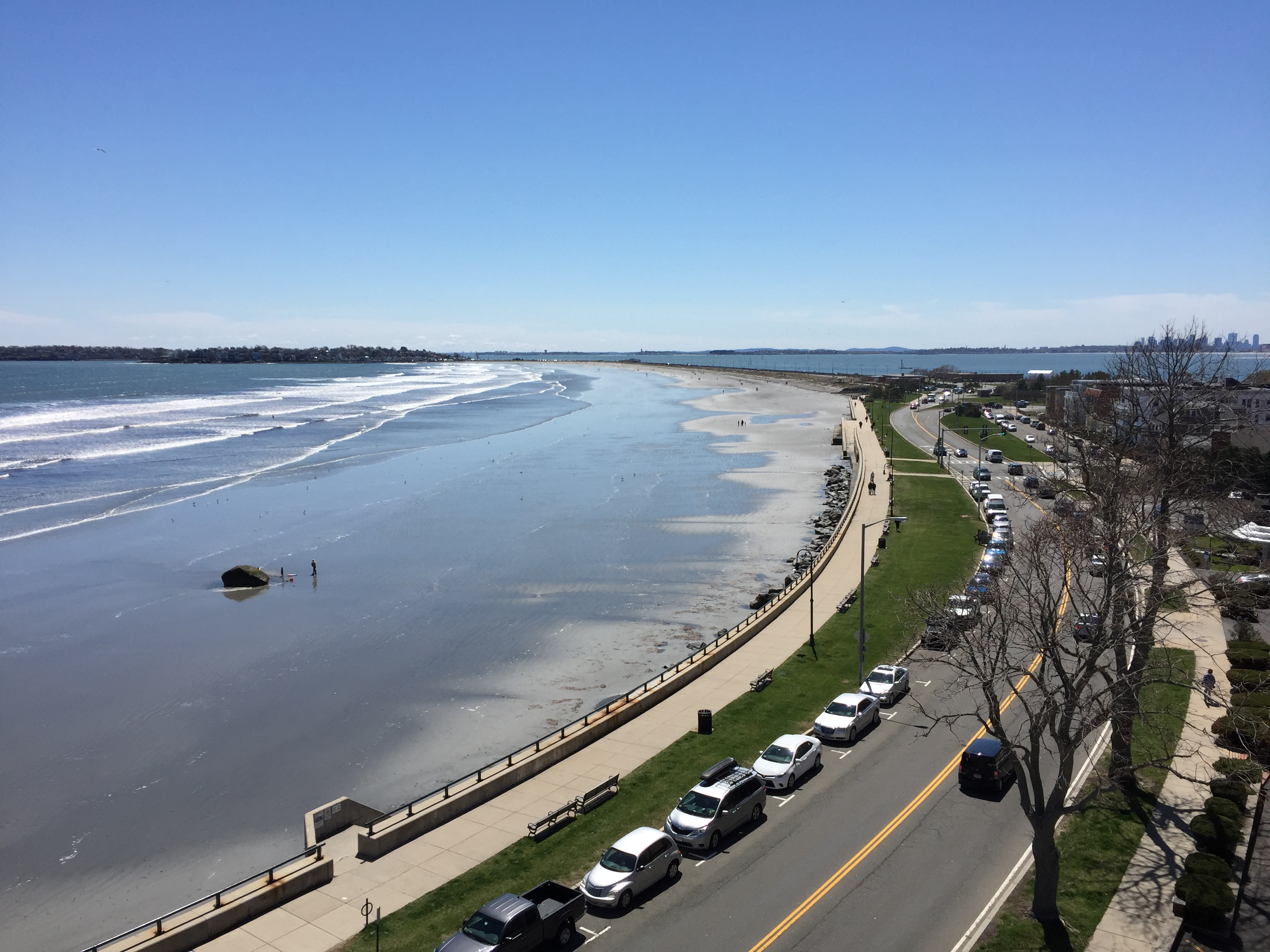
View over Lynn Shore Drive to Nahant and Boston

Some data suggest a reputation for crime and vice in Lynn.

In order to counter its reputation as "the city of sin", Lynn launched a "City Of Firsts" advertising campaign in the early 1990s, which promoted Lynn as having:

- First iron works (1643)
- First fire engine (1654)
- First electric streetcar to operate in Massachusetts (November 19, 1888)
- First American jet engine
- First woman in advertising & mass-marketing – Lydia Pinkham
- First baseball game under artificial light
- First dance academy in the U.S.
- First tannery in the U.S.
- First air mail transport in New England, from Saugus, MA to Lynn, MA
- First roast beef sandwich
- First tulip in the United States, at the Fay Estate near Spring Pond

In a further effort to rebrand the municipality, city solicitor Michael Barry proposed renaming the city Ocean Park in 1997, but the initiative was unsuccessful.

Despite losing much of its industrial base during the 20th century, Lynn remained home to many companies, such as:

- A division of General Electric Aviation, focused on manufacturing jet engines
- West Lynn Creamery (now part of Dean Foods's Garelick Farms unit)
- C. L. Hauthaway & Sons, a polymer producer
- Old Neighborhood Foods, a meat packer
- Lynn Manufacturing, a maker of combustion chambers for the oil and gas heating industry
- Sterling Machine Co.
- Durkee-Mower, makers of "Marshmallow Fluff"

=== 21st century ===
In the early 2000s, the renovation and adaptive re-use of downtown historic structures, together with new construction, launched a revitalization of Lynn, which remains ongoing. Arts, culture, and entertainment have been at the forefront of this revitalization, with new arts organizations, cultural venues, public art projects, and restaurants emerging in the downtown area. In 2012, the Massachusetts Cultural Council named downtown Lynn one of the first state-recognized arts and culture districts in Massachusetts.

In 2015, Massachusetts Governor Charlie Baker established a task force, composed of representatives of multiple state and municipal public agencies, to further Lynn's revitalization.

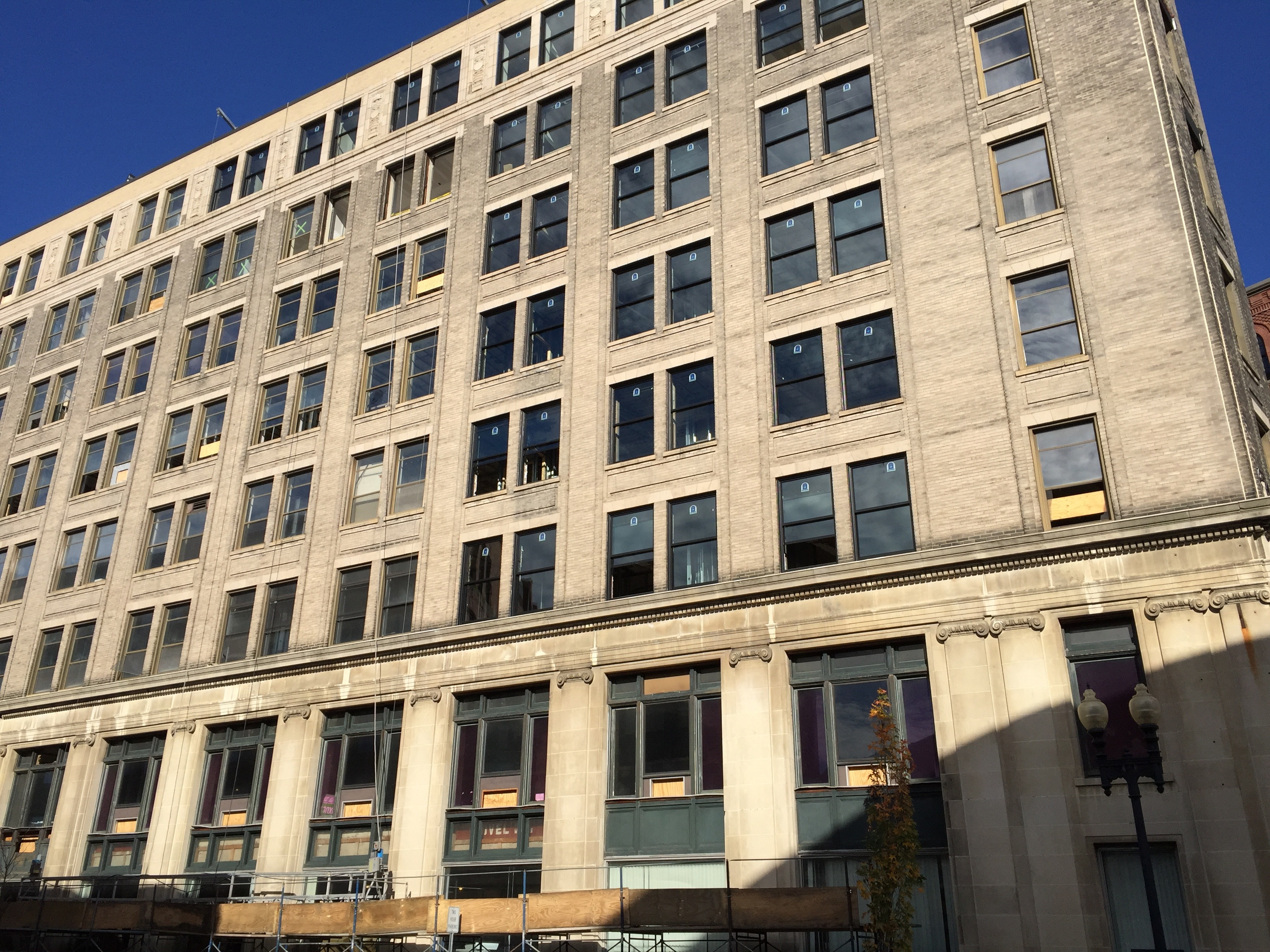
Lynn "Flatiron" Building Undergoing Conversion to Loft Apartments, November 2016

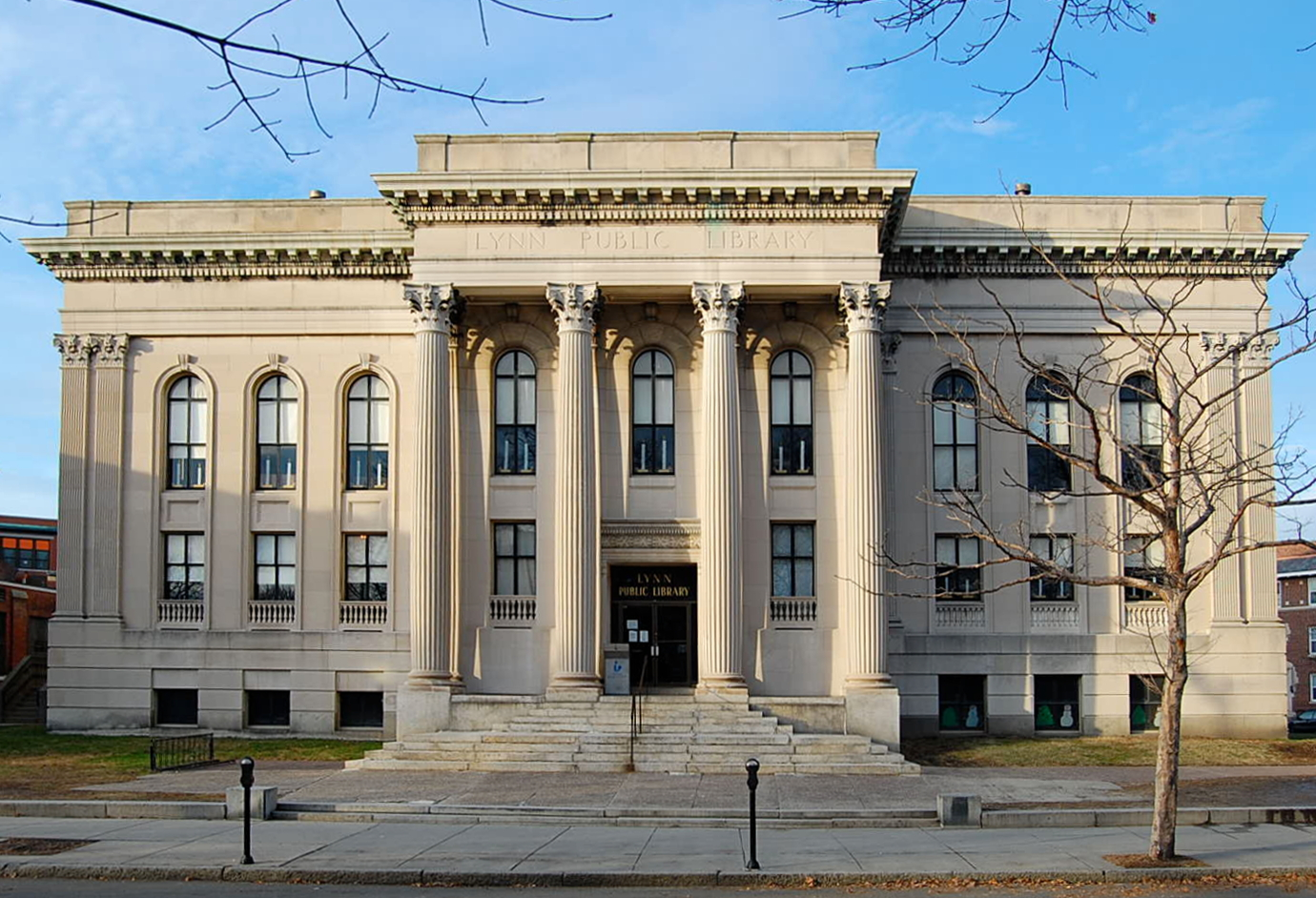
Public Library

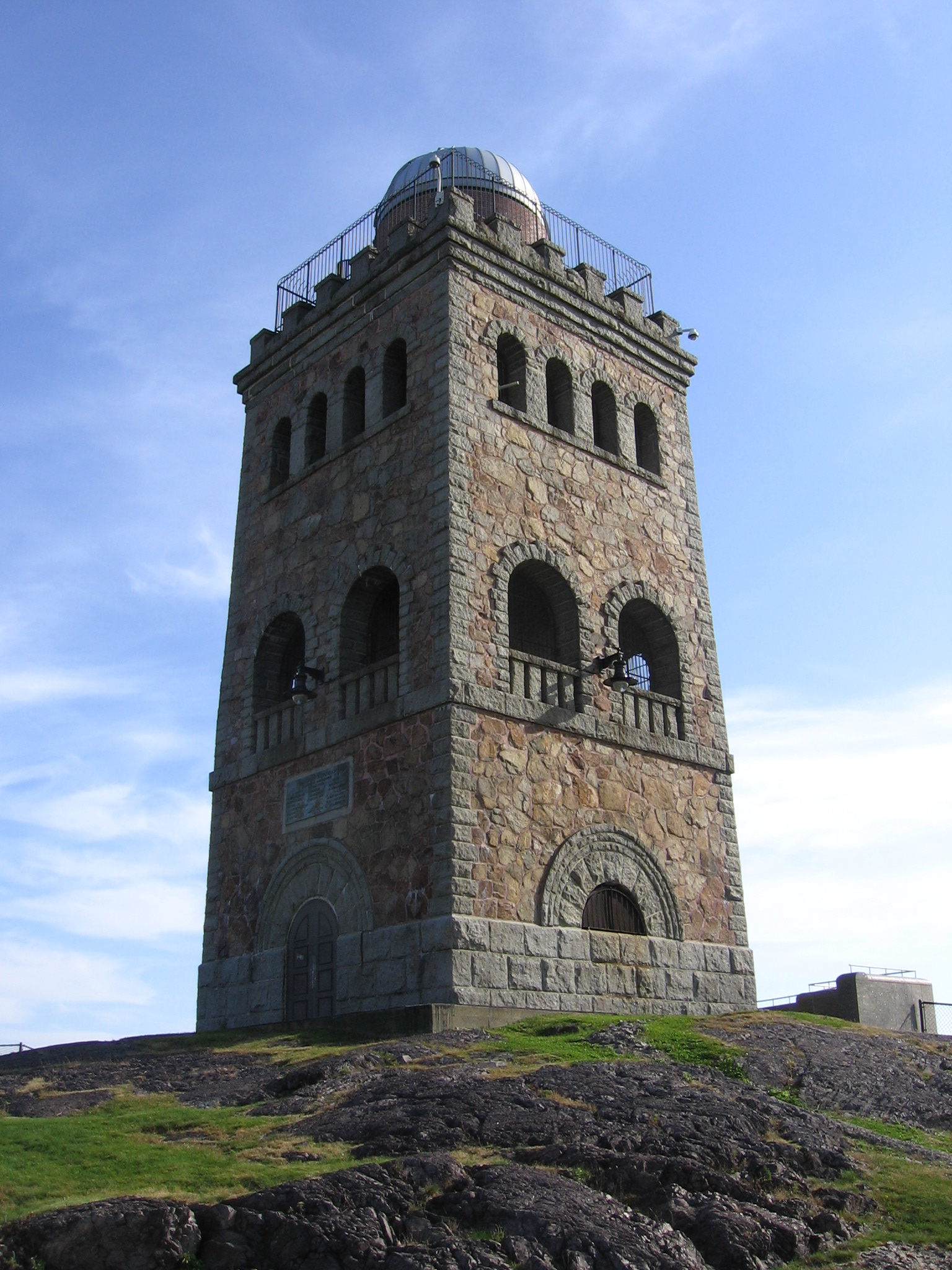
High Rock Tower Reservation

Formerly vacant industrial buildings continue to be converted into loft spaces, and historic homes, particularly Lynn's Diamond Historic District, are being restored. In 2016, several large land parcels in Lynn were acquired by major developers. In November 2018, construction began on downtown Lynn's first luxury midrise—a 259-unit, 10-story building on Monroe Street. in December 2019, ground was broken on a 331-unit waterfront development on Carroll Parkway. Many of the recent and pending large real estate projects in Lynn are Transit-oriented developments, sited within a half-mile of Lynn station, which provides 20-minute train service to North Station.

Lynn's revitalization has been bolstered by the city's emergence as a center of creative placemaking.

In 2017, swaths of the city's downtown were transformed by a series of large-scale murals, painted on buildings by local, national, and international artists, as part of the city's inaugural Beyond Walls festival. Light-based interventions, including projections onto High Rock Tower, the installation of vintage neon signs on downtown buildings, and large-scale LED-illuminations of the Massachusetts Bay Transportation Authority rail underpasses bisecting Lynn's Downtown, also have been deployed. In 2017, Mount Vernon Street, in the core of the downtown Central Square area, began to host block parties, food trucks, and other special events.

In recent years, Lynn has attracted a substantial and growing LGBT population.

In April 2018, The Boston Globe named Lynn one of the "Top spots to live in Greater Boston in 2018."

On August 18, 2021, the new Frederick Douglass Park on Exchange Street was dedicated, directly across the street from the site of the Central Square railroad depot where Douglass was forcibly removed from the train in 1841. The park features a bronze bas-relief sculpture of Douglass. The park had been in the works since at least 2019 when a bill was filed in the Massachusetts Senate to designate the park area and its management by the Massachusetts DCR.

On September 16, 2021, Mayor McGee introduced Vision Lynn, a 20-year comprehensive planning project to expand Lynn's diversity and improve infrastructure further. In the following year and a half, Lynn's Planning Department held many opportunities for Lynners to discuss what they see for the future of the city. On April 10, 2023, a draft of the plan was shared on the planning departments website to allow for greater public comment. After May 15, 2023, the public comment window will be closed and the committee will release a final draft to be endorsed and adopted by the city.

Lynn earned the moniker "Condom Capital of the USA" after Global Protection, a subsidiary of Karex, the world's largest condom manufacturer, relocated to the former Garelick Farms facility.

=== Top employers ===
| # | Employer | # of employees |
|---|---|---|
| 1 | GE Aerospace | 2,500 |
| 2 | Lynn Public Schools | 1,243 |
| 3 | North Shore Community College | 991 |
| 4 | All Care VNA | 630 |
| 5 | Eastern Bank | 500 |
| 6 | Kettle Cuisine | 500 |

== Geography ==
According to the United States Census Bureau, the city has a total area of 13.5 square miles (35 km^{2}), of which 10.8 square miles (28 km^{2}) is land and 2.7 square miles (7.0 km^{2}) (19.87%) is water. Lynn is located beside Massachusetts Bay and the Atlantic Ocean. Lynn's shoreline is divided in half by the town of Nahant, which divides Lynn Harbor to the south from Nahant Bay to the north. The city lies north of the Saugus River, and is also home to several brooks, as well as several ponds, the largest being Breed's Pond and Walden Pond (which has no relation to a similarly named pond in Concord). More than one-quarter of the town's land is covered by the Lynn Woods Reservation, which takes up much of the land in the northwestern part of the city. The city is also home to two beaches, Lynn Beach and King's Beach, both of which lie along Nahant Bay, as well as a boat ramp in Lynn Harbor.

Lynn is located in the southern part of Essex County and is 10 miles (16 km) northeast of Boston and 22 miles (35 km) west-southwest of Cape Ann. The city is bordered by Nahant to the southeast, Swampscott to the east, Salem to the northeast, Peabody to the north, Lynnfield to the northwest, Saugus to the west and Revere (in Suffolk County) to the south. Lynn's water rights extend into Nahant Bay and share Lynn Harbor with Nahant. There is no land connection to Revere; the only connection is the General Edwards Bridge across the Pines River. Besides its downtown district, Lynn is also divided into East Lynn and West Lynn, which are further divided into even smaller areas.

Lynn is loosely segmented into the following neighborhoods:

Central:

- Downtown / Business District
- Central Square

West Lynn:

- Pine Hill
- McDonough Sq./ Barry Park
- Tower Hill / Austin Sq. – Saugus River
- The Commons
- The Brickyard
- Walnut St./Lynnhurst
- Veteran's Village

East Lynn:

- Diamond District / Lynn Shore
- Wyoma Sq.
- The Highlands
- The Fay Estates
- Ward 1 / Lynnfield St.
- Goldfish Pond
- The Meadow / Keaney Park

=== Climate ===
Lynn experiences cold, snowy winters and warm, humid summers. The climate is similar to that of Boston.

According to the Köppen climate classification, Lynn has either a humid subtropical climate (abbreviated Cfa), or a hot-summer humid continental climate (abbreviated Dfa), depending on the isotherm used.

Climate data for Lynn, 1991–2020 simulated normals (59 ft elevation)
| Month | Jan | Feb | Mar | Apr | May | Jun | Jul | Aug | Sep | Oct | Nov | Dec | Year |
|---|---|---|---|---|---|---|---|---|---|---|---|---|---|
| Mean daily maximum °F (°C) | 36.7 (2.6) | 38.7 (3.7) | 45.1 (7.3) | 55.4 (13.0) | 64.9 (18.3) | 74.1 (23.4) | 80.1 (26.7) | 79.3 (26.3) | 73.0 (22.8) | 61.9 (16.6) | 51.6 (10.9) | 42.1 (5.6) | 58.6 (14.8) |
| Daily mean °F (°C) | 28.8 (−1.8) | 30.6 (−0.8) | 37.0 (2.8) | 47.1 (8.4) | 56.7 (13.7) | 66.0 (18.9) | 72.1 (22.3) | 71.1 (21.7) | 64.6 (18.1) | 53.6 (12.0) | 43.7 (6.5) | 34.5 (1.4) | 50.5 (10.3) |
| Mean daily minimum °F (°C) | 20.8 (−6.2) | 22.5 (−5.3) | 29.1 (−1.6) | 38.8 (3.8) | 48.6 (9.2) | 58.1 (14.5) | 64.0 (17.8) | 63.0 (17.2) | 55.9 (13.3) | 45.1 (7.3) | 35.8 (2.1) | 27.1 (−2.7) | 42.4 (5.8) |
| Average precipitation inches (mm) | 3.70 (93.96) | 3.49 (88.76) | 4.66 (118.45) | 4.24 (107.58) | 3.50 (88.79) | 4.03 (102.48) | 3.57 (90.76) | 3.45 (87.61) | 3.63 (92.08) | 4.82 (122.46) | 4.01 (101.79) | 4.74 (120.37) | 47.84 (1,215.09) |
| Average dew point °F (°C) | 18.9 (−7.3) | 19.4 (−7.0) | 24.8 (−4.0) | 34.2 (1.2) | 45.5 (7.5) | 56.1 (13.4) | 62.1 (16.7) | 61.5 (16.4) | 55.6 (13.1) | 44.6 (7.0) | 34.0 (1.1) | 25.2 (−3.8) | 40.2 (4.5) |
Source: PRISM Climate Group

== Demographics ==
Historical population
| Year | Pop. | ±% |
|---|---|---|
| 1790 | 2,291 | — |
| 1800 | 2,837 | +23.8% |
| 1810 | 4,087 | +44.1% |
| 1820 | 4,515 | +10.5% |
| 1830 | 6,138 | +35.9% |
| 1840 | 9,367 | +52.6% |
| 1850 | 14,257 | +52.2% |
| 1860 | 19,083 | +33.9% |
| 1870 | 28,233 | +47.9% |
| 1880 | 38,274 | +35.6% |
| 1890 | 55,727 | +45.6% |
| 1900 | 68,513 | +22.9% |
| 1910 | 89,336 | +30.4% |
| 1920 | 99,148 | +11.0% |
| 1930 | 102,320 | +3.2% |
| 1940 | 98,123 | −4.1% |
| 1950 | 99,738 | +1.6% |
| 1960 | 94,478 | −5.3% |
| 1970 | 90,294 | −4.4% |
| 1980 | 78,471 | −13.1% |
| 1990 | 81,245 | +3.5% |
| 2000 | 89,050 | +9.6% |
| 2010 | 90,329 | +1.4% |
| 2020 | 101,253 | +12.1% |
| 2024* | 103,489 | +2.2% |
* = population estimate. Source: United States census records and Population Estimates Program data. Source: U.S. Decennial Census

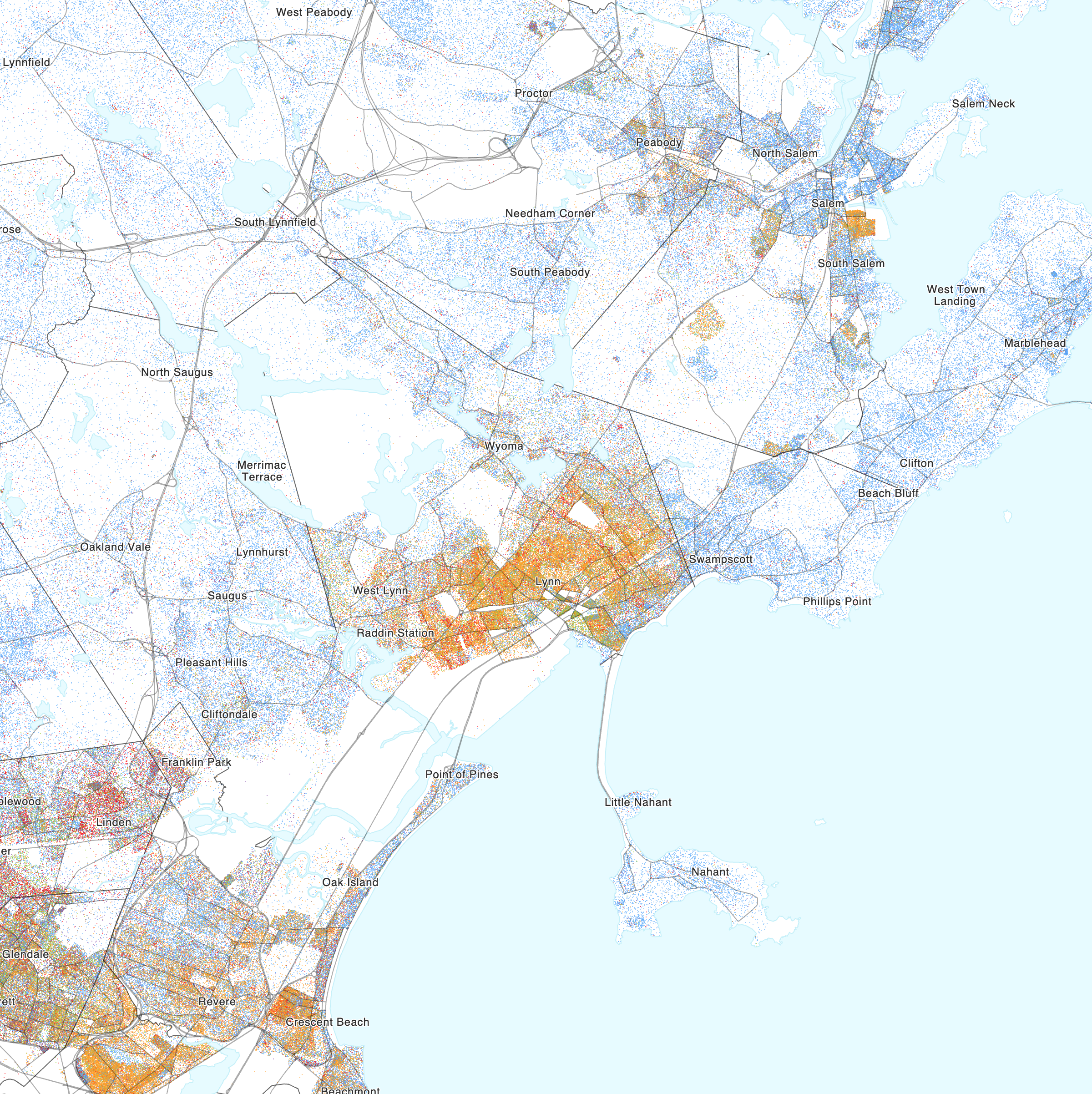
Map of racial distribution in Lynn, 2020 U.S. census. Each dot is one person: ⬤ White ⬤ Black ⬤ Asian ⬤ Hispanic ⬤ Multiracial ⬤ Native American/Other

=== 2020 census ===
Lynn, Massachusetts – Racial and ethnic composition Note: the US Census treats Hispanic/Latino as an ethnic category. This table excludes Latinos from the racial categories and assigns them to a separate category. Hispanics/Latinos may be of any race.
| Race / Ethnicity (NH = Non-Hispanic) | Pop 2000 | Pop 2010 | Pop 2020 | % 2000 | % 2010 | % 2020 |
|---|---|---|---|---|---|---|
| White alone (NH) | 55,630 | 42,969 | 34,536 | 62.47% | 47.57% | 34.11% |
| Black or African American alone (NH) | 8,165 | 9,494 | 10,735 | 9.17% | 10.51% | 10.60% |
| Native American or Alaska Native alone (NH) | 168 | 178 | 115 | 0.19% | 0.20% | 0.11% |
| Asian alone (NH) | 5,686 | 6,210 | 6,822 | 6.39% | 6.87% | 6.74% |
| Pacific Islander alone (NH) | 39 | 37 | 28 | 0.04% | 0.04% | 0.03% |
| Some Other Race alone (NH) | 349 | 407 | 1,077 | 0.39% | 0.45% | 1.06% |
| Mixed Race or Multi-Racial (NH) | 2,630 | 2,021 | 3,380 | 2.95% | 2.24% | 3.34% |
| Hispanic or Latino (any race) | 16,383 | 29,013 | 44,560 | 18.40% | 32.12% | 44.01% |
| Total | 89,050 | 90,329 | 101,253 | 100.00% | 100.00% | 100.00% |

=== 2010 census ===
As of the census of 2010, there were 90,329 people, 33,310 households, and 20,988 families residing in the city.

The racial makeup of the city was:

- 57.6% White
- 12.8% African American
- 0.7% Native American
- 7.0% Asian
- 0.1% Pacific Islander
- 16.8% from other races
- 5.0% from two or more races

Hispanic or Latino of any race were 32.1% of the population (10.5% Dominican, 6.3% Guatemalan, 5.4% Puerto Rican, 2.8% Salvadoran, 1.7% Mexican, 0.6% Honduran, 0.4% Colombian, 0.4% Spanish, 0.2% Peruvian, 0.2% Cuban).

Cambodians form the largest Asian origin group in Lynn, with 3.9% of Lynn's total population of Cambodian ancestry. Other large Asian groups are those of Vietnamese (1.0%), Indian (0.4%), Chinese (0.3%), and Laotian (0.2%) ancestry.

In the city, the population was spread out, with 24.9% under the age of 18 and 75.1% over 18. Males accounted for 49% and females 51%.

Between 2009 and 2013, the median household income in Lynn was $44,849. The per capita income was $22,982. About 21.0% of the population was considered below the poverty line.

=== Asian population ===
In 1990 Lynn had 2,993 persons of Asian origin. In 2000 Lynn had 5,730 Asians, an increase of over 91%, making it one of ten Massachusetts cities with the largest Asian populations. In 2000 the city had 3,050 persons of Cambodian origin, making them the largest Asian subgroup in Lynn. That year the city had 1,112 persons of Vietnamese origin and 353 persons of Indian origin. From 1990 to 2000 the Vietnamese and Indian populations increased by 192% and 264%, respectively.

By 2004 the Cambodian community in Lynn was establishing the Khmer Association of the North Shore.

=== Income ===
Data is from the 2009–2013 American Community Survey 5-Year Estimates.

| Rank | ZIP Code (ZCTA) | Per capita income | Median household income | Median family income | Population | Number of households |
|---|---|---|---|---|---|---|
| | Massachusetts | $35,763 | $66,866 | $84,900 | 6,605,058 | 2,530,147 |
| | Essex County | $35,167 | $67,311 | $84,185 | 750,808 | 286,008 |
| 1 | 01904 | $33,409 | $80,903 | $91,409 | 18,803 | 6,833 |
| | United States | $28,155 | $53,046 | $64,719 | 311,536,594 | 115,610,216 |
| | Lynn | $22,982 | $44,849 | $53,557 | 90,788 | 33,122 |
| 2 | 01901 | $20,625 | $23,467 | $24,125 | 2,023 | 1,096 |
| 3 | 01902 | $20,391 | $37,275 | $45,276 | 44,827 | 16,528 |
| 4 | 01905 | $19,934 | $42,490 | $42,163 | 25,090 | 8,642 |

=== Safety ===
Lynn has long had a reputation for crime and vice, sometimes reflected in the “City of Sin” nickname and related rebranding discussions beginning in the early 1990s. However, more recent crime analyses based on FBI-reported data suggest that Lynn’s violent crime rate is broadly comparable to Boston’s and is near the national average. Residential neighborhoods across much of the city are generally safer than areas surrounding the downtown. NeighborhoodScout estimates the annual chance of being a victim of violent crime at approximately 1 in 175 in Lynn, compared with 1 in 161 in Boston. According to the same source, Lynn’s property-crime risk is lower than Boston’s, at about 1 in 86 in Lynn versus 1 in 47 in Boston.

Similarly, FBI Uniform Crime Reporting data for 2019 show that Boston’s violent crime rate (approximately 607 per 100,000 residents) was higher than Lynn’s (approximately 492 per 100,000 residents).

According to homicide rate statistics, Lynn’s murder rate of about 2.9 per 100,000 residents is around two-times lower than the national average of approximately 6.0 per 100,000. This suggests that a smaller proportion of violent incidents in Lynn are fatal compared with the national level.

More recent local statistics also indicate improvement. According to data released by the Lynn Police Department, total reported incidents declined by about 13% in 2024 compared with the previous year, while domestic incidents fell by roughly 12%. Homicides decreased from six in 2023 to two in 2024, reflecting a broader short-term decline in serious incidents.

== Government ==
Lynn is represented in the state legislature by officials elected from the following districts:

- Massachusetts Senate's 3rd Essex district
- Massachusetts House of Representatives' 8th Essex district
- Massachusetts House of Representatives' 9th Essex district
- Massachusetts House of Representatives' 10th Essex district
- Massachusetts House of Representatives' 11th Essex district

Lynn presidential election results
| Year | Democratic | Republican | Third parties | Total Votes | Margin |
|---|---|---|---|---|---|
| 2024 | 60.31% 18,982 | 37.70% 11,865 | 1.99% 625 | 31,472 | 22.51% |
| 2020 | 68.93% 24,662 | 29.14% 10,425 | 1.93% 690 | 35,777 | 39.79% |
| 2016 | 67.51% 22,164 | 28.36% 9,311 | 4.13% 1,355 | 32,830 | 39.15% |
| 2012 | 72.09% 23,124 | 26.54% 8,512 | 1.37% 440 | 32,076 | 45.55% |
| 2008 | 68.18% 20,276 | 29.32% 8,719 | 2.50% 744 | 29,739 | 38.86% |
| 2004 | 69.17% 19,372 | 29.90% 8,373 | 0.94% 262 | 28,007 | 39.27% |
| 2000 | 68.87% 18,836 | 24.78% 6,776 | 6.35% 1,738 | 27,350 | 44.10% |
| 1996 | 67.84% 18,370 | 20.81% 5,634 | 11.36% 3,075 | 27,079 | 47.03% |
| 1992 | 50.43% 15,275 | 24.27% 7,350 | 25.31% 7,665 | 30,290 | 25.12% |
| 1988 | 59.30% 18,540 | 38.96% 12,182 | 1.73% 542 | 31,264 | 20.34% |
| 1984 | 53.90% 17,103 | 45.52% 14,445 | 0.57% 182 | 31,730 | 8.38% |
| 1980 | 49.20% 15,777 | 37.32% 11,966 | 13.48% 4,323 | 32,066 | 11.88% |
| 1976 | 62.24% 21,430 | 33.63% 11,580 | 4.13% 1,422 | 34,432 | 28.61% |
| 1972 | 62.06% 24,124 | 37.28% 14,490 | 0.66% 255 | 38,869 | 24.79% |
| 1968 | 71.93% 28,740 | 23.77% 9,500 | 4.30% 1,718 | 39,958 | 48.15% |
| 1964 | 84.07% 36,671 | 15.54% 6,779 | 0.39% 169 | 43,619 | 68.53% |
| 1960 | 64.73% 31,001 | 34.96% 16,746 | 0.31% 149 | 47,896 | 29.76% |
| 1956 | 49.68% 24,191 | 50.05% 24,368 | 0.27% 131 | 48,690 | 0.36% |
| 1952 | 52.19% 27,460 | 47.24% 24,856 | 0.56% 297 | 52,613 | 4.95% |
| 1948 | 59.36% 27,954 | 37.70% 17,753 | 2.93% 1,382 | 47,089 | 21.66% |
| 1944 | 57.10% 26,578 | 42.60% 19,826 | 0.30% 140 | 46,544 | 14.51% |
| 1940 | 55.84% 26,509 | 43.43% 20,617 | 0.73% 346 | 47,472 | 12.41% |

Voter registration and party enrollment as of February 2, 2025 – Lynn
| Party | Number of voters | Percentage |
|---|---|---|
| Democratic | 20,037 | 31.90% |
| Republican | 3,529 | 5.62% |
| Unenrolled | 38,681 | 61.59% |
| Political Designations | 559 | 0.89% |
| Total | 62,806 | 100% |

== Arts and culture ==
=== Notable locations ===
- Lynn as of 2022 is home to the Massachusetts Monarchs a minor league basketball team competing in The Basketball League.
- Fraser Field, municipal baseball stadium constructed in the 1940s under the Works Progress Administration. It has housed many minor league baseball teams and a few major league exhibition games for the Boston Red Sox. Currently, it is the home of the North Shore Navigators of the Futures Collegiate Baseball League.
- Manning Field, the municipal football stadium. It is the former site of Manning Bowl (c. 1936 – August 2005).
- Lynn Memorial Auditorium
- Mary Baker Eddy House
- Lucian Newhall House
- Grand Army of the Republic Hall (Lynn, Massachusetts)
- Lynn Museum & Historical Society
- Lynn Community Television
- Capitol Diner
- Lynn Masonic Hall
- St. Stephen's Memorial Episcopal Church

== Parks and recreation ==
Lynn was among the first communities in America to set aside a significant portion of its total land areas for open space—initially to secure a common public wood source. In 1693, Lynn restricted use of areas today encompassed by the Lynn Woods Reservation, and imposed fines for removing young trees. Although this land area was subsequently divided, in 1706, rights of public access were maintained, and, during the 19th century, recreational use of the woods increased.

In 1850, the first hiking club in New England—the Lynn Exploring Circle—was established. In 1881, a group of Lynn residents organized the Trustees of the Free Public Forest to protect Lynn Woods by acquiring land and gifting it to the city. Frederick Law Olmsted was hired as a design consultant for Lynn Woods, in 1889, whereupon he recommended keeping the land wild, adding only limited public access improvements.

Lynn Woods was among the natural resources that inspired landscape architect Charles Eliot and others to create Boston's Metropolitan Park System. In 1893, Eliot noted that Lynn Woods "constitute the largest and most interesting, because the wildest, public domain in all New England."

Today, Lynn has 49 parks encompassing 1,540 aggregate acres, representing about 22% of the city's total 6,874-acre land area. Consequently, 96% of all Lynn residents live within a 10-minute walk of a park or open space. The city's parks and open spaces include:

- Lynn Shore Reservation
- Lynn Woods Reservation, the largest municipal park in New England, at 2,200 acres (8.9 km^{2}). The bulk of the Reservation's land area is situated in the City of Lynn, but portions fall within the boundaries of adjoining municipalities. Several historical sites such as Stone Tower, Steel Tower, the Wolf Pits, and Dungeon Rock, believed to be the site of still-unrecovered pirate treasure, are located here. Many schools have cross-country track meets in Lynn Woods.
- Lynn Commons, an area between North and South Common Streets.
- Lynn Heritage State Park
- High Rock Tower, a stone observation tower with a view of Nahant, Boston, Downtown Lynn, Egg Rock, and the ocean. The top of the structure houses a telescope, which is open for the public to use.
- Pine Grove Cemetery, an intact rural cemetery, and one of the largest cemeteries in the country. Ripley's Believe It or Not once claimed the fieldstone wall around the cemetery was the "second longest contiguous stone wall in the world", after the Great Wall of China.
- Spring Pond, historic retreat of wild woodlands.
- Goldfish Pond/Lafayette Park
- Northern Strand Community Trail connects Lynn with Revere, Saugus, Malden, and Everett, Massachusetts.

== Education ==
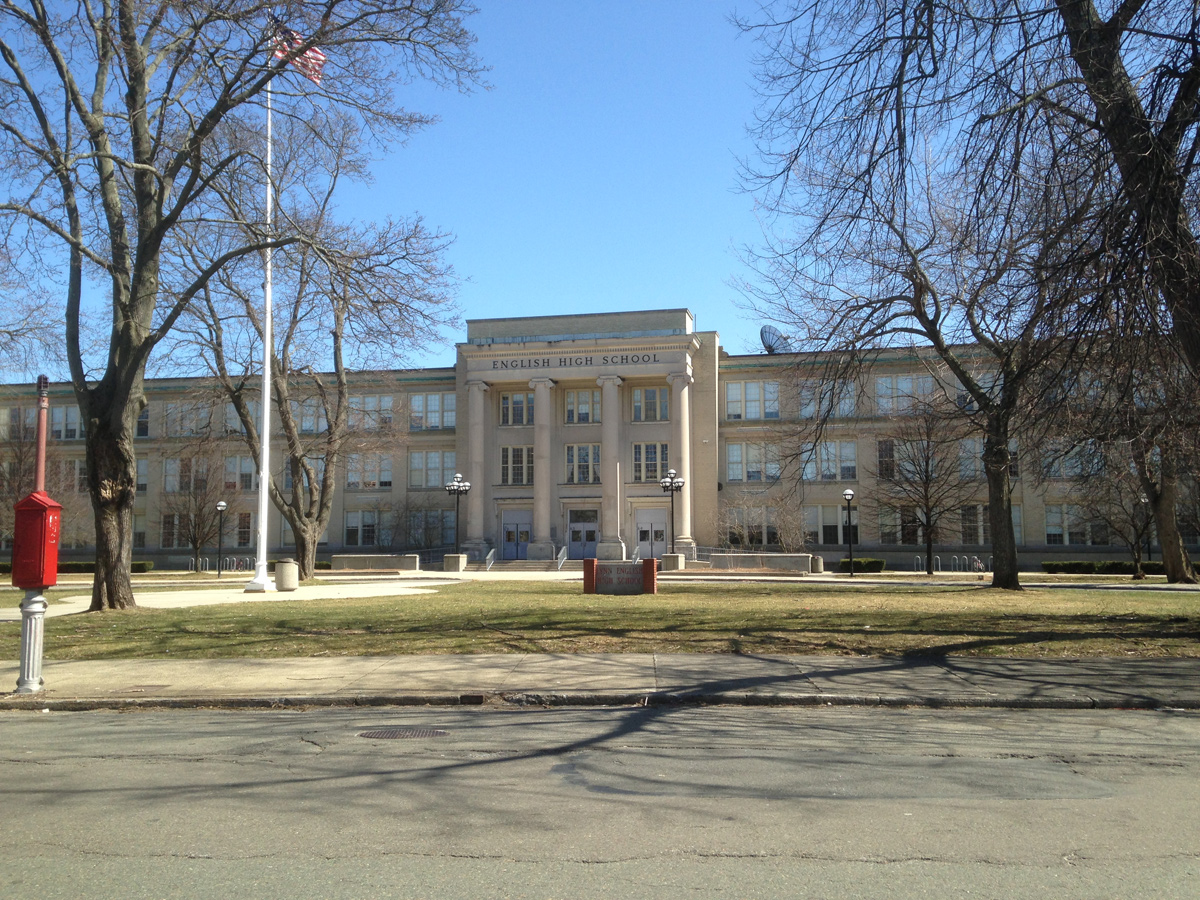
Lynn English High School

Lynn has three public high schools (Lynn English, Lynn Classical, and Lynn Vocational Technical High School), four middle/junior high schools, two alternative schools, and, as of Autumn 2015, 18 elementary schools. They are served by the Lynn Public Schools district.

KIPP: the Knowledge Is Power Program operates the KIPP Academy Lynn, a 5–8 charter middle school, and a charter high school called KIPP Academy Lynn Collegiate.

There is also an independent Catholic high school located in the city, St. Mary's High School. There are two Catholic primary schools, St. Pius V School and the now defunct Sacred Heart School. There is also one interdenominational Christian school, North Shore Christian School.

North Shore Community College has a campus in downtown Lynn (with its other campuses located in Danvers and Beverly).

== Infrastructure ==
=== Transportation ===
Lynn has no Interstate or controlled-access highways, the nearest being U.S. Route 1 in Saugus and Lynnfield, and the combined Interstate 95 and Route 128 in Lynnfield. (The original design of Interstate 95 called for a route that would have paralleled Route 107 and crossed Lynn—including Lynn Woods—but the project was cancelled in 1972.) However, Massachusetts State Route 1A, Route 107, Route 129 and Route 129A all pass through Lynn. Route 107 passes from southwest to northeast along a relatively straight right-of-way through the city. It shares a 0.5 miles (0.80 km) concurrency with Route 129A, which follows Route 129's old route through the city between its parent route and Route 1A. Route 129 passes from the north of the city before turning south and passing through the downtown area and becoming concurrent with Route 1A for 1 mile (1.6 km). Route 1A passes from Revere along the western portion of the Lynnway, a divided highway within the city, before passing further inland into Swampscott. The Lynnway itself runs along the coastline, leading to a rotary, which links the road to Nahant Road and Lynn Shore Drive, which follows the coast into Swampscott.

Lynn is served by Lynn station on the Newburyport/Rockport Line of the MBTA Commuter Rail system, as well as River Works station (which is for GE Aviation employees only). A number of other stations were open until the mid 20th century. Numerous MBTA bus routes also connect Lynn with Boston and the neighboring communities. An extension of the Blue Line to downtown Lynn has been proposed, but not funded. MBTA ferry route F5 service operates between Blossom Street Pier and downtown Boston. The nearest airport is Boston's Logan International Airport, about 5 miles (8.0 km) south.

== Notable people ==
- Harry Agganis, All-American quarterback at Boston University and Boston Red Sox player
- Corinne Alphen, model and actress
- Stan Andrews, major league baseball player
- Julie Archoska, football player
- Paul Barresi, pornographic actor
- Louis P. Bénézet, educator and writer
- Alice Frances Blood, chemist, home economics professor
- Verna Bloom, American actress (Animal House, High Plains Drifter, The Last Temptation of Christ)
- Ben Bowden, pitcher on 2014 Vanderbilt Commodores baseball team; currently pitches for the Atlanta Braves and has pitched for the Colorado Rockies
- Estelle Parsons, actress, singer and stage director, Best Supporting Actress 1967 Academy Awards, was born at Lynn in 1927.
- Walter Brennan, actor, winner of three Academy Awards, was born in Lynn
- Les Burke, major league baseball player
- Marion Cowan Burrows, physician and pharmacist, state legislator (1928–1932) representing Lynn
- John Deering, major league baseball player
- Joe Dixon, jazz clarinet player
- Frederick Douglass, abolitionist
- Charles Remond Douglass, soldier
- Mary Baker Eddy, founder of Christian Science
- Rashidi Ellis, professional boxer
- Zari Elmassian, singer, born in Lynn
- Olger Escobar, Major League Soccer player for CF Montréal
- Derek Falvey, Major League Baseball executive, was raised in Lynn
- Josh Fogg, major league baseball player
- James Durrell Greene, famous inventor and US Civil War Brevet Brigadier General, was born in Lynn
- Bump Hadley, major league baseball player
- Neil Hamilton, actor, played "Commissioner Gordon" on TV's Batman
- Hutchinson Family Singers, 19th-century singing group
- George E. Harney, architect
- Jim Hegan, major league baseball player
- Frederick Herzberg, psychologist, most famous for introducing job enrichment and the Motivator-Hygiene theory, was born in Lynn
- Ken Hill, professional baseball player
- Mary Sargent Hopkins, women's health advocate and bicycle enthusiast
- Chris Howard, professional baseball pitcher
- Christopher Hussey, sea captain, proprietor of Nantucket, and councilor of New Hampshire; settler in 1632
- Louise Kirtland, actress
- Ruth Bancroft Law, aviator, was born in Lynn
- Alexander E. Little, founder of A.E. Little & Co, maker of Sorosis shoes
- Jerry Maren, longtime character actor who played the middle "Lollipop Guild" member in 1939's "The Wizard Of Oz" film
- Jan Ernst Matzeliger, Surinamese inventor of shoe-manufacturing equipment, lived in Lynn
- Linda McCarriston, poet, was born and raised in Lynn
- Thomas M. McGee, attorney, State Representative, State Senator, Mayor of Lynn
- Thomas W. McGee, City Councillor, State Representative, Speaker of the Massachusetts House of Representatives
- Ralph McLane, clarinetist
- Walter Mears, journalist
- Ralph Merry, founder of Magog, Quebec, was born in Lynn in 1753.
- Mike Ness, musician, founder of the rock band, Social Distortion. Born in Lynn
- Alex Newell, actor and singer, notably from the hit TV series Glee
- Jack Noseworthy, actor
- Mike Pazik, major league baseball player
- William Dudley Pelley, founder of the Silver Legion of America
- Lydia Pinkham, American inventor and marketer of a herbal-alcoholic "women's tonic"
- Lotta S. Rand, social worker, Red Cross worker in WWI France
- Chandler Robbins, pastor, Second Church, Boston; born in Lynn
- Ruth Roman, actress, notably from Strangers on a Train, was born in Lynn
- Tom Rowe, professional hockey player
- Blondy Ryan, major league baseball player
- Harold Shapero, Composer and educator, was born in Lynn
- Todd Smith, pro wrestler
- Louise Spizizen, composer, musician, and author
- Susan Stafford, original hostess of Wheel of Fortune
- Lesley Stahl, television journalist, 60 Minutes, was born in Lynn
- Gasper Urban, football player
- Holman K. Wheeler, architect of more than 400 structures in Lynn
- Frances Hodges White, children's author
- Tom Whelan, major league baseball player
- Charles Herbert Woodbury, artist and teacher
- John Yau, poet and art critic

== In literature and the arts ==
- Many versions of the Mother Goose nursery rhyme "Trot, trot to Boston" include Lynn as the second destination.
- Scenes from the movie Surrogates (2009), especially the chase scene, were filmed in downtown Lynn. Lynn native Jack Noseworthy starred in the film, and has said he pushes Lynn as a location whenever involved in a project.
- The character of Freddie Quell in The Master (2012) is from Lynn and returns there for a scene, though it was filmed in California.
- The movie Black Mass (2015) starring Johnny Depp feature several scenes shot in Lynn.
- The high school scene in Central Intelligence (2016) was filmed at Lynn Classical and Lynn English high schools.
- Several scenes in Sound of Metal (2019) were filmed in Lynn.

== See also ==
- List of mill towns in Massachusetts
- Timeline of Lynn, Massachusetts
- National Register of Historic Places listings in Lynn, Massachusetts
- National Register of Historic Places listings in Essex County, Massachusetts
- List of museums in Massachusetts
- Lynn and Boston Railroad
- Lynn Belt Line Street Railway
- Boston, Revere Beach and Lynn Railroad
- Belden Bly Bridge

== Bibliography ==
- Lewis, Alonzo and James Robinson Newhall. History of Lynn, Essex County, Massachusetts: Including Lynnfield, Saugus, Swampscott and Nahant. Published 1865 by John L. Shorey 13 Washington St. Lynn.
- Panoramic View of the Hutchinson Family Home on High Rock including all of Lynn, Massachusetts published 1881 by Armstrong and Co, at the LOC website.
- D'Entremont, Jeremy. Egg Rock Lighthouse History. Website.
- Carlson, W. Bernard. Innovation as a Social Process: Elihu Thomson and the Rise of General Electric, 1870–1900 (Cambridge: Cambridge University Press, 1991).
- Woodbury, David O. Elihu Thomson, Beloved Scientist (Boston: Museum of Science, 1944)
- Haney, John L. The Elihu Thomson Collection, American Philosophical Society Yearbook 1944.
- United Press International. "Blaze destroys urban complex in Lynn, Mass." The New York Times, November 29, 1981. Page 28.
