= Lynn Heritage State Park =

Massachusetts state park

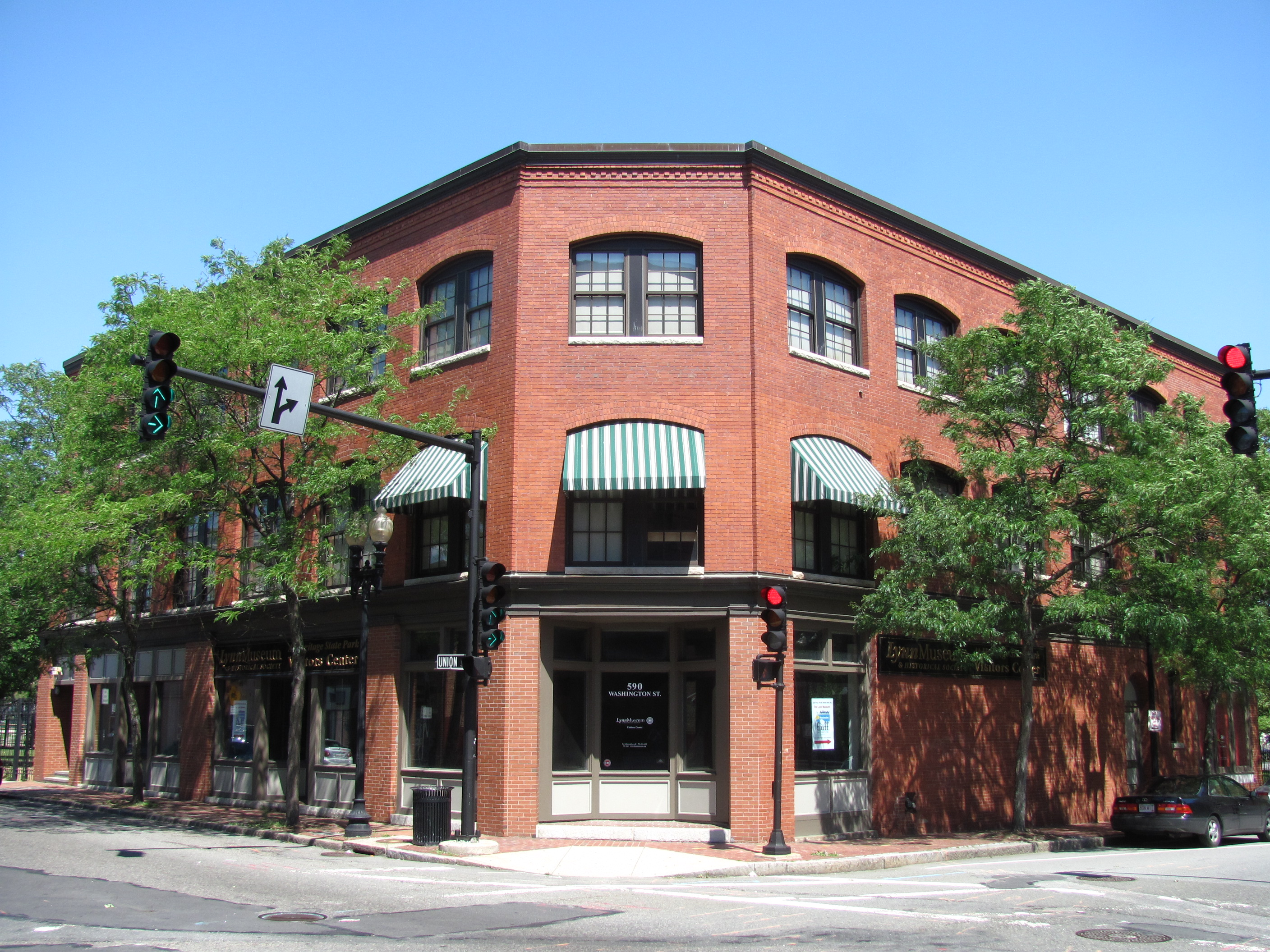
- Lynn Museum (formerly the Park Visitors Center)

- Location within Massachusetts Location within the United States
- Location: Lynn, Essex, Massachusetts, United States
- Coordinates: 42°27′47″N 70°56′39″W
- Area: 4.5 acres (1.8 ha)
- Established: 1986
- Operator: Lynn Museum and Historical Society
- Owner: Massachusetts Department of Conservation and Recreation
- Website: https://lynnmuseum.org/

Lynn Heritage State Park is a history-themed state park in downtown Lynn, Massachusetts, and is part of the Metropolitan Park System of Greater Boston. It opened in 1986. The Lynn Museum and Historical Society (the tenant of the former Park Visitor Center building) now displays exhibits which highlight the city's industrial past, the tradition of shoemaking and its transition from a handicraft to mechanization, and the story of Elihu Thomson, an engineer and inventor instrumental in the founding of General Electric. The park offers guided tours and a self-guided walking tour and includes the nearby 4.5-acre (1.8 ha) Waterfront Park, located at Lynn Harbor.
