= Lynn Woods Reservation =

- Lynn Woods Historic District
- U.S. National Register of Historic Places
- U.S. Historic district
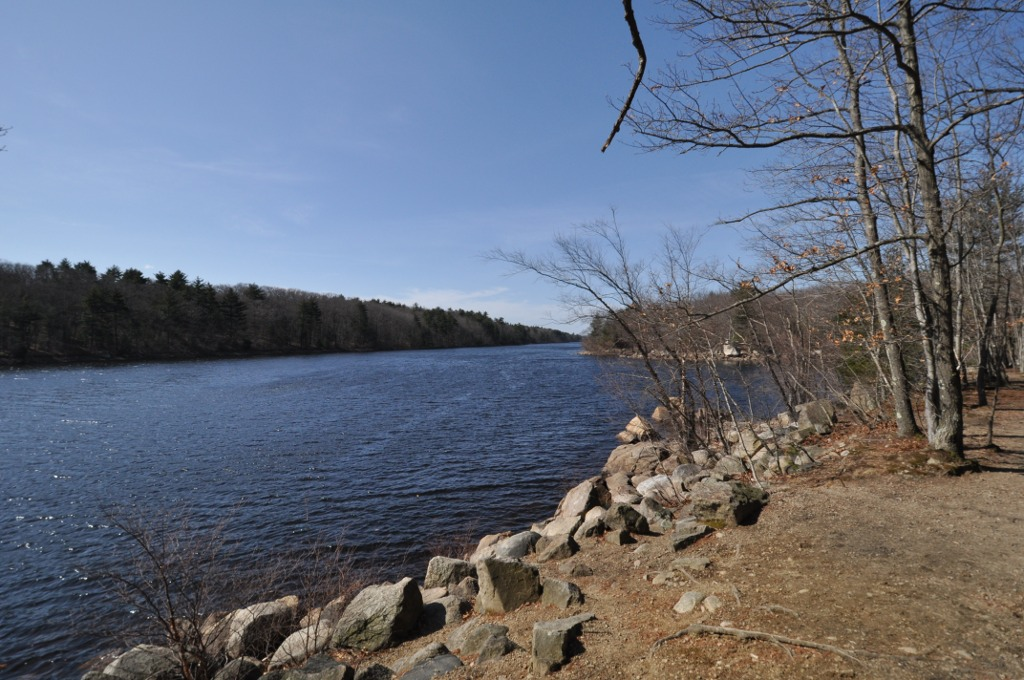
- Walden Pond, the reservation's largest body of water

- Location within Massachusetts Location within the United States
- Location: Lynn, Massachusetts
- Coordinates: 42°29′21″N 70°59′13″W
- Built: 1889; 137 years ago
- Architect: Frederick Law Olmsted
- NRHP reference No.: 96000951
- Added to NRHP: September 6, 1996

Lynn Woods Reservation is a 2,200-acre (8.9 km^{2}) municipal forest park founded in 1881 and located in Lynn, Essex County, Massachusetts. The City of Lynn's Department of Public Works, Park Commission and Lynn Water & Sewer Commission share jurisdiction and management of Lynn Woods Reservation. The park encompasses nearly one-fifth of the entire land area of the city and represents a significant natural, watershed and public recreational resource in eastern Massachusetts.

The entire portion of the reservation within Lynn city bounds was added to the National Register of Historic Places in 1996 as a historic district. A small portion of the park is actually in Saugus, a neighboring town to Lynn.

== History ==
The northwestern part of Lynn has long been public land, its southern sections used as pasture land as early as the 18th century. Breed's Pond, at the southern end of the reservation, was dammed for industrial use in the 1840s, and Dungeon Rock became a tourist attraction in the 1850s. Demands for improved water supply (for both consumption and fire suppression) in the 1860s led to organized activities to conserve the woodlands surround Breed's and Walden Ponds. In 1881 the Trustees for the Free Public Forest were established to oversee the area. They were folded into a newly organized Lynn Parks Department in 1889 to manage 1,600 acres (650 ha) of water supply and park land in the reservation; this grew to the current 2,200 acres (890 ha) in 1892. The Gannon Municipal Golf Course was developed in the 1930s (as the Happy Valley Golf Course), as was the road and trail network that covers the park.

== See also ==
- National Register of Historic Places listings in Lynn, Massachusetts
- National Register of Historic Places listings in Essex County, Massachusetts
