= Mowers' Block =

- U.S. National Register of Historic Places
- U.S. Historic district – Contributing property
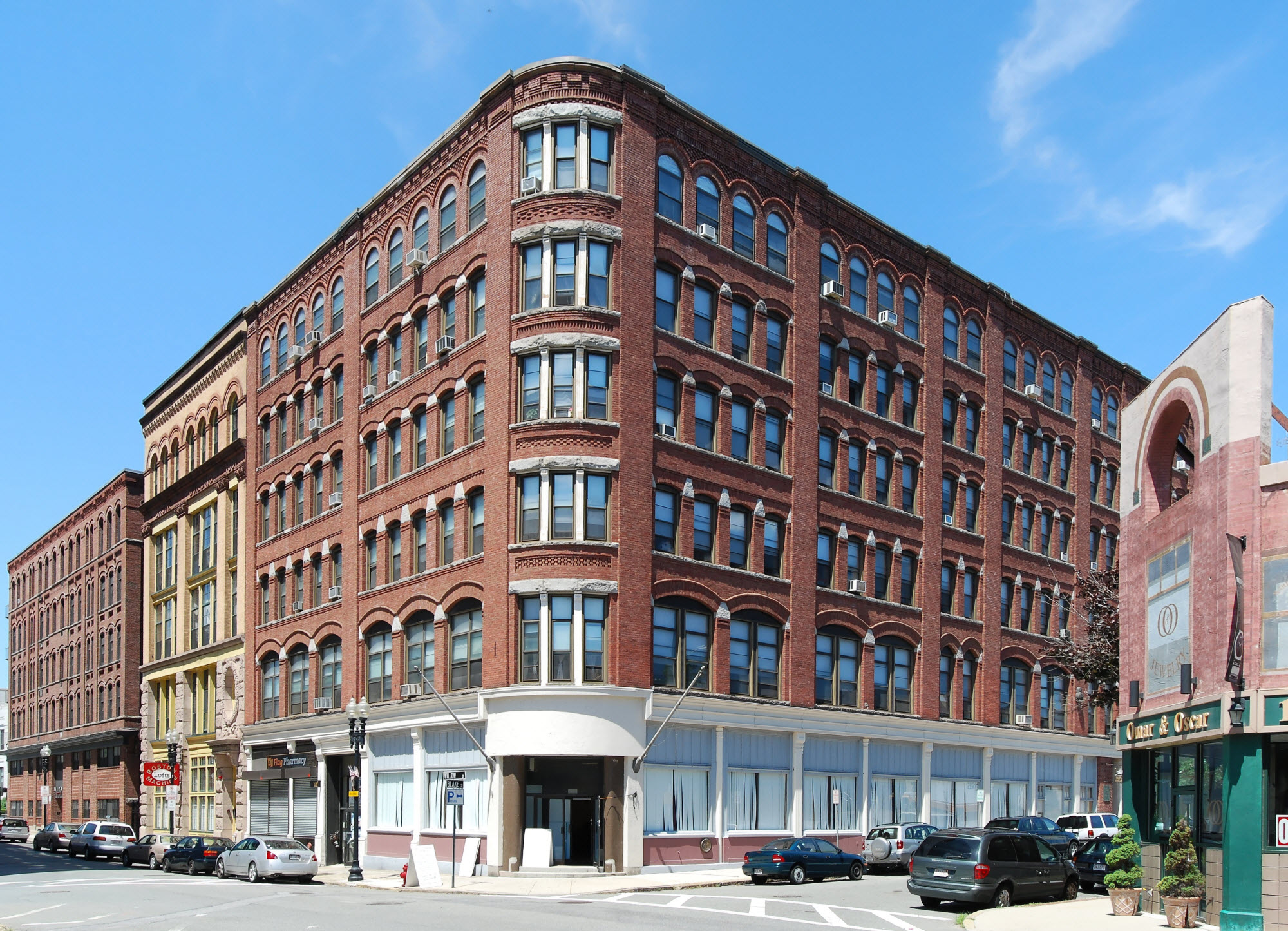

- Location within Massachusetts Location within the United States
- Location: Lynn, Massachusetts
- Coordinates: 42°27′51″N 70°56′44″W
- Built: 1891
- Architect: Earp, Edwin
- Architectural style: Gothic
- Part of: Central Square Historic District (ID85003335)
- NRHP reference No.: 82001991

Significant dates
- Added to NRHP: February 25, 1982
- Designated CP: December 10, 1985

The Mowers' Block is a historic commercial block at Seven Willow St. and 67-83 Blake Street in downtown Lynn, Massachusetts. It was built in 1891 for the Mower & Brother shoemaking firm. The brick and granite building was built on the site of the Mower's old factory, in which the Great Lynn Fire of 1889 started, destroying not just their factory but a large swath of downtown Lynn as well. When completed, it was the largest building in the burned area.

It was added to the National Register of Historic Places in 1982, and was included in the Central Square Historic District in 1985.

== See also ==
- National Register of Historic Places listings in Lynn, Massachusetts
- National Register of Historic Places listings in Essex County, Massachusetts
