= Mary Sargent Hopkins =

American cycling activist

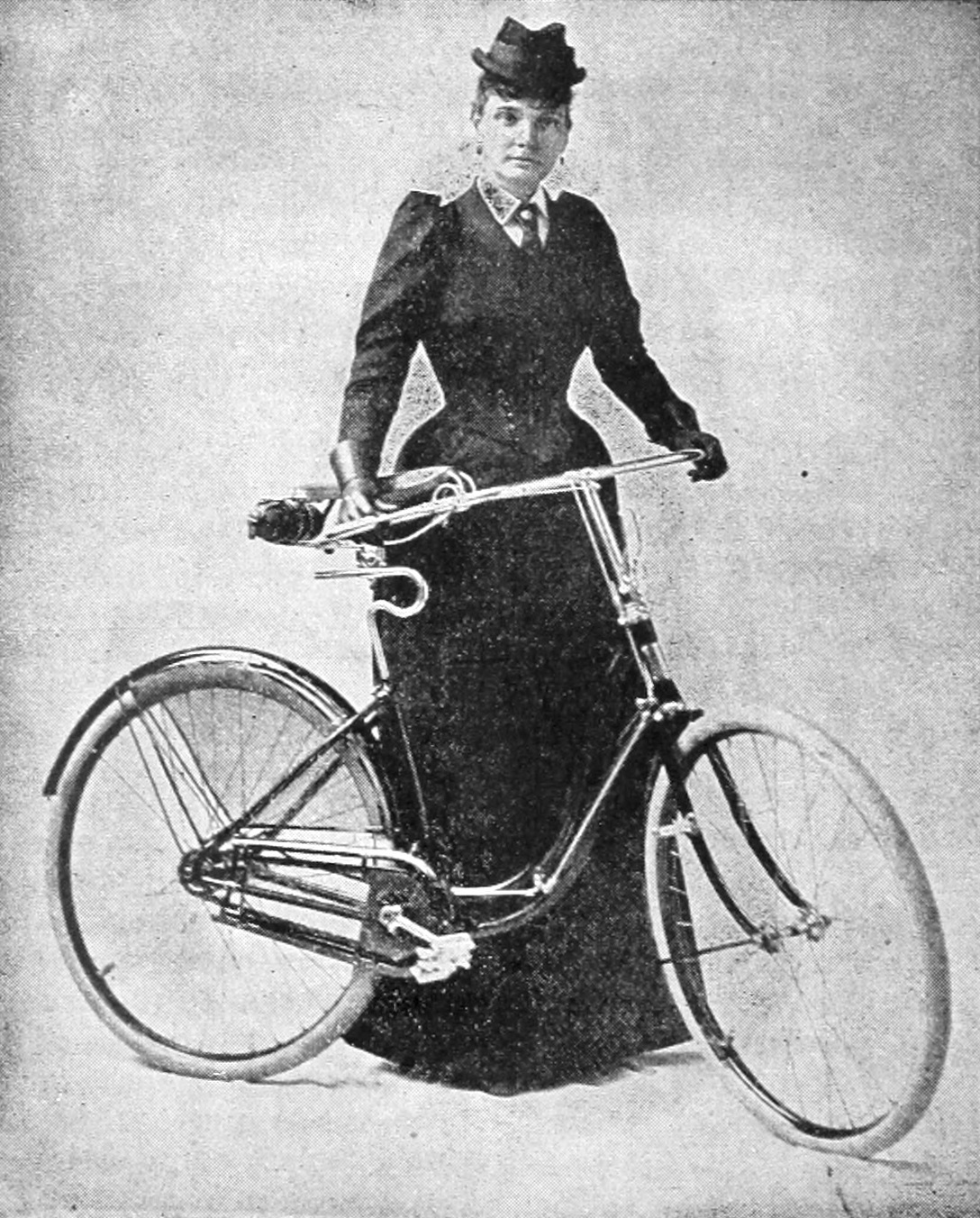
Mary Sargent Hopkins, an American columnist, lecturer and women's cycling activist. Photo published in 1893.

Mary Sargent Hopkins, also known as Miss "Merrie Wheeler" and The "Outdoor Woman", was an American women's health advocate and bicycle enthusiast, that used her work to promote the domestic role of a woman. In addition to this, Hopkins was a journalist, publishing many articles regarding women's health and bicycling for women. She was the founder of the women's cycling magazine "The Wheelwoman", and through this magazine promoted her beliefs on womanhood and health to her readers. Hopkins believed that women riding bicycles and being outdoors more would better their mental and physical health, and she thought that the stigma around women not being able to ride bikes should change. Although a women's advocate in the cycling and health sphere, Hopkins did not believe in the progression of women's rights in all other aspects, and she connected the work that she did back to the necessity of the domestic role of a woman.

== Life ==
Born in 1847, in Lynn, Massachusetts, to the Neal family, Hopkins grew up not well off in society. Hopkins' father, Walter Neal, was a shoemaker in Lynn, Massachusetts, where he and his wife, Lydia Blabon, moved to after living in rural New England. Later, the couple moved their family to Nyack, New York so Neal could enlist himself in the Union Army. After moving to Nyack, NY, Hopkins married John B. Reynolds, a writer and photographer. They soon after divorced, leading Hopkins to move to Brooklyn, New York where she married her second husband, Charles Hopkins. Charles Hopkins' father owned a furniture and bedding store in Boston, Massachusetts, leading the couple to move to the Boston area soon after their marriage, due to his father's death in around 1885. The couple initially lived in Boston, then moved to Medford, and moved again to Melrose. They had a son named Ernest and a granddaughter named Constance. Charles Hopkins died sometime between 1906 and 1910, which led to Mary Sargent Hopkins moving back to Manhattan Hopkins lived there until sometime in the 1920s, before her death in 1924, and passed at a friend's home in Pembroke, Massachusetts at the age of 77.

During her marriage to Charles Hopkins, Hopkins had become a politically engaged middle-class woman. As part of the mid-1890s great cycling boom, Hopkins conducted her own cycling magazine called "The Wheelwoman" and published many articles regarding this topic. Scholars have not found specifically what prompted Hopkins to begin her literary work regarding bicycles, but they have found that she began her work due to her belief that bicycles are emancipators for women, and because she thought it would help them mentally and physically. Hopkins was also an avid cycler herself, partaking in all tricycling tours between 1885 and 1888, and some scholars believe her participation and involvement with bicycles led her to writing "The Wheelwoman" and conducting the work that she did. One scholar also believes that Hopkins may have been influenced be her aunt whom Hopkins was named after, Mary Sargent Neal, as she too was a well known writer and lecturer during the 1840s and 1850s. In addition to this, Hopkins' father, Walter Neal, abandoned their family during the time he served in the military and had a gambling addiction. Some believe that this too may be a reason for Hopkins beliefs on drinking, temperance, and male morality, and why she thought cycling could counterbalance things such as these.

== Work ==
The work of Hopkins had a target audience of women, specifically in New York, Chicago, and Boston, who were considered to have been affluent and progressive, but also respectable in society's terms. Before the establishment of her own cycling magazine, Hopkins published individual articles, in Bicycling World and L.A.W. Bulletin, New England Kitchen Magazine and Good Housekeeping, The New York Times, Haper's Bazaar, and Frank Leslie's Popular Monthly Hopkins was also the founder and editor of the magazine The Wheelwoman, describing herself as a conductor of the magazine, which was a popular periodical for women's cyclist The Wheelwoman was published monthly out of Hopkins' office in Boston and was in print from February 1895 to December 1897, and possibly longer. Hopkins utilized The Wheelwoman as a way to showcase cycling to women as something that is part of social reform and physical well-being.

Scholars have suggested that Hopkins' had a three step strategy to get herself and her work to be well known. Hopkins started off by first arguing that the acceptance of women' sport is due to "the pioneer women" and not medical professionals who authorized such activities. Hopkins stated that it is purely the will and desire of a woman that evokes her to go outdoors; not medical, or any other kind advice. And that if a woman does not go outdoors, it is also due to her own choice. According to scholar Sarah Hallenbeck, Hopkins' contestation of medicalization in her writing is a perspective that worked well in popular periodicals due to its celebration of innovation and disdain for tradition. Individuals enjoyed reading periodicals such as these as it highlighted the world as a rapidly changing place with new possibilities, which helped female authors such as Hopkins to effectively contest medical commonplaces.

Hopkins utilized this women-centered narrative she created to position herself as the current expert on women's exercise due to her own experiences. Hopkins uses this established ethos as an expert on women's sport to conduct journalistic pieces that promoted her specific views on the modern active women. Through this, Hopkins generated a conservative ideal that she called "the renewed women". Hopkins encouraged her readers to identify with and model themselves as "renewed women", and she disagreed with the concept of cyclist women being "new women". The main difference between the "new" and "renewed" women was that the renewed women still embodied and held the ideals of Victorian femininity. The "new women" was an ideal that supported women's empowerment and equality in the late nineteenth century. If viewed positively, a "new woman" was considered to be one that was educated, employed, financially independent, healthy, empowered, and politically active in the public sphere. Hopkins believed that the "new woman" led women to behaving mannishly and masculine, which she also openly disagreed with, considering "new women" to be "ungentle." Hopkins believed that any women who thought of herself as a "new woman" was "not the real woman" at all as she would be embodying traits and portraying herself in a manner only deemed fit for a man. According to Hopkins, the "renewed woman" encouraged women to have empowered notions of themselves without having traits that society deemed to have been masculine. Hopkins focused her work on critiquing the social norms that kept women indoors and away from the benefits of nature. Hopkins called women who partook in outdoor activities "outdoor woman" and used this term, along with "outdoor womanhood", interchangeably with "renewed woman". Hopkins believed that both men and women had their place in society, and that their societal roles should not change, which she highlights in an article she published in Frank Leslie's Popular Monthly titled "The Outdoor Woman". She considered women's homes to be "indoor shrines" and that the "condition of servitude" it created led to poor health, self-esteem, and quality of life, which Hopkins thought could be fixed through outdoor activities. But, she also thought that women partaking in outdoor activities should be the only societal change, and that all other standards for woman should be upheld.

The period in which Hopkins wrote and published her work was one where women were not considered to be experts in journalism or medicine. Hopkins never had any sort of medical or formal training, and admits in her paper "The Horseless Carriage" that what she wrote about was not a scientific point of view, but a popular one. Hopkins utilizing a popular point of view instead of a scientific one is significant from a feminist standpoint as it embodies feminist theory. Feminist theory helps to address unequal and oppressive gender relations, which Hopkins does in her advocacy work regarding women being outdoors. Using a popular and opinionated point of view puts things into the perspective of a feminist lens, which enables a change and offers solutions by looking at the debated topic through lived experiences. Putting things into the perspective of a feminist lens may have been hard to do if Hopkins was explaining things from a scientific point of view as there was not much research on women's bodies during this era. In addition to this, scholars have found that when discussing gender and gender oppression, it is most effective to utilize this feminist lens and feminist literary criticism, highlighting the feminist significance of Hopkins' work and why her work may have been effective.

Besides Hopkins, there were other individuals during this era that were also bicycle enthusiasts, most notably Abbot Bassett and Kitte Knox. It is unclear whether or not Hopkins worked with Bassett or Knox, or other individuals in general, but it has been noted by scholars that she partook in the Ladies' North Shore Tricycle Tour, which Bassett also participated in. Hopkins also knew the famous abolitionist "Hutchinson Family Singers" well since she was a child, and John Hutchinson, a member of this family, became an avid supporter of women's cycling.

== Published works ==
- Easter Morn, poetry, 1882
- Sketches and reminiscences of the Radical Club of Chestnut Street, Boston, book, 1880
- THE TRIALS OF MRS. JULIA O'GRADY.: (As Related by Herself.) II.--MARY ELLEN BECOMES A "READER., magazine article, 1900
- Sargent Hopkins, Mary (14 March 1896). "Article". Harper's Bazaar. Vol. 29, no. 11. p. 245. ProQuest 1860663525.
- Sargent Hopkins, Mary (14 March 1896). "How the Bicycle Won Its Way Among Women". Harper's Bazaar. Vol. 29, no. 11. p. 244. ProQuest 125593550.
- The Bicycle For Women, magazine article, 1893
- The Horseless Carriage, magazine article, 1899
- The Outdoor Woman: The American Woman In Action, magazine article, 1899
- The Web of Life, magazine article, 1895

== Scholarship on Hopkins ==
Scholars have stated that Hopkins' intentions with her work and "The Wheelwoman" was to be dedicated to those women who were interested in riding bicycles and to make those who did not to start enjoying them. Hopkins had marketed the magazine as the bicycling authority for middle-class women and wanted to shape their views on health and womanhood. Scholars believe that Hopkins' goal was to encourage more women to utilize bicycles to give them a sense of peace in their lives away from their household responsibilities. Scholars also found that Hopkins had the goal to push women to aim to achieve physical perfection through biking and being active outdoors.

Many scholars believe that Hopkins was known for her role in the women's rights, temperance, and abolition movements in the late 1800s. But, many also believe the majority of her work does not directly address these issues. One theory that some scholars have is that Hopkins, whose audience was middle-class women, wanted to evoke change in a gradual way to comfort her audience, explaining why she pushed for the domesticity and femininity of women. Hopkins did not want to push too much change and scare off her target audience; if she had done so, many women may have become in opposition to Hopkins' work. Others believe Hopkins was reacting in opposition to influences in her life to defend the status quo.

In addition to this, some disagree with Hopkins' message that women should ride bicycles to better their life in the home. Believing that her work is contradictory in nature, some scholars believe her message to not align with what she was fighting for. Hopkins believed that women cycling would fix issues within their home life, make the women more attractive physically, and help them perform their domestic duties better, which some may argue go against the values being fought for in the women's rights movement. Although this is true, scholars do acknowledge that she was still influential in evoking change and movement for women's rights. For example, Susan B. Anthony's famous quote, "Bicycling has done more to emancipate women than perhaps anything else in the world”, has been tied back to Hopkins. While some argue that even though the work of Hopkins ended up helping the women's rights movement, it was not Hopkins' intention for her work to end up in this direction as she did not share the beliefs with women's rights activists.

== Legacy ==
Hopkins helped women to start utilizing bicycles in a time where bicycling was abnormal for a woman. In fact, Hopkins herself believed that it was her work and the "pioneer women" alone, not physicians, that led to women partaking in outdoor activities. Hopkins became the face of women on bicycles, and is said to be a champion of women's health. No scholar has been found to refer to Hopkins as a feminist, but she is considered to have been an individual who was politically engaged, an avid cyclist, and a leading advocate for women's cycling and outdoor activities.

Although a women's activist, Hopkins did not have the typical beliefs that many other feminists during this time had. Hopkins believed that while a woman should partake in outdoor activities, she must still appear to be feminine. Hopkins in a New York Times article, titled "Women's Wheeling Dress", explained how Hopkins disliked it when women portrayed themselves in a manner that men typically would have during this era, calling these women "creatures" and "a disgrace", and believing them to have been "obnoxious". Hopkins disagreed with the idea that women using bicycles were bending gender norms and were "new women", rather they were utilizing bikes to enhance women's lives within gender constructs.

Although not her intention, the work of Hopkins helped pave the way for women everywhere to use bicycles, and even though her target audience was not all women, women everywhere used the implications of her work to make a change. In the nineteenth century, women of all races, class, ethnicities, and religions started to utilize bicycles, which was previously limited to a specific demographic of white and middle to upper-class women. Minority women had to fight for their social space, and decided to take on bicycling as a way to do this. In addition to this, minority and immigrant women worked to get rid of the long-skirted Victorian dress code, some women entered the skilled occupation of bicycle repair, and others partook in bicycle racing.

Although controversial to some due to her views, Hopkins was able to successfully help pave the way for women partaking in outdoor activities to be a norm. Some scholars claim that some women during this era would have agreed that the bicycle had a revolutionary impact on women. But, scholars also argue that naturalizing the impact the bicycle had on women is problematic as it was not naturally revolutionary, but the bike was used as a medium by cyclists without a formal education, like Hopkins, to create an argument for their own beliefs and goals. So, although Hopkins was an avid cyclist, many believe that she only advocated the usage of bikes for the popularity of her own beliefs; that women should be outside more to better their performance in the home. Scholars believe that Hopkins thought of the bicycle as the best method to expand women's opportunities in self-improvement, not to make a revolutionary political change. Hopkins utilized the bicycle, which she refers to as her "faithful ally", to reinforce dominant ideology regarding societal gender norms by arguing that the bicycle would better women's lives if they stay within social constructs. Hopkins never agreed with women going against gender norms and only referred to the bicycle as something that was beneficial to those women who believed in female domestic roles. It is still a question of whether or not Hopkins would have been considered a feminist as it is difficult to distinguish her stance due to her beliefs on the expansion for women's roles and her confirmed thoughts on traditional gender roles. What is clear though is that she believed that it is beneficial for women to be outdoors and that women should still conform to traditional social norms, with women partaking in outdoor activities being the only thing that should change.

== See also ==
- Kittie Knox
