= Central Square Historic District (Lynn, Massachusetts) =

Historic district in Massachusetts, United States

- U.S. National Register of Historic Places
- U.S. Historic district
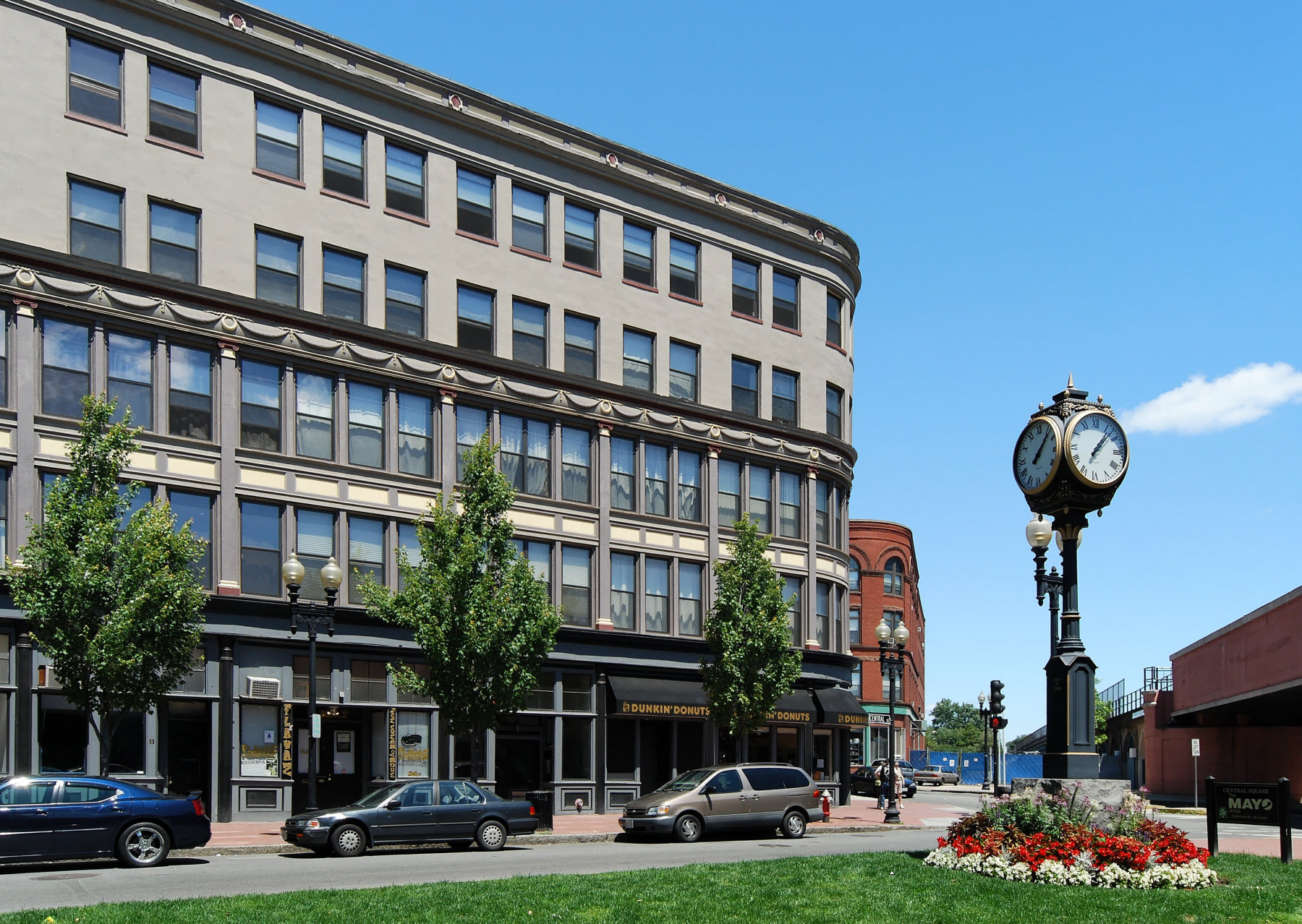

- Location within Massachusetts Location within the United States
- Location: Lynn, Massachusetts
- Coordinates: 42°27′50″N 70°56′44″W
- Architect: Multiple
- Architectural style: Classical Revival, Beaux Arts, Romanesque
- NRHP reference No.: 85003335
- Added to NRHP: December 10, 1985

The Central Square Historic District is a historic district encompassing the Central Square area of downtown Lynn, Massachusetts. The area is at the confluence of a number of city streets, and includes buildings that border on Central Avenue, Willow Street, Munroe Street, Lake Street, Almont Street. It is a small part of Lynn's "Burned District", a large area of the downtown that was destroyed by fire in 1889. One of the first buildings built after the fire, the Bergengren Block, stands at the corner of Union Street and Central Square. It also includes the Mowers' Block, listed on the National Register in 1982.

The district was added to the National Register of Historic Places in 1985.

== See also ==
- National Register of Historic Places listings in Lynn, Massachusetts
- National Register of Historic Places listings in Essex County, Massachusetts
