= Capitol Diner =

- U.S. National Register of Historic Places
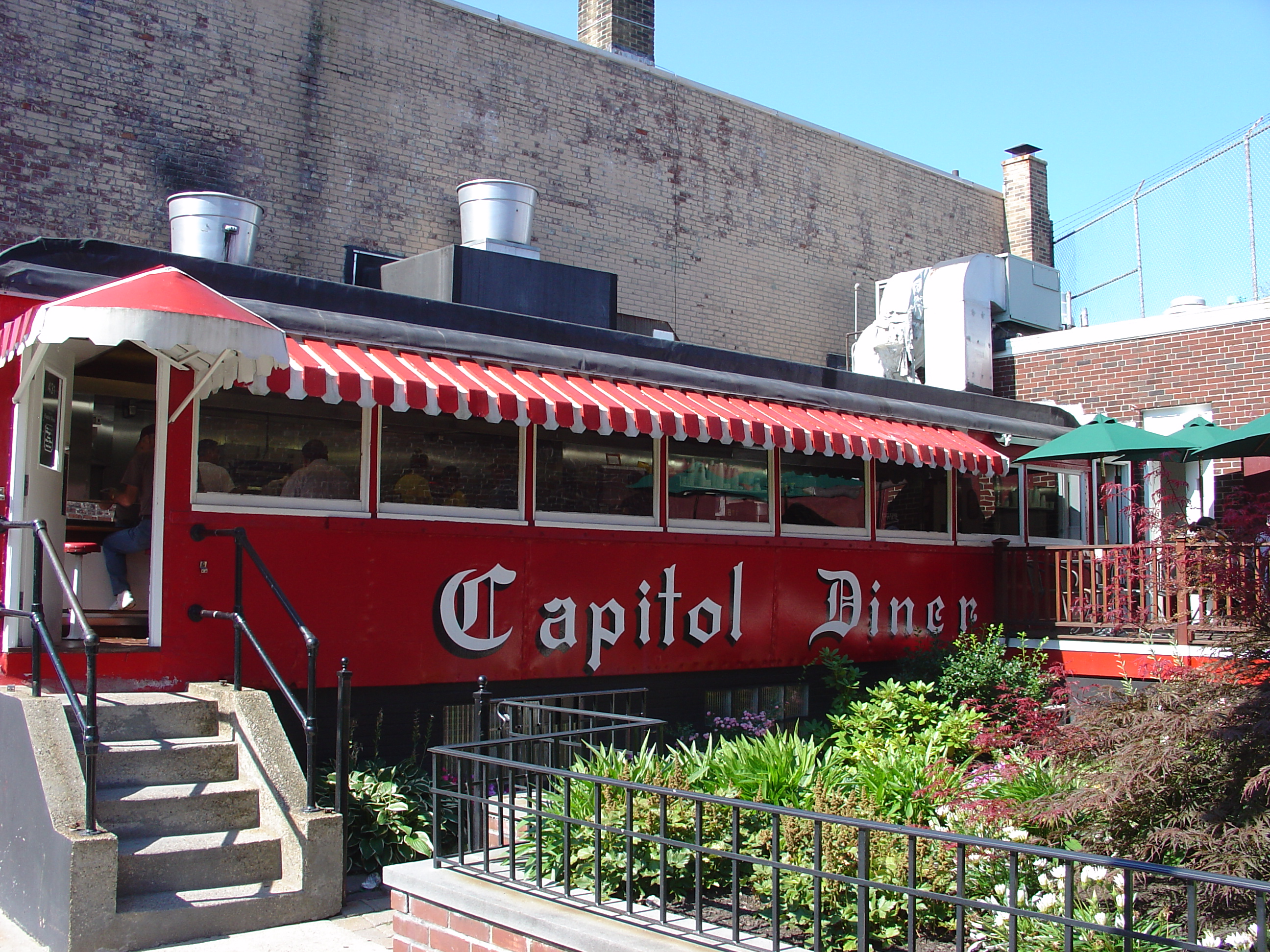

- Location within Massachusetts Location within the United States
- Location: 431 Union St., Lynn, Massachusetts
- Coordinates: 42°27′48″N 70°56′40″W
- Architect: J. G. Brill Company; Wason Manufacturing Company
- MPS: Diners of Massachusetts MPS
- NRHP reference No.: 99001121
- Added to NRHP: September 22, 1999

The Capitol Diner is a historic diner at 431 Union Street in Lynn, Massachusetts. Built in 1928 by the J. G. Brill Company, it is believed to be that company's last operating diner. It was listed on the National Register of Historic Places in 1999.

== Description and history ==
The Capitol Diner is located in downtown Lynn's Central Square area, a short way east of the Lynn MBTA commuter rail station on the west side of Union Street, and just southeast of the elevated viaduct carrying the railroad. It is set on a lot of 1,900 square feet (180 m^{2}), oriented with its long side perpendicular to the street. It rests on a foundation mainly of brick, with a section built out of glass bricks. At the back of the property is a single-story brick building housing the kitchen; the balance of property is landscaped as a courtyard, with a low brick wall at the sidewalk on the right, and a walkway that elevates to provide graded access to the kitchen and the rear diner entrance. The diner entrances are located in the end bays on the long side; that in the front os accessed by a flight of concrete steps. The diner itself is three bays wide and ten long, and is covered by a monitor-style roof with covered-over clerestory windows. The interior of the diner retains a significant number of early features, despite damage caused by a fire in 1978.

The site where the diner is located was documented to house a dining establishment as early as 1898, when it was the site of a "lunch wagon". The Wason Manufacturing Company, a Massachusetts-based subsidiary of the J. G. Brill Company of Philadelphia, Pennsylvania, built the diner unit in 1928. It was permanently set in place, with the existing foundation and kitchen building, by 1934. The restaurant was originally named the "Miss Lynn Diner" and after it was sold in 1938, it was renamed the "Capitol Diner" after the Capitol Theatre formerly across the street. It is believed to be the last operating Brill Diner in the United States. The diner is owned by Robert Fennell, and has been in his family since 1938.

== See also ==
- National Register of Historic Places listings in Lynn, Massachusetts
- National Register of Historic Places listings in Essex County, Massachusetts
- List of diners
