= North Shore Community College =

Public college in Massachusetts, US

Coordinates: 42°35′24.50″N 70°58′5.50″W

- Type: Public community college
- Established: 1965
- Accreditation: NECHE
- President: William Heineman
- Administrative staff: 800+ (full- and part-time)
- Students: 4,391 (fall 2022)
- Location: Danvers and Lynn, Massachusetts, United States
- Campus: Suburban, Urban
- Nicknames: NSCC, North Shore
- Website: www.northshore.edu

North Shore Community College is a public community college in Massachusetts with campuses in Danvers and Lynn. The college offers over 80 associate degree and certificate programs to approximately 10,000 students a year from the 26 cities and towns along the coastal region from north metropolitan Boston to Cape Ann. North Shore Community College is accredited by the New England Commission of Higher Education.

== See also ==
- List of colleges and universities in Massachusetts
