= Erepsin =

Intestinal enzyme mixture

Erepsin is a mixture of enzymes contained in a protein fraction found in the intestinal juices that digest peptones into amino acids. It is produced and secreted by the intestinal glands in the ileum and the pancreas, but it is also found widely in other cells. However, the term is now rarely used in scientific literature as more precise terms are preferred.

== History ==
Erepsin was discovered at the beginning of the twentieth century by German physiologist Otto Cohnheim (1873-1953) who found a substance that breaks down peptones into amino acid in the intestines. He termed this hypothetical protease in his protein extract "erepsin" in 1901, derived from a Greek word meaning "I break down" (έρείπω). His discovery was significant as it overturned the previous "hypothesis of resynthesis" which proposed that proteins get broken down into peptones from which proteins may then be resynthesized, and helped establish the idea of free amino acids instead of peptones being the building blocks of protein.

Erepsin was originally thought to be a single enzyme or a mixture of a few enzymes involved in the terminal stages of the breakdown of peptides to free amino acids in the intestines. However, it became clear later that erepsin is in fact a complex mixture of different peptidases. It was also found not to be unique to intestinal mucosa and is present widely in many other cells and organisms. The term erepsin fell from use in scientific literature in the latter half of the twentieth century as scientists considered its use as a term for a single enzyme or a few enzymes misleading, and more precise terms such as aminopeptidase, carboxypeptidase and dipeptidase are preferred. The term is now considered obsolete.

== Properties ==
Erepsin may contain dipeptidases, aminopeptidases, occasionally carboxypeptidases, and these include leucyl aminopeptidase, prolinase, prolidase and others. It is often grouped under exopeptidases, proteases that work only on the outermost peptide bonds of a polypeptide chain. The optimum pH for the group of enzymes is around pH 8, but some individual enzymes within this group may be distinguished by their differences in stability and optimum pH.
