= History of civil rights in the United States =

The history of civil rights in the United States consists of noted events such as the passage of legislation and organized efforts to abolish public and private acts of racial and/or religious discrimination against Native Americans, African Americans, Asians, Latin Americans, women, the homeless, practitioners of minority religions, and other groups since the independence of the country.

== Background ==
Many events took place between 1776 and 1866. Some of them were:

=== Slavery in the United States (1776–1866) ===
An animation showing when United States territories and states forbade or allowed slavery, 1789–1861

The institution of slavery in the United States existed since the colonial era when the Atlantic slave trade led to the importation of roughly 450,000 enslaved Africans to various European colonies in North America. After the United States was founded in 1776, slavery continued to exist on a widespread scale in the American South. Since the colonial era, an abolitionist movement existed to oppose American slavery, culminating in the abolition of enslavement in the U.S. during the Civil War.

=== Racial segregation in the United States ===
Racial segregation follows two forms;

- De jure segregation mandated the separation of races by law. Slave codes imposed them before the Civil War and by Black Codes and Jim Crow laws following the war.
- De facto segregation, or segregation "in fact", exists without the sanction of the law.

=== Frederick Douglass and James N. Buffum ===
In 1841, Frederick Douglass and his friend James N. Buffum entered a train car reserved for white passengers in Lynn, Massachusetts. When the conductor ordered them to leave the car, they refused. Following the action, widespread organizing led Congress to approve the Civil Rights Act of 1875, which granted equal rights to Black citizens in public accommodations. In 1883, the Supreme Court overturned this victory, declaring it unconstitutional in the Civil Rights Cases of 1883.

=== Elizabeth Jennings Graham ===
On July 16, 1854, Elizabeth Jennings Graham, a 24-year-old schoolteacher, opted to board a bus without the "Colored Persons Allowed" sign, and the conductor used force to expel her.

=== Charlotte L. Brown ===
In 1863, San Francisco's horse-powered streetcar companies only accepted white passengers. On April 17, 1863, Charlotte L. Brown, an African American citizen began to challenge this discrimination directly and boarded a streetcar of the Omnibus Railroad Company. She was forced off and she tried to do it two more times, but the outcome was the same. Each time she legally sued the company.

=== Demand for women's suffrage in the United States ===
The demand for women's suffrage began to gather strength in the 1840s, emerging from the broader movement for women's rights. In 1848, the Seneca Falls Convention, the first women's rights convention, passed a resolution in favor of women's suffrage despite opposition from some of its organizers, who believed the idea was too extreme. By the time of the first National Women's Rights Convention in 1850, however, suffrage was becoming an increasingly important aspect of the movement's activities.

== Movement for civil rights (1865–1896) ==
The civil rights movement (1865–1896) aimed to eliminate racial discrimination against African Americans, improve their educational and employment opportunities, and establish their electoral power just after the abolition of slavery in the United States. The period from 1865 to 1895 saw tremendous change in the fortunes of the Black community following the elimination of slavery in the South.

=== End of slavery in the United States of America ===
The Emancipation Proclamation was an executive order issued by President Abraham Lincoln on January 1, 1863. In a single stroke, it changed the legal status, as recognized by the U.S. government, of three million enslaved people in designated areas of the Confederacy from "slave" to "free". It had the practical effect that as soon as an enslaved person escaped the control of the Confederate government by running away or through advances of the federal Union Army, the enslaved person became legally and, in effect, free. Plantation owners, realizing that emancipation would destroy their economic system, sometimes moved the people they enslaved as far as possible out of reach of the Union army. By June 1865, the Union Army controlled all of the Confederacy and liberated all designated enslaved people.

=== Civil Rights Act of 1866 ===
The Civil Rights Act of 1866 was the first United States federal law to define citizenship and affirm that all citizens are equally protected by the law. In the wake of the American Civil War, the Act was mainly intended to protect the civil rights of persons of African descent born in or brought to the United States.

The Act was passed by Congress in 1865 and vetoed by United States President Andrew Johnson. In April 1866, Congress again passed the bill to support the Thirteenth Amendment, and Johnson again vetoed it, but a two-thirds majority in each chamber overrode the veto to allow it to become law without a presidential signature. John Bingham and other congressmen argued that Congress did not yet have sufficient constitutional power to enact this law. Following the passage of the Fourteenth Amendment in 1868, Congress ratified the 1866 Act in 1870. In 1871, they passed the US Civil Rights Act of 1871, also known as the Klan Act. In 1875, the Civil Rights Act of 1875 became law.

=== Katherine "Kate" Brown ===
Katherine Brown boarded a train in Alexandria, Virginia, when traveling towards Washington, D.C., on February 8, 1868. Brown entered "what they call the white people's car." As she was boarding, a railroad policeman told her to move to a different car. She replied, "This car will do." He told her the car she had entered "was for ladies," and "no damned nigger was allowed to ride in that car anyhow; never was and never would be." The railroad police officer and another employee grabbed Brown and, after a violent struggle that lasted six minutes, in which she was beaten and kicked, threw her on the boarding platform, dragged her along the platform, and threatened to arrest her. She asked, "What are you going to arrest me for? What have I done? Have I committed robbery? Have I murdered anybody?" Brown's injuries were so severe that she was bedridden for several weeks and spit up blood from hemorrhages in her lungs. Railroad Company v. Brown (1873), U.S. Senate (June 17, 1868).

Senators Charles Sumner and Justin Morrill called for a formal investigation, and Senator Charles Drake agreed. A resolution was passed on February 10, and a Senate committee heard testimony later that month. Brown sued the railway company for damages and was awarded $1,500 in damages in the district court. The railway company appealed, and the case eventually went before the US Supreme Court. On November 17, 1873, in an opinion delivered by Justice David Davis, the Court held that racial segregation on the railroad line was not allowed under its Congressional charter, which stated "no person shall be excluded from the cars on account of race." Davis dismissed the company's "separate but equal" argument as "an ingenious attempt to evade a compliance with the obvious meaning of the requirement" of the 1863 charter and decided in favor of Brown.

The Court held that white and Black passengers must be treated with equality in the use of the railroad's cars:

It was the discrimination in the use of the cars on account of color where slavery obtained which was the subject of discussion at the time, and not the fact that the colored race could not ride in the cars at all. Congress, in the belief that this discrimination was unjust, acted. It told this company in substance that it could extend its road within the District as desired, but that this discrimination must cease and the colored and white race, in the use of the cars, be placed on an equality. This condition it had the right to impose, and in the temper of Congress at the time, it is manifest the grant could not have been made without it.

== Movement for civil rights from 1896 to 1954 ==
The civil rights movement (1896–1954) was a long, primarily nonviolent series of events to bring full civil rights and equality under the law to all Americans. The era has had a lasting impact on American society – in its tactics, the increased social and legal acceptance of civil rights, and its exposure of the prevalence and cost of racism.

=== Women's suffrage in the United States ===
Women's legal right to vote was established in the United States over the course of more than half a century, first in various states and localities, sometimes on a limited basis, and then nationally in the Nineteenth Amendment of 1920.

=== Universal Declaration of Human Rights (1948) ===
The Universal Declaration of Human Rights (UDHR) is an international document adopted by the United Nations General Assembly that enshrines the rights and freedoms of all human beings. It was accepted by the General Assembly as Resolution 217 during its third session on 10 December 1948 at the Palais de Chaillot in Paris, France.

A foundational text in the history of human and civil rights, the Declaration consists of 30 articles detailing an individual's "basic rights and fundamental freedoms" and affirming their universal character as inherent, inalienable, and applicable to all human beings. Adopted as a "common standard of achievement for all peoples and all nations", the UDHR commits nations to recognize all humans as being "born free and equal in dignity and rights" regardless of "nationality, place of residence, gender, national or ethnic origin, colour, religion, language, or any other status".

The Declaration is considered a "milestone document" for its "universalist language", which makes no reference to a particular culture, political system, or religion. It directly inspired the development of international human rights law and was the first step in the formulation of the International Bill of Human Rights, which was completed in 1966 and came into force in 1976. The United States of America has ratified the nine binding treaties influenced by the Declaration.

== Civil rights movement (1954–1968) ==
The 1954–1968 civil rights movement (Note: The social movement has also been called the American civil rights movement, the 1960s Civil Rights Movement, the African-American civil rights movement, the Afro-American civil rights movement, the American freedom movement, the black civil rights movement, the black revolution, the black rights movement, the civil rights revolution, the modern civil rights movement, the Negro American revolution, the Negro freedom movement, the Negro movement, the Negro revolt, the Negro revolution, the Second Reconstruction, the Southern freedom movement, the United States civil rights movement and the U.S. civil rights movement. The term civil rights struggle can denote this or other social movements that occurred in the United States during the same period. The social movement's span of time is called the civil rights era.) in the United States was preceded by a decades-long campaign by African Americans and their like-minded allies to end legalized racial discrimination, disenfranchisement, and racial segregation in the United States. The movement has origins in the Reconstruction era during the late 19th century, although it made its largest legislative gains in the 1960s after years of direct actions and grassroots protests. The social movement's major nonviolent resistance and civil disobedience campaigns eventually secured new protections in federal law for the human rights of all Americans.

De jure segregation was outlawed by the Civil Rights Act of 1964, the Voting Rights Act of 1965, and the Fair Housing Act of 1968. In specific areas, however, segregation was barred earlier by the Warren Court in decisions such as the Brown v. Board of Education decision that overturned school segregation in the United States.

=== Brown v. Board of Education (1954) ===
In the spring of 1951, black students in Virginia protested their unequal status in the state's segregated educational system. Students at Moton High School protested the overcrowded conditions and failing facility. Some local leaders of the NAACP had tried to persuade the students to back down from their protest against the Jim Crow laws of school segregation. When the students did not budge, the NAACP joined their battle against school segregation. The NAACP proceeded with five cases challenging the school systems; these were later combined under what is known today as Brown v. Board of Education. Under the leadership of Walter Reuther, the United Auto Workers donated $75,000 to help pay for the NAACP's efforts at the Supreme Court.

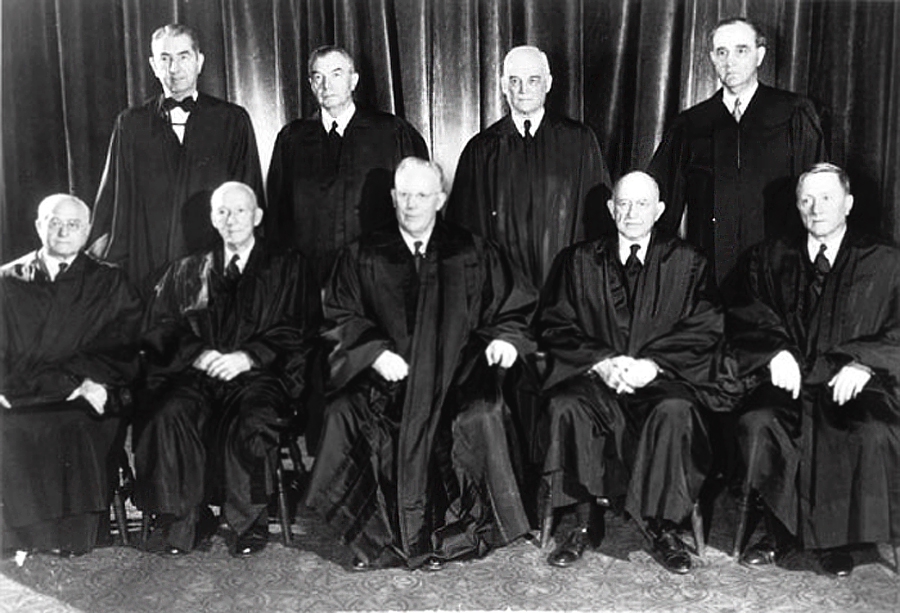
In 1954, the U.S. Supreme Court under Chief Justice Earl Warren ruled unanimously that racial segregation in public schools was unconstitutional.

On May 17, 1954, the U.S. Supreme Court under Chief Justice Earl Warren ruled unanimously in Brown v. Board of Education of Topeka, Kansas, that mandating, or even permitting, public schools to be segregated by race was unconstitutional. Chief Justice Warren wrote in the court majority opinion that

Segregation of white and colored children in public schools has a detrimental effect upon the colored children. The impact is greater when it has the sanction of the law; for the policy of separating the races is usually interpreted as denoting the inferiority of the Negro group.

The lawyers from the NAACP had to gather plausible evidence in order to win the case of Brown vs. Board of Education. Their method of addressing the issue of school segregation was to enumerate several arguments. One pertained to having exposure to interracial contact in a school environment. It was argued that interracial contact would, in turn, help prepare children to live with the pressures that society exerts in regard to race and thereby afford them a better chance of living in a democracy. In addition, another argument emphasized how "'education' comprehends the entire process of developing and training the mental, physical and moral powers and capabilities of human beings".

Risa Goluboff wrote that the NAACP's intention was to show the Courts that African American children were the victims of school segregation and their futures were at risk. The Court ruled that both Plessy v. Ferguson (1896), which had established the "separate but equal" standard in general, and Cumming v. Richmond County Board of Education (1899), which had applied that standard to schools, was unconstitutional.

The federal government filed a friend of the court brief in the case urging the justices to consider the effect that segregation had on America's image in the Cold War. Secretary of State Dean Acheson was quoted in the brief stating that "The United States is under constant attack in the foreign press, over the foreign radio, and in such international bodies as the United Nations because of various practices of discrimination in this country."

The following year, in the case known as Brown II, the Court ordered segregation to be phased out over time, "with all deliberate speed". Brown v. Board of Education of Topeka, Kansas (1954) did not overturn Plessy v. Ferguson (1896). Plessy v. Ferguson was segregation in transportation modes. Brown v. Board of Education dealt with segregation in education. Brown v. Board of Education did set in motion the future overturning of 'separate but equal'.

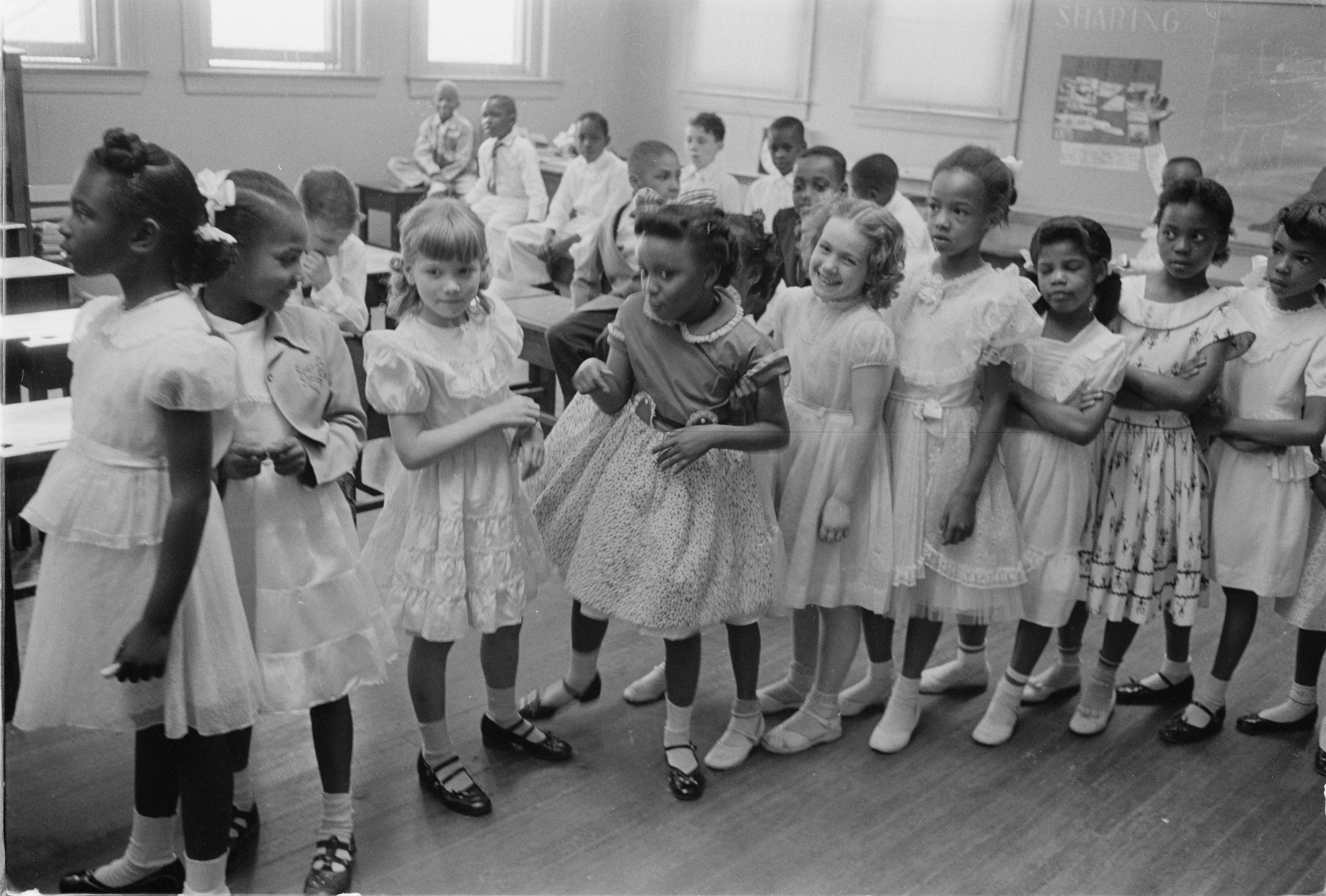
School integration, Barnard School, Washington, D.C., 1955

On May 18, 1954, Greensboro, North Carolina, became the first city in the South to publicly announce that it would abide by the Supreme Court's Brown v. Board of Education ruling. "It is unthinkable,' remarked School Board Superintendent Benjamin Smith, 'that we will try to [override] the laws of the United States." This positive reception for Brown, together with the appointment of African American David Jones to the school board in 1953, convinced numerous white and black citizens that Greensboro was heading in a progressive direction. Integration in Greensboro occurred rather peacefully compared to the process in Southern states such as Alabama, Arkansas, and Virginia where "massive resistance" was practiced by top officials and throughout the states. In Virginia, some counties closed their public schools rather than integrate, and many white Christian private schools were founded to accommodate students who used to go to public schools. Even in Greensboro, much local resistance to desegregation continued, and in 1969, the federal government found the city was not in compliance with the 1964 Civil Rights Act. Transition to a fully integrated school system did not begin until 1971.

Many Northern cities also had de facto segregation policies, which resulted in a vast gulf in educational resources between black and white communities. In Harlem, New York, for example, neither a single new school was built since the turn of the century, nor did a single nursery school exist – even as the Second Great Migration was causing overcrowding. Existing schools tended to be dilapidated and staffed with inexperienced teachers. Brown helped stimulate activism among New York City parents like Mae Mallory who, with the support of the NAACP, initiated a successful lawsuit against the city and state on Brown's principles. Mallory and thousands of other parents bolstered the pressure of the lawsuit with a school boycott in 1959. During the boycott, some of the first freedom schools of the period were established. The city responded to the campaign by permitting more open transfers to high-quality, historically white schools. (New York's African-American community, and Northern desegregation activists generally, now found themselves contending with the problem of white flight, however.)

=== Murder of Emmett Till (1955) ===
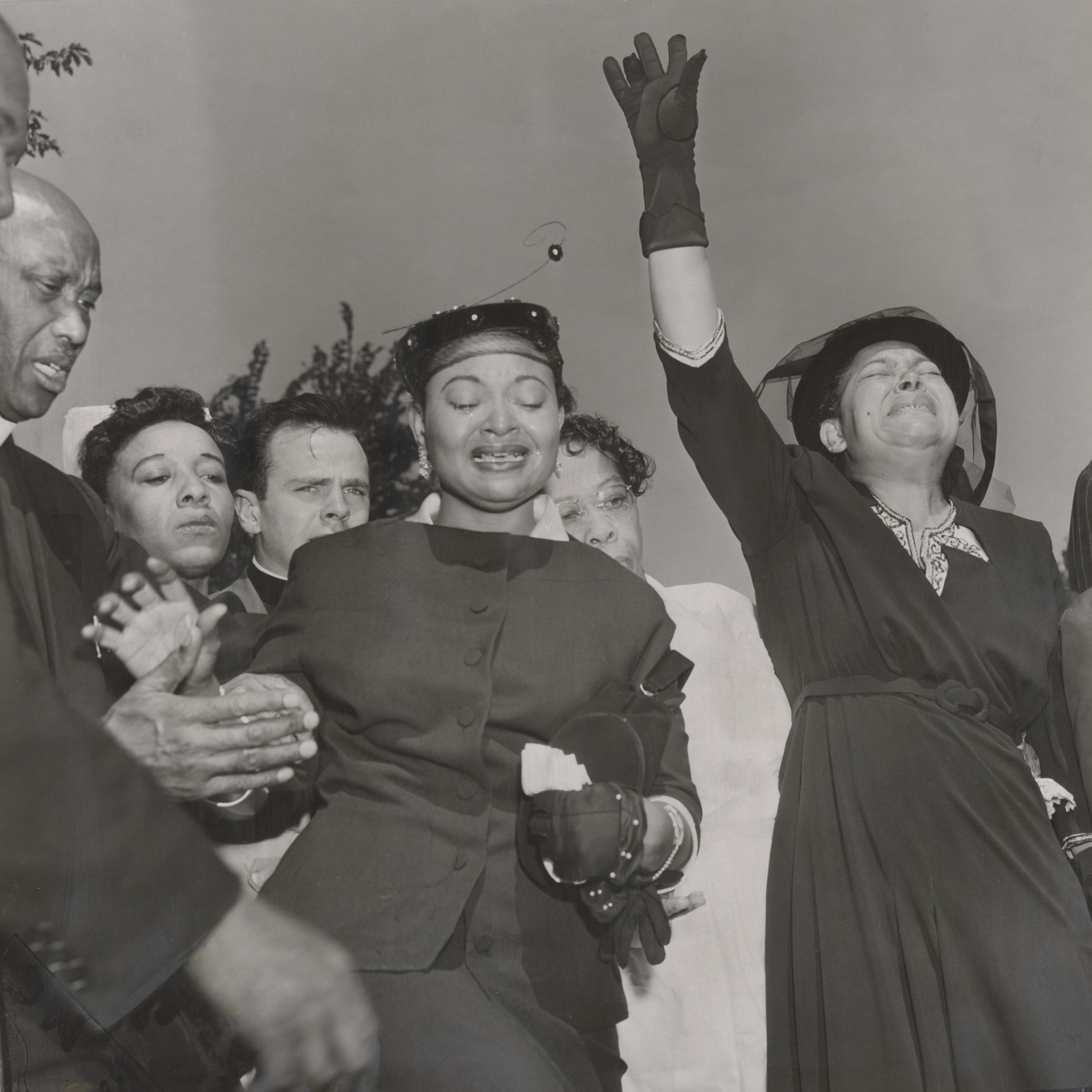
Emmett Till's mother Mamie (middle) at her son's funeral in 1955. He was killed by white men after a white woman accused him of offending her in her family's grocery store.

Emmett Till, a 14-year-old African American from Chicago, visited his relatives in Money, Mississippi, for the summer. He allegedly had an interaction with a white woman, Carolyn Bryant, in a small grocery store that violated the norms of Mississippi culture, and Bryant's husband Roy and his half-brother J. W. Milam brutally murdered young Emmett Till. They beat and mutilated him before shooting him in the head and sinking his body in the Tallahatchie River. Three days later, Till's body was discovered and retrieved from the river. After Emmett's mother, Mamie Till, came to identify the remains of her son, she decided she wanted to "let the people see what I have seen". Till's mother then had his body taken back to Chicago where she had it displayed in an open casket during the funeral services where many thousands of visitors arrived to show their respects. A later publication of an image at the funeral in Jet is credited as a crucial moment in the civil rights era for displaying in vivid detail the violent racism that was being directed at black people in America. In a column for The Atlantic, Vann R. Newkirk wrote: "The trial of his killers became a pageant illuminating the tyranny of white supremacy". The state of Mississippi tried two defendants, but they were speedily acquitted by an all-white jury.

"Emmett's murder," historian Tim Tyson writes, "would never have become a watershed historical moment without Mamie finding the strength to make her private grief a public matter." The visceral response to his mother's decision to have an open-casket funeral mobilized the black community throughout the U.S. The murder and resulting trial ended up markedly impacting the views of several young black activists. Joyce Ladner referred to such activists as the "Emmett Till generation." One hundred days after Emmett Till's murder, Rosa Parks refused to give up her seat on the bus in Montgomery, Alabama. Parks later informed Till's mother that her decision to stay in her seat was guided by the image she still vividly recalled of Till's brutalized remains. The glass topped casket that was used for Till's Chicago funeral was found in a cemetery garage in 2009. Till had been reburied in a different casket after being exhumed in 2005. Till's family decided to donate the original casket to the Smithsonian's National Museum of African American Culture and History, where it is now on display. In 2007, Bryant said that she had fabricated the most sensational part of her story in 1955.

=== Rosa Parks and the Montgomery bus boycott (1955–1956) ===
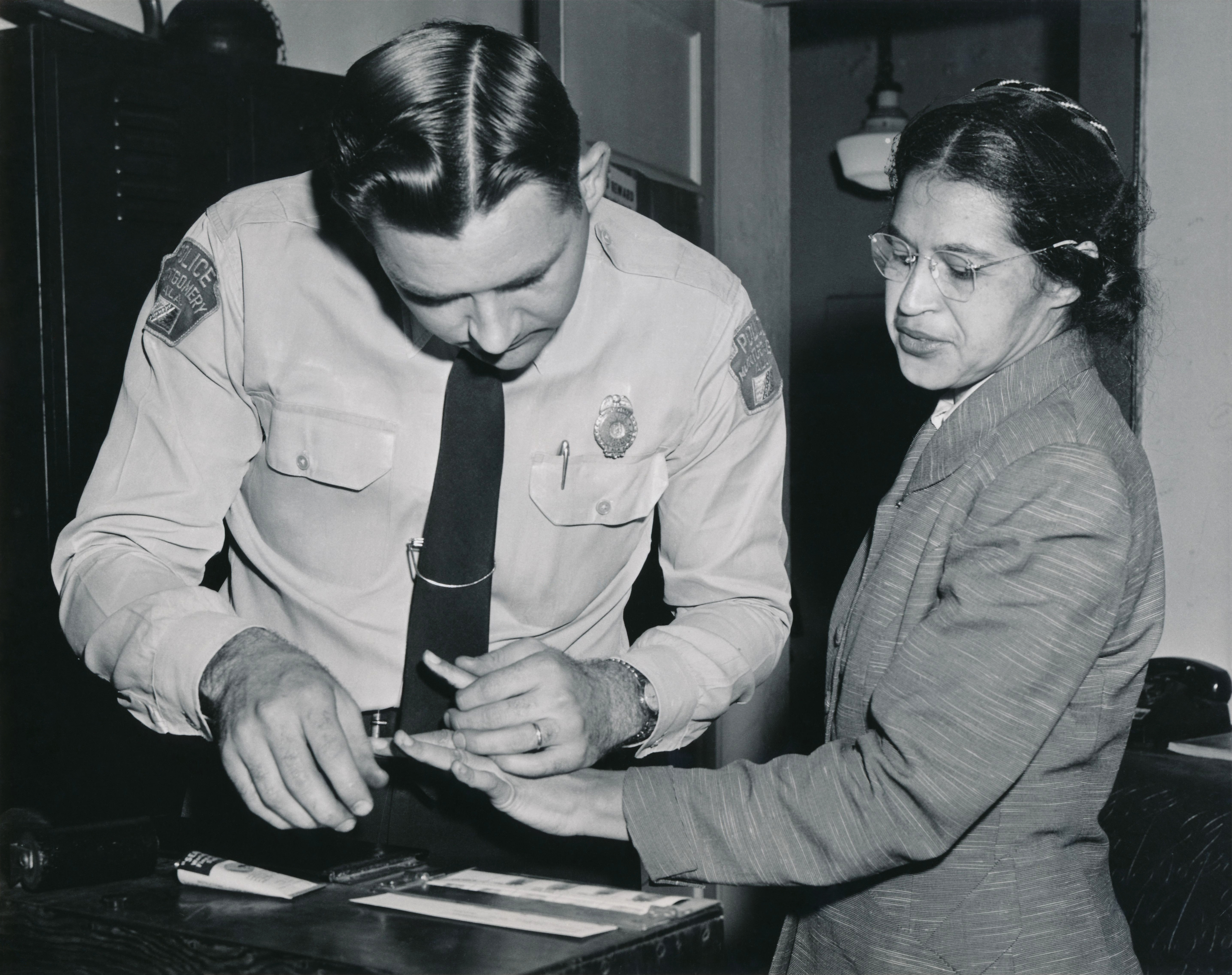
Rosa Parks being fingerprinted after being arrested for not giving up her seat on a bus to a white person.

On December 1, 1955, nine months after a 15-year-old high school student, Claudette Colvin, refused to give up her seat to a white passenger on a public bus in Montgomery, Alabama, and was arrested, Rosa Parks did the same thing. Parks soon became the symbol of the resulting Montgomery bus boycott and received national publicity. She was later hailed as the "mother of the civil rights movement".

Parks was secretary of the Montgomery NAACP chapter and had recently returned from a meeting at the Highlander Folk School in Tennessee where nonviolence as a strategy was taught by Myles Horton and others. After Parks' arrest, African Americans gathered and organized the Montgomery bus boycott to demand a bus system in which passengers would be treated equally. The organization was led by Jo Ann Robinson, a member of the Women's Political Council who had been waiting for the opportunity to boycott the bus system. Following Rosa Parks' arrest, Jo Ann Robinson mimeographed 52,500 leaflets calling for a boycott. They were distributed around the city and helped gather the attention of civil rights leaders. After the city rejected many of its suggested reforms, the NAACP, led by E. D. Nixon, pushed for full desegregation of public buses. With the support of most of Montgomery's 50,000 African Americans, the boycott lasted for 381 days, until the local ordinance segregating African Americans and whites on public buses was repealed. Ninety percent of African Americans in Montgomery partook in the boycotts, which reduced bus revenue significantly, as they comprised the majority of the riders. This movement also sparked riots leading up to the 1956 Sugar Bowl. In November 1956, the United States Supreme Court upheld a district court ruling in the case of Browder v. Gayle and ordered Montgomery's buses desegregated, ending the boycott.

Local leaders established the Montgomery Improvement Association to focus their efforts. Martin Luther King Jr. was elected President of this organization. The lengthy protest attracted national attention for him and the city. His eloquent appeals to Christian brotherhood and American idealism created a positive impression on people both inside and outside the South.

=== Little Rock Nine (1957) ===
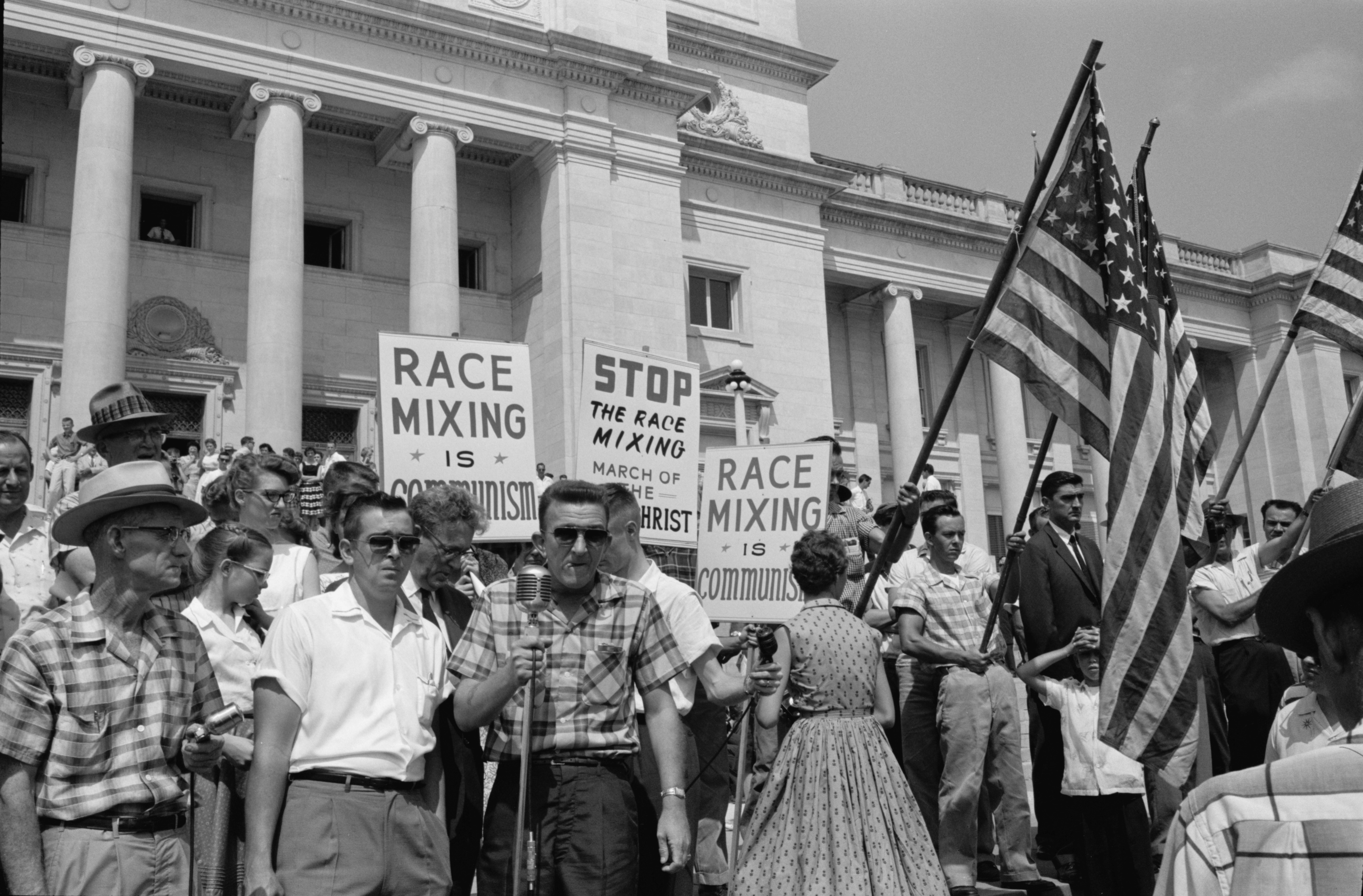
White parents rally against integrating Little Rock's schools in August 1959.

The Little Rock Nine were a group of nine students who attended segregated black high schools in Little Rock, the capital of the state of Arkansas. They each volunteered when the NAACP and the national civil rights movement obtained federal court orders to integrate the prestigious Little Rock Central High School in September, 1957. The Nine faced intense harassment and threats of violence from white parents and students, as well as organized white supremacy groups. The enraged opposition emphasized miscegenation as the threat to white society. Arkansas Governor, Orval Faubus, claiming his only goal was to preserve the peace, deployed the Arkansas National Guard to prevent the black students from entering the school. Faubus defied federal court orders, whereupon President Dwight D. Eisenhower intervened. He federalized the Arkansas National Guard and sent them home. Then he sent in an elite Army unit to escort the students to school and protect them between classes during the 1957–58 school year. In class, however, the Nine were teased and ridiculed every day. In the city compromise efforts all failed and political tensions continued to fester. A year later in September 1958 the Supreme Court ruled that all the city's high schools had to be integrated immediately. Governor Faubus and the legislature responded by immediately shutting down all the public high schools in the city for the entire 1958–1959 school year, despite the harm it did to all the students. The decision to integrate the school was a landmark event in the civil rights movement, and the students' bravery and determination in the face of violent opposition is remembered as a key moment in American history. The city and state were entangled in very expensive legal disputes for decades, while suffering a reputation for hatred and obstruction.

=== Method of nonviolence and nonviolence training ===
During the time period considered to be the "African-American civil rights" era, the predominant use of protest was nonviolent, or peaceful. Often referred to as pacifism, the method of nonviolence is considered to be an attempt to impact society positively. Although acts of racial discrimination have occurred historically throughout the United States, perhaps the most violent regions have been in the former Confederate states. During the 1950s and 1960s, the nonviolent protesting of the civil rights movement caused definite tension, which gained national attention.

In order to prepare for protests physically and psychologically, demonstrators received training in nonviolence. According to former civil rights activist Bruce Hartford, there are two main components of nonviolence training. There is the philosophical method, which involves understanding the method of nonviolence and why it is considered useful, and there is the tactical method, which ultimately teaches demonstrators "how to be a protestor—how to sit-in, how to picket, how to defend yourself against attack, giving training on how to remain cool when people are screaming racist insults into your face and pouring stuff on you and hitting you" (Civil Rights Movement Archive). The philosophical basis of the practice of nonviolence in the American civil rights movement was largely inspired by Mahatma Gandhi's "non-cooperation" policies during his involvement in the Indian independence movement, which were intended to gain attention so that the public would either "intervene in advance" or "provide public pressure in support of the action to be taken" (Erikson, 415). As Hartford explains it, philosophical nonviolence training aims to "shape the individual person's attitude and mental response to crises and violence" (Civil Rights Movement Archive). Hartford and activists like him, who trained in tactical nonviolence, considered it necessary in order to ensure physical safety, instill discipline, teach demonstrators how to demonstrate, and form mutual confidence among demonstrators (Civil Rights Movement Archive).

For many, the concept of nonviolent protest was a way of life, a culture. However, not everyone agreed with this notion. James Forman, former SNCC (and later Black Panther) member, and nonviolence trainer was among those who did not. In his autobiography, The Making of Black Revolutionaries, Forman revealed his perspective on the method of nonviolence as "strictly a tactic, not a way of life without limitations." Similarly, Bob Moses, who was also an active member of SNCC, felt that the method of nonviolence was practical. When interviewed by author Robert Penn Warren, Moses said "There's no question that he (Martin Luther King Jr.) had a great deal of influence with the masses. But I don't think it's in the direction of love. It's in a practical direction … ." (Who Speaks for the Negro? Warren).

According to a 2020 study in the American Political Science Review, nonviolent civil rights protests boosted vote shares for the Democratic party in presidential elections in nearby counties, but violent protests substantially boosted white support for Republicans in counties near to the violent protests.

=== Sit-ins (1958–1960) ===
In July 1958, the NAACP Youth Council sponsored sit-ins at the lunch counter of a Dockum Drug Store in downtown Wichita, Kansas. After three weeks, the movement successfully got the store to change its policy of segregated seating, and soon afterward all Dockum stores in Kansas were desegregated. This movement was quickly followed in the same year by a student sit-in at a Katz Drug Store in Oklahoma City led by Clara Luper, which also was successful.

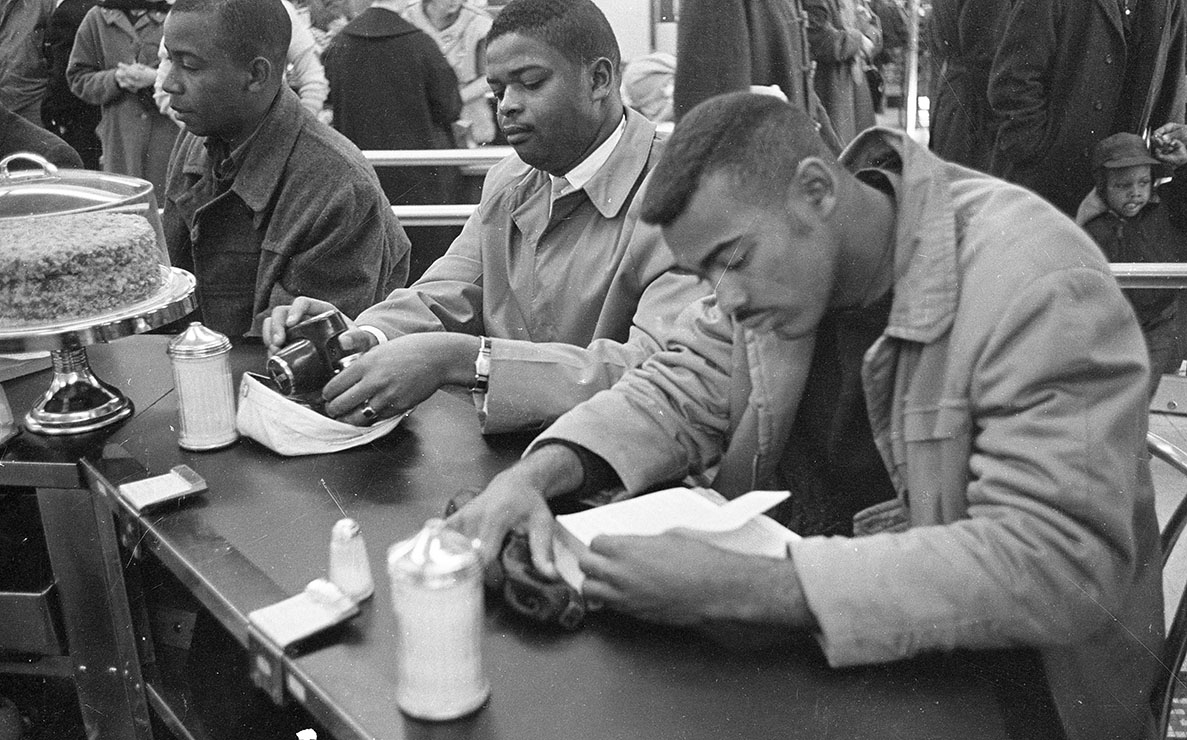
Student sit-in at Woolworth in Durham, North Carolina on February 10, 1960.

Mostly black students from area colleges led a sit-in at a Woolworth's store in Greensboro, North Carolina. On February 1, 1960, four students, Ezell A. Blair Jr., David Richmond, Joseph McNeil, and Franklin McCain from North Carolina Agricultural & Technical College, an all-black college, sat down at the segregated lunch counter to protest Woolworth's policy of excluding African Americans from being served food there. The four students purchased small items in other parts of the store and kept their receipts, then sat down at the lunch counter and asked to be served. After being denied service, they produced their receipts and asked why their money was good everywhere else at the store, but not at the lunch counter.

The protesters had been encouraged to dress professionally, to sit quietly, and to occupy every other stool so that potential white sympathizers could join in. The Greensboro sit-in was quickly followed by other sit-ins in Richmond, Virginia; Nashville, Tennessee; and Atlanta, Georgia. The most immediately effective of these was in Nashville, where hundreds of well organized and highly disciplined college students conducted sit-ins in coordination with a boycott campaign. As students across the south began to "sit-in" at the lunch counters of local stores, police and other officials sometimes used brutal force to physically escort the demonstrators from the lunch facilities.

The "sit-in" technique was not new—as far back as 1939, African-American attorney Samuel Wilbert Tucker organized a sit-in at the then-segregated Alexandria, Virginia, library. In 1960 the technique succeeded in bringing national attention to the movement. On March 9, 1960, an Atlanta University Center group of students released An Appeal for Human Rights as a full-page advertisement in newspapers, including the Atlanta Constitution, Atlanta Journal, and Atlanta Daily World. Known as the Committee on Appeal for Human Rights (COAHR), the group initiated the Atlanta Student Movement and began to lead sit-ins starting on March 15, 1960. By the end of 1960, the process of sit-ins had spread to every southern and border state, and even to facilities in Nevada, Illinois, and Ohio that discriminated against blacks.

Demonstrators focused not only on lunch counters but also on parks, beaches, libraries, theaters, museums, and other public facilities. In April 1960 activists who had led these sit-ins were invited by SCLC activist Ella Baker to hold a conference at Shaw University, a historically black university in Raleigh, North Carolina. This conference led to the formation of the Student Nonviolent Coordinating Committee (SNCC). SNCC took these tactics of nonviolent confrontation further, and organized the freedom rides. As the constitution protected interstate commerce, they decided to challenge segregation on interstate buses and in public bus facilities by putting interracial teams on them, to travel from the North through the segregated South.

=== Freedom Rides (1961) ===
Freedom Rides were journeys by civil rights activists on interstate buses into the segregated southern United States to test the United States Supreme Court decision Boynton v. Virginia (1960), which ruled that segregation was unconstitutional for passengers engaged in interstate travel. Organized by CORE, the first Freedom Ride of the 1960s left Washington D.C. on May 4, 1961, and was scheduled to arrive in New Orleans on May 17.

During the first and subsequent Freedom Rides, activists traveled through the Deep South to integrate seating patterns on buses and desegregate bus terminals, including restrooms and water fountains. That proved to be a dangerous mission. In Anniston, Alabama, one bus was firebombed, forcing its passengers to flee for their lives.

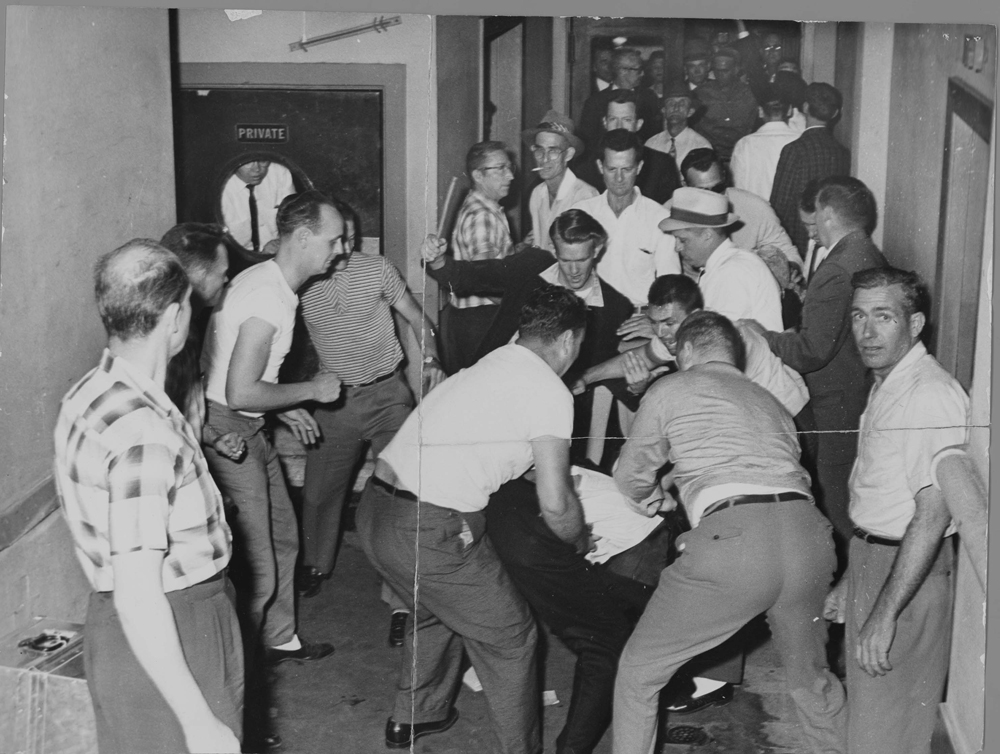
A mob beats Freedom Riders in Birmingham. This picture was reclaimed by the FBI from a local journalist who also was beaten and whose camera was smashed.

In Birmingham, Alabama, an FBI informant reported that Public Safety Commissioner Eugene "Bull" Connor gave Ku Klux Klan members fifteen minutes to attack an incoming group of freedom riders before having police "protect" them. The riders were severely beaten "until it looked like a bulldog had got a hold of them." James Peck, a white activist, was beaten so badly that he required fifty stitches to his head.

In a similar occurrence in Montgomery, Alabama, the Freedom Riders followed in the footsteps of Rosa Parks and rode an integrated Greyhound bus from Birmingham. Although they were protesting interstate bus segregation in peace, they were met with violence in Montgomery as a large, white mob attacked them for their activism. They caused an enormous, 2-hour long riot which resulted in 22 injuries, five of whom were hospitalized.

Mob violence in Anniston and Birmingham temporarily halted the rides. SNCC activists from Nashville brought in new riders to continue the journey from Birmingham to New Orleans. In Montgomery, Alabama, at the Greyhound Bus Station, a mob charged another busload of riders, knocking John Lewis unconscious with a crate and smashing Life photographer Don Urbrock in the face with his own camera. A dozen men surrounded James Zwerg, a white student from Fisk University, and beat him in the face with a suitcase, knocking out his teeth.

On May 24, 1961, the freedom riders continued their rides into Jackson, Mississippi, where they were arrested for "breaching the peace" by using "white only" facilities. New Freedom Rides were organized by many different organizations and continued to flow into the South. As riders arrived in Jackson, they were arrested. By the end of summer, more than 300 had been jailed in Mississippi.

… When the weary Riders arrive in Jackson and attempt to use "white only" restrooms and lunch counters they are immediately arrested for Breach of Peace and Refusal to Obey an Officer. Says Mississippi Governor Ross Barnett in defense of segregation: "The Negro is different because God made him different to punish him." From lockup, the Riders announce "Jail No Bail"—they will not pay fines for unconstitutional arrests and illegal convictions—and by staying in jail they keep the issue alive. Each prisoner will remain in jail for 39 days, the maximum time they can serve without losing their right to appeal the unconstitutionality of their arrests, trials, and convictions. After 39 days, they file an appeal and post bond...

The jailed freedom riders were treated harshly, crammed into tiny, filthy cells and sporadically beaten. In Jackson, some male prisoners were forced to do hard labor in 100 °F (38 °C) heat. Others were transferred to the Mississippi State Penitentiary at Parchman, where they were treated to harsh conditions. Sometimes the men were suspended by "wrist breakers" from the walls. Typically, the windows of their cells were shut tight on hot days, making it hard for them to breathe.

Public sympathy and support for the freedom riders led John F. Kennedy's administration to order the Interstate Commerce Commission (ICC) to issue a new desegregation order. When the new ICC rule took effect on November 1, 1961, passengers were permitted to sit wherever they chose on the bus; "white" and "colored" signs came down in the terminals; separate drinking fountains, toilets, and waiting rooms were consolidated; and lunch counters began serving people regardless of skin color.

The student movement involved such celebrated figures as John Lewis, a single-minded activist; James Lawson, the revered "guru" of nonviolent theory and tactics; Diane Nash, an articulate and intrepid public champion of justice; Bob Moses, pioneer of voting registration in Mississippi; and James Bevel, a fiery preacher and charismatic organizer, strategist, and facilitator. Other prominent student activists included Dion Diamond, Charles McDew, Bernard Lafayette, Charles Jones, Lonnie King, Julian Bond, Hosea Williams, and Stokely Carmichael.

=== Voter registration organizing ===
After the Freedom Rides, local black leaders in Mississippi such as Amzie Moore, Aaron Henry, Medgar Evers, and others asked SNCC to help register black voters and to build community organizations that could win a share of political power in the state. Since Mississippi ratified its new constitution in 1890 with provisions such as poll taxes, residency requirements, and literacy tests, it made registration more complicated and stripped blacks from voter rolls and voting. Also, violence at the time of elections had earlier suppressed black voting.

By the mid-20th century, preventing blacks from voting had become an essential part of the culture of white supremacy. In June and July 1959, members of the black community in Fayette County, TN formed the Fayette County Civic and Welfare League to spur voting. At the time, there were 16,927 blacks in the county, yet only 17 of them had voted in the previous seven years. Within a year, some 1,400 blacks had registered, and the white community responded with harsh economic reprisals. Using registration rolls, the White Citizens Council circulated a blacklist of all registered black voters, allowing banks, local stores, and gas stations to conspire to deny registered black voters essential services. What's more, sharecropping blacks who registered to vote were getting evicted from their homes. All in all, the number of evictions came to 257 families, many of whom were forced to live in a makeshift Tent City for well over a year. Finally, in December 1960, the Justice Department invoked its powers authorized by the Civil Rights Act of 1957 to file a suit against seventy parties accused of violating the civil rights of black Fayette County citizens. In the following year the first voter registration project in McComb and the surrounding counties in the Southwest corner of the state. Their efforts were met with violent repression from state and local lawmen, the White Citizens' Council, and the Ku Klux Klan. Activists were beaten, there were hundreds of arrests of local citizens, and the voting activist Herbert Lee was murdered.

White opposition to black voter registration was so intense in Mississippi that Freedom Movement activists concluded that all of the state's civil rights organizations had to unite in a coordinated effort to have any chance of success. In February 1962, representatives of SNCC, CORE, and the NAACP formed the Council of Federated Organizations (COFO). At a subsequent meeting in August, SCLC became part of COFO.

In the Spring of 1962, with funds from the Voter Education Project, SNCC/COFO began voter registration organizing in the Mississippi Delta area around Greenwood, and the areas surrounding Hattiesburg, Laurel, and Holly Springs. As in McComb, their efforts were met with fierce opposition—arrests, beatings, shootings, arson, and murder. Registrars used the literacy test to keep blacks off the voting roles by creating standards that even highly educated people could not meet. In addition, employers fired blacks who tried to register, and landlords evicted them from their rental homes. Despite these actions, over the following years, the black voter registration campaign spread across the state.

Similar voter registration campaigns—with similar responses—were begun by SNCC, CORE, and SCLC in Louisiana, Alabama, southwest Georgia, and South Carolina. By 1963, voter registration campaigns in the South were as integral to the Freedom Movement as desegregation efforts. After the passage of the Civil Rights Act of 1964, protecting and facilitating voter registration despite state barriers became the main effort of the movement. It resulted in the passage of the Voting Rights Act of 1965, which had provisions to enforce the constitutional right to vote for all citizens.

=== Integration of Mississippi universities (1956–1965) ===
Beginning in 1956, Clyde Kennard, a black Korean War-veteran, wanted to enroll at Mississippi Southern College (now the University of Southern Mississippi) at Hattiesburg under the G.I. Bill. William David McCain, the college president, used the Mississippi State Sovereignty Commission, in order to prevent his enrollment by appealing to local black leaders and the segregationist state political establishment.

The state-funded organization tried to counter the civil rights movement by positively portraying segregationist policies. More significantly, it collected data on activists, harassed them legally, and used economic boycotts against them by threatening their jobs (or causing them to lose their jobs) to try to suppress their work.

Kennard was twice arrested on trumped-up charges, and eventually convicted and sentenced to seven years in the state prison. After three years at hard labor, Kennard was paroled by Mississippi Governor Ross Barnett. Journalists had investigated his case and publicized the state's mistreatment of his colon cancer.

McCain's role in Kennard's arrests and convictions is unknown. While trying to prevent Kennard's enrollment, McCain made a speech in Chicago, with his travel sponsored by the Mississippi State Sovereignty Commission. He described the blacks' seeking to desegregate Southern schools as "imports" from the North. (Kennard was a native and resident of Hattiesburg.) McCain said:

We insist that educationally and socially, we maintain a segregated society...In all fairness, I admit that we are not encouraging Negro voting...The Negroes prefer that control of the government remain in the white man's hands.

Note: Mississippi had passed a new constitution in 1890 that effectively disfranchised most blacks by changing electoral and voter registration requirements; although it deprived them of constitutional rights authorized under post-Civil War amendments, it survived U.S. Supreme Court challenges at the time. It was not until after the passage of the 1965 Voting Rights Act that most blacks in Mississippi and other southern states gained federal protection to enforce the constitutional right of citizens to vote.

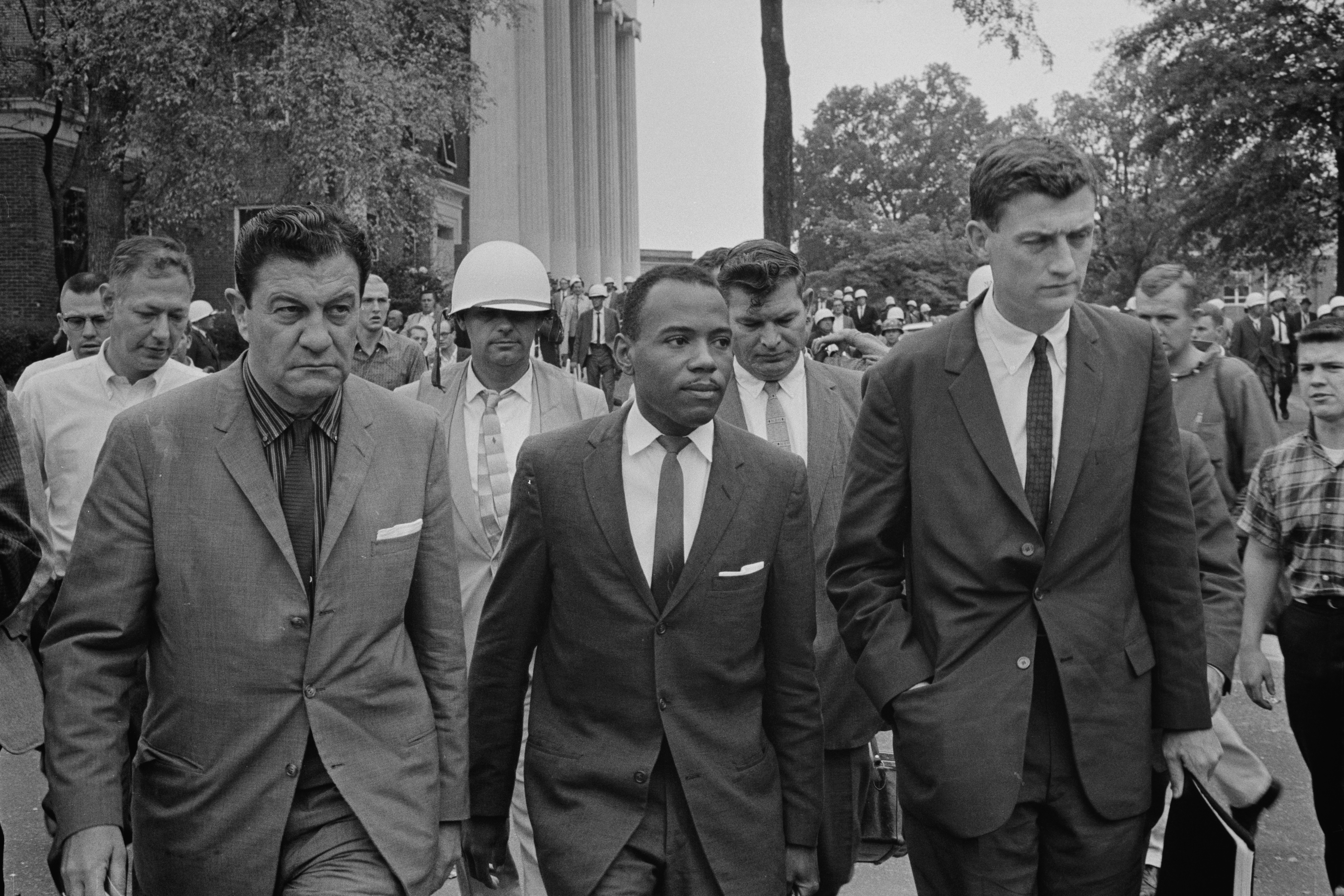
James Meredith walking to class accompanied by a U.S. Marshal and a Justice Department official.

In September 1962, James Meredith won a lawsuit to secure admission to the previously segregated University of Mississippi. He attempted to enter campus on September 20, on September 25, and again on September 26. He was blocked by Governor Ross Barnett, who said, "[N]o school will be integrated in Mississippi while I am your Governor." The Fifth U.S. Circuit Court of Appeals held Barnett and Lieutenant Governor Paul B. Johnson Jr. in contempt, ordering them arrested and fined more than $10,000 for each day they refused to allow Meredith to enroll.

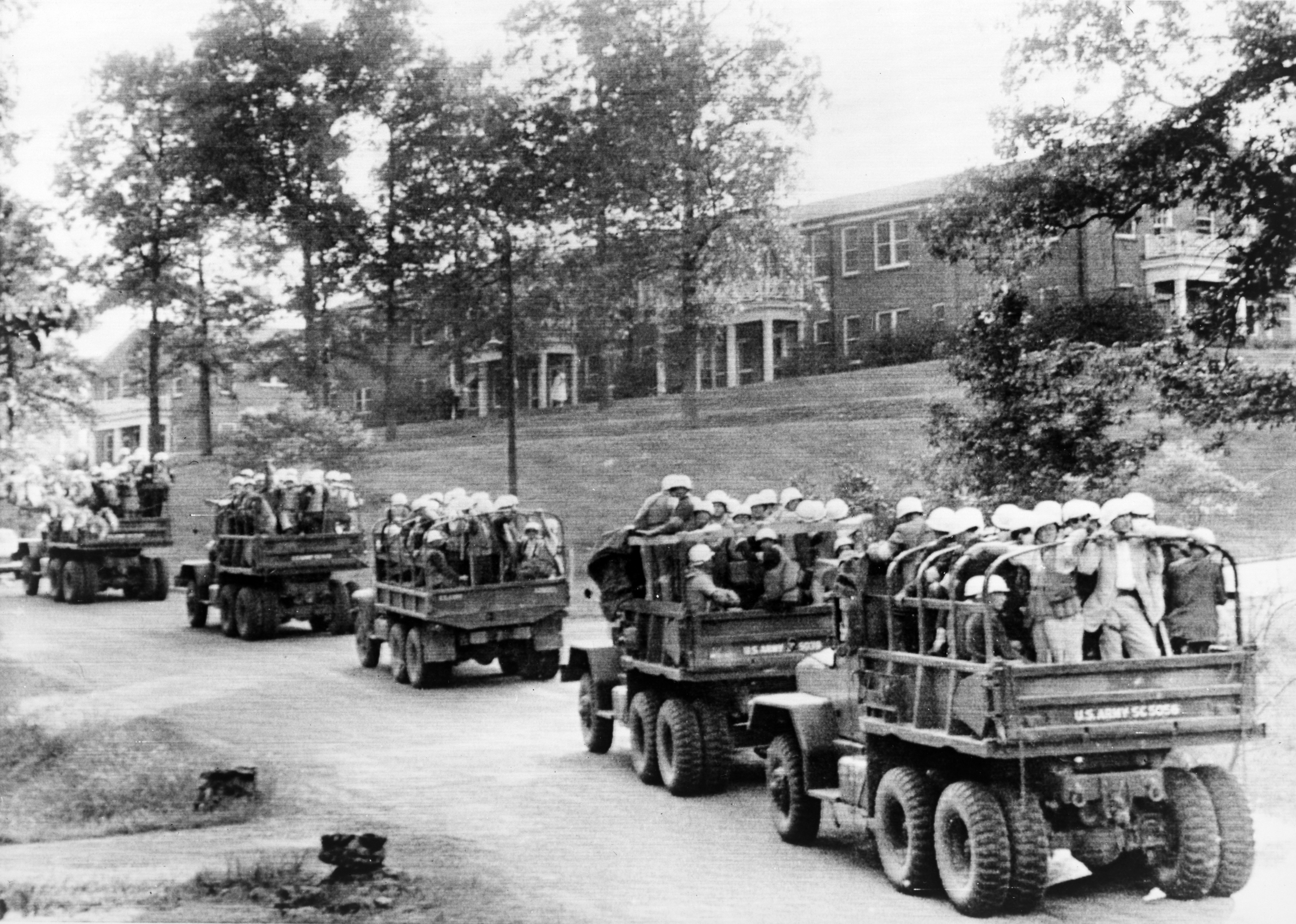
U.S. Army trucks loaded with Federal law enforcement personnel on the University of Mississippi campus, 1962.

Attorney General Robert F. Kennedy sent in a force of U.S. Marshals and deputized U.S. Border Patrol agents and Federal Bureau of Prisons officers. On September 30, 1962, Meredith entered the campus under their escort. Students and other whites began rioting that evening, throwing rocks and firing on the federal agents guarding Meredith at Lyceum Hall. Rioters ended up killing two civilians, including a French journalist; 28 federal agents suffered gunshot wounds, and 160 others were injured. President John F. Kennedy sent U.S. Army and federalized Mississippi National Guard forces to the campus to quell the riot. Meredith began classes the day after the troops arrived.

Kennard and other activists continued to work on public university desegregation. In 1965 Raylawni Branch and Gwendolyn Elaine Armstrong became the first African-American students to attend the University of Southern Mississippi. By that time, McCain helped ensure they had a peaceful entry. In 2006, Judge Robert Helfrich ruled that Kennard was factually innocent of all charges for which he had been convicted in the 1950s.

=== Albany Movement (1961–1962) ===
The SCLC, which had been criticized by some student activists for its failure to participate more fully in the freedom rides, committed much of its prestige and resources to a desegregation campaign in Albany, Georgia, in November 1961. King, who had been criticized personally by some SNCC activists for his distance from the dangers that local organizers faced—and given the derisive nickname "De Lawd" as a result—intervened personally to assist the campaign led by both SNCC organizers and local leaders.

The campaign was a failure because of the canny tactics of Laurie Pritchett, the local police chief, and divisions within the black community. The goals may not have been specific enough. Pritchett contained the marchers without violent attacks on demonstrators that inflamed national opinion. He also arranged for arrested demonstrators to be taken to jails in surrounding communities, allowing plenty of room to remain in his jail. Pritchett also foresaw King's presence as a danger and forced his release to avoid King's rallying the black community. King left in 1962 without having achieved any dramatic victories. The local movement, however, continued the struggle, and it obtained significant gains in the next few years.

=== Birmingham campaign (1963) ===
The Albany movement was shown to be an important education for the SCLC, however, when it undertook the Birmingham campaign in 1963. Executive Director Wyatt Tee Walker carefully planned the early strategy and tactics for the campaign. It focused on one goal—the desegregation of Birmingham's downtown merchants, rather than total desegregation, as in Albany.

The movement's efforts were helped by the brutal response of local authorities, in particular Eugene "Bull" Connor, the Commissioner of Public Safety. He had long held much political power but had lost a recent election for mayor to a less rabidly segregationist candidate. Refusing to accept the new mayor's authority, Connor intended to stay in office.

The campaign used a variety of nonviolent methods of confrontation, including sit-ins, kneel-ins at local churches, and a march to the county building to mark the beginning of a drive to register voters. The city, however, obtained an injunction barring all such protests. Convinced that the order was unconstitutional, the campaign defied it and prepared for mass arrests of its supporters. King elected to be among those arrested on April 12, 1963.

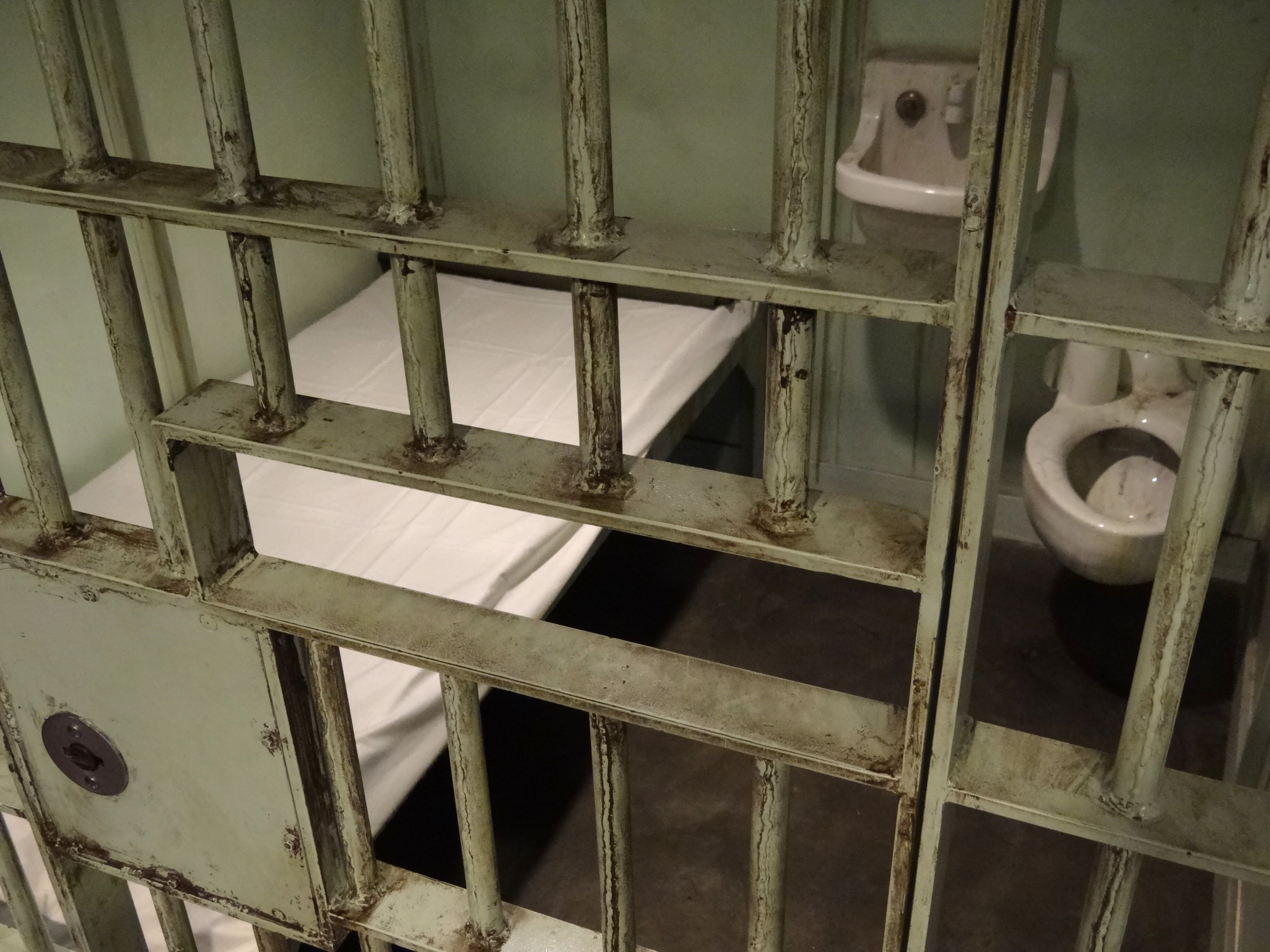
Recreation of Martin Luther King Jr.'s cell in Birmingham Jail at the National Civil Rights Museum

While in jail, King wrote his famous "Letter from Birmingham Jail" on the margins of a newspaper, since he had not been allowed any writing paper while held in solitary confinement. Supporters appealed to the Kennedy administration, which intervened to obtain King's release. Walter Reuther, president of the United Auto Workers, arranged for $160,000 to bail out King and his fellow protestors. King was allowed to call his wife, who was recuperating at home after the birth of their fourth child and was released early on April 19.

The campaign, however, faltered as it ran out of demonstrators willing to risk arrest. James Bevel, SCLC's Director of Direct Action and Director of Nonviolent Education, then came up with a bold and controversial alternative: to train high school students to take part in the demonstrations. As a result, in what would be called the Children's Crusade, more than one thousand students skipped school on May 2 to meet at the 16th Street Baptist Church to join the demonstrations. More than six hundred marched out of the church fifty at a time in an attempt to walk to City Hall to speak to Birmingham's mayor about segregation. They were arrested and put into jail. In this first encounter, the police acted with restraint. On the next day, however, another one thousand students gathered at the church. When Bevel started them marching fifty at a time, Bull Connor finally unleashed police dogs on them and then turned the city's fire hoses water streams on the children. National television networks broadcast the scenes of the dogs attacking demonstrators and the water from the fire hoses knocking down the schoolchildren.

Widespread public outrage led the Kennedy administration to intervene more forcefully in negotiations between the white business community and the SCLC. On May 10, the parties announced an agreement to desegregate the lunch counters and other public accommodations downtown, to create a committee to eliminate discriminatory hiring practices, to arrange for the release of jailed protesters, and to establish regular means of communication between black and white leaders.

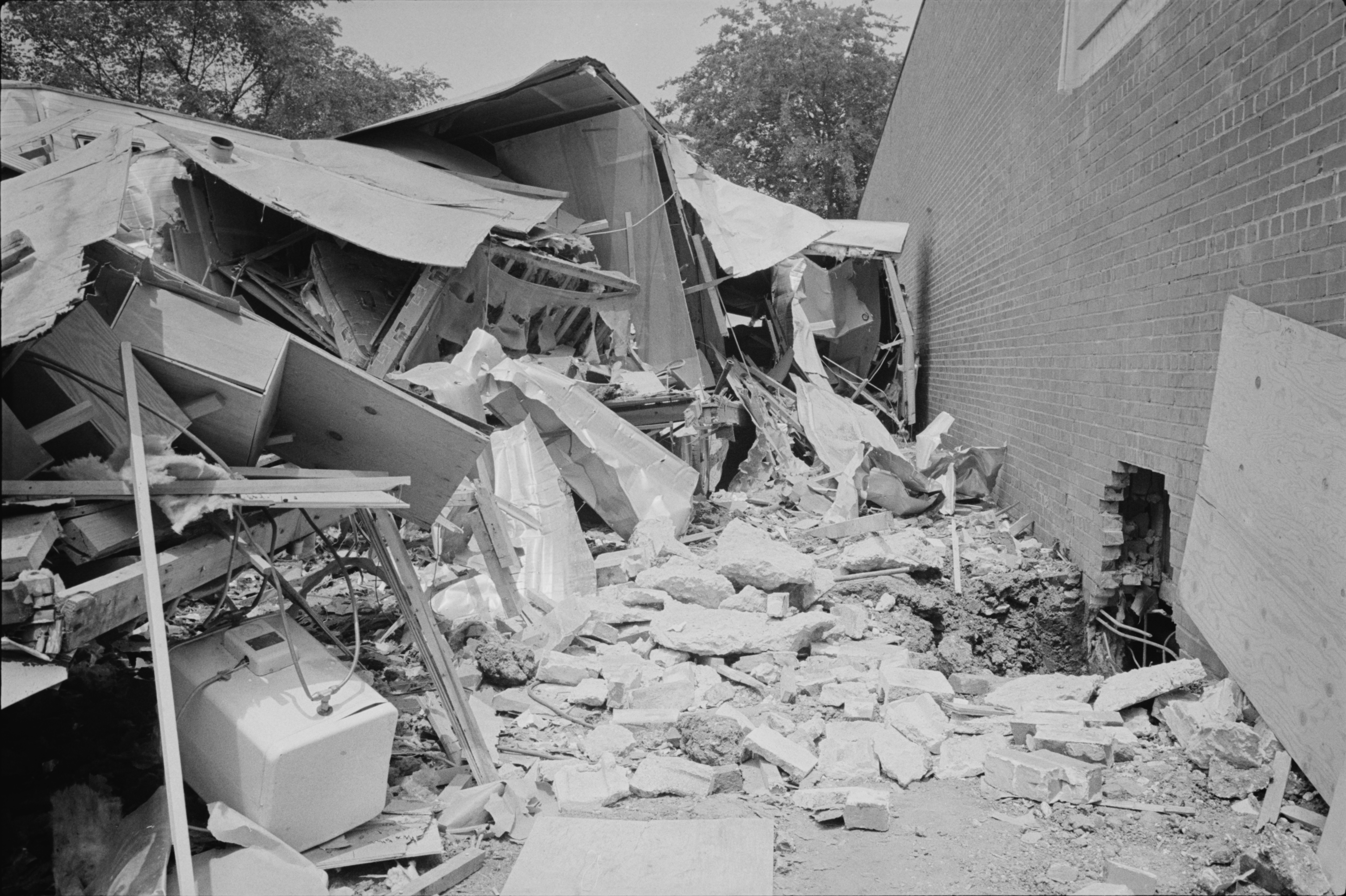
Wreckage at the Gaston Motel following the bomb explosion on May 11, 1963

Not everyone in the black community approved of the agreement—Fred Shuttlesworth was particularly critical, since he was skeptical about the good faith of Birmingham's power structure from his experience in dealing with them. Parts of the white community reacted violently. They bombed the Gaston Motel, which housed the SCLC's unofficial headquarters, and the home of King's brother, the Reverend A. D. King. In response, thousands of blacks rioted, burning numerous buildings and one of them stabbed and wounded a police officer.

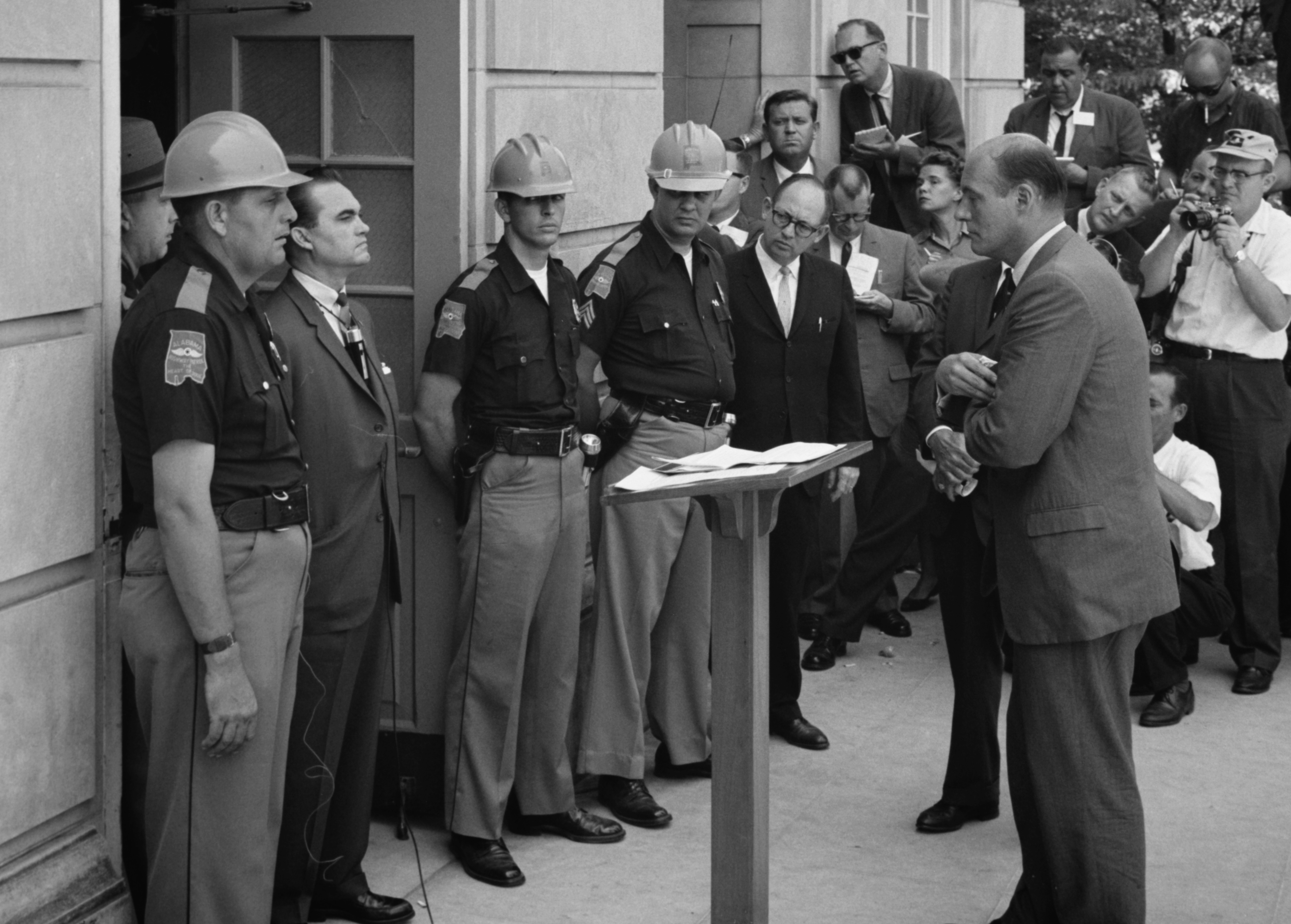
Alabama governor George Wallace tried to block desegregation at the University of Alabama and is confronted by U.S. Deputy Attorney General Nicholas Katzenbach in 1963.

Kennedy prepared to federalize the Alabama National Guard if the need arose. Four months later, on September 15, a conspiracy of Ku Klux Klan members bombed the Sixteenth Street Baptist Church in Birmingham, killing four young girls.

=== "Rising tide of discontent" and Kennedy's response (1963) ===
Birmingham was only one of over a hundred cities rocked by the chaotic protest that spring and summer, some of them in the North but mainly in the South. During the March on Washington, Martin Luther King Jr. would refer to such protests as "the whirlwinds of revolt." In Chicago, blacks rioted through the South Side in late May after a white police officer shot a fourteen-year-old black boy who was fleeing the scene of a robbery. Violent clashes between black activists and white workers took place in both Philadelphia and Harlem in successful efforts to integrate state construction projects. On June 6, over a thousand whites attacked a sit-in in Lexington, North Carolina; blacks fought back and one white man was killed. Edwin C. Berry of the National Urban League warned of a complete breakdown in race relations: "My message from the beer gardens and the barbershops all indicate the fact that the Negro is ready for war."

In Cambridge, Maryland, a working‐class city on the Eastern Shore, Gloria Richardson of SNCC led a movement that pressed for desegregation but also demanded low‐rent public housing, job‐training, public and private jobs, and an end to police brutality. On June 11, struggles between blacks and whites escalated into violent rioting, leading Maryland Governor J. Millard Tawes to declare martial law. When negotiations between Richardson and Maryland officials faltered, Attorney General Robert F. Kennedy directly intervened to negotiate a desegregation agreement. Richardson felt that the increasing participation of poor and working-class blacks was expanding both the power and parameters of the movement, asserting that "the people as a whole really do have more intelligence than a few of their leaders.ʺ

In their deliberations during this wave of protests, the Kennedy administration privately felt that militant demonstrations were ʺbad for the countryʺ and that "Negroes are going to push this thing too far." On May 24, Robert Kennedy had a meeting with prominent black intellectuals to discuss the racial situation. The black delegation criticized Kennedy harshly for vacillating on civil rights and said that the African-American community's thoughts were increasingly turning to violence. The meeting ended with ill will on all sides. Nonetheless, the Kennedys ultimately decided that new legislation for equal public accommodations was essential to drive activists "into the courts and out of the streets."

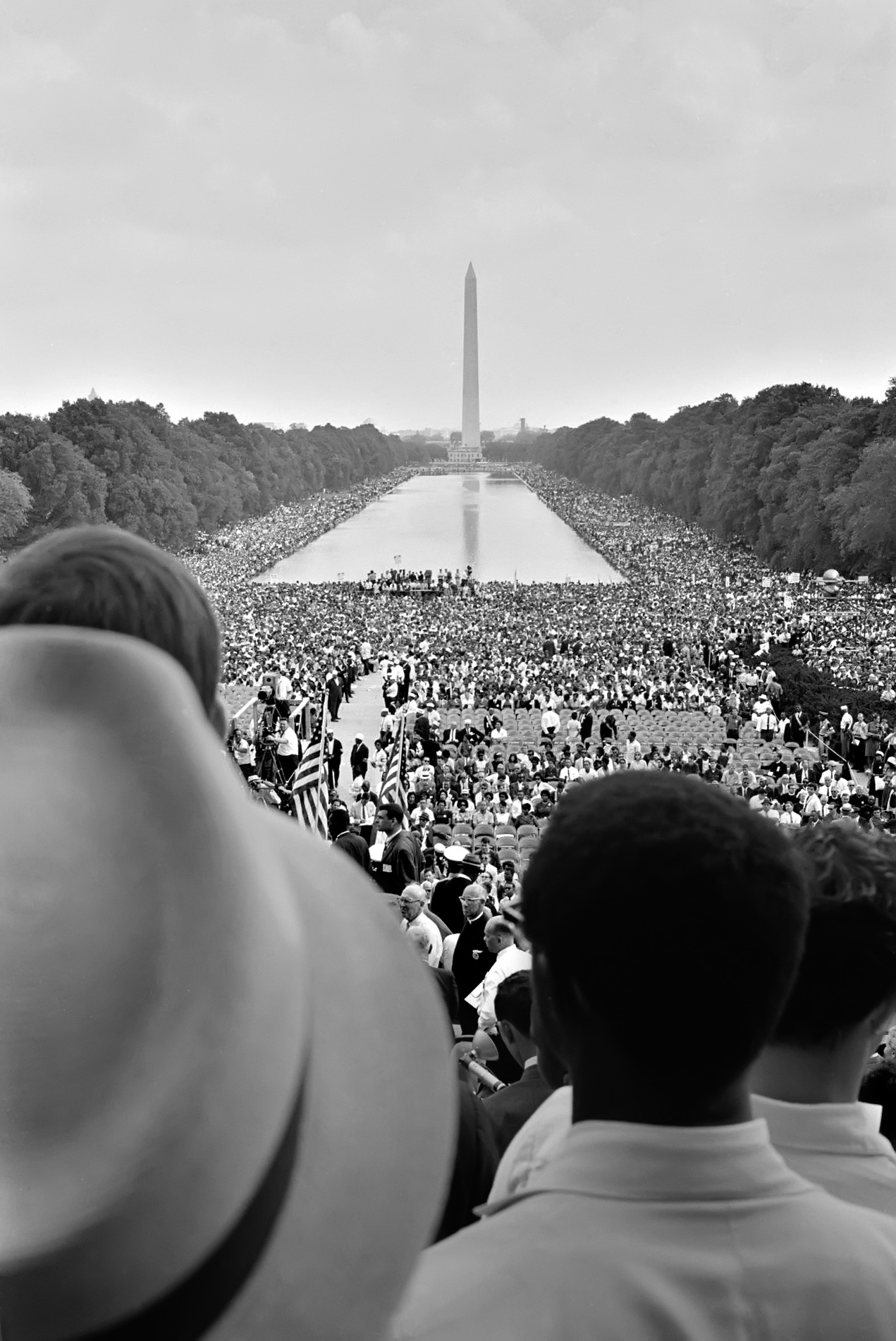
The March on Washington for Jobs and Freedom at the National Mall

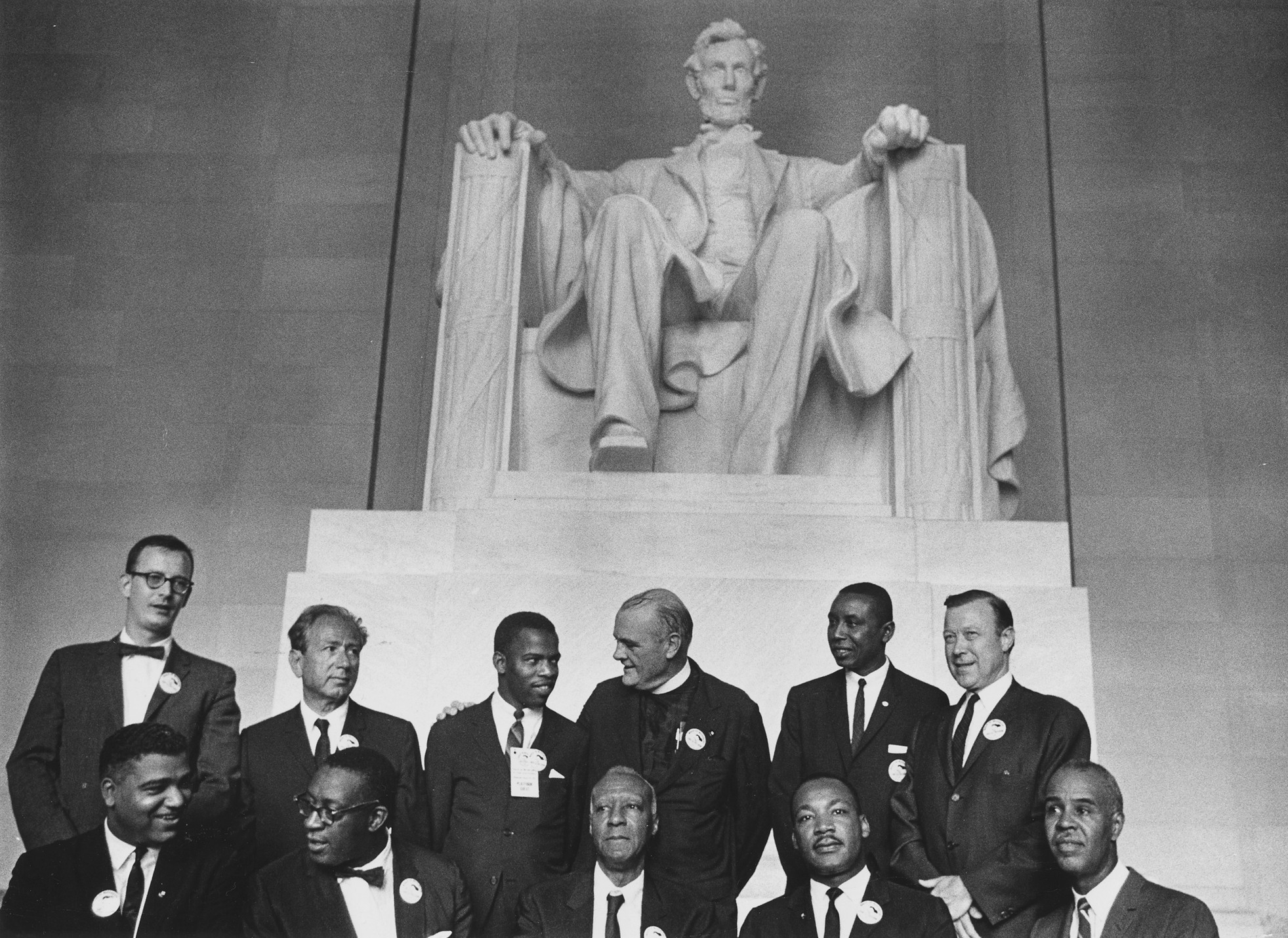
Leaders of the March on Washington posing before the Lincoln Memorial on August 28, 1963

On June 11, 1963, George Wallace, Governor of Alabama, tried to block the integration of the University of Alabama. President John F. Kennedy sent a military force to make Governor Wallace step aside, allowing the enrollment of Vivian Malone Jones and James Hood. That evening, President Kennedy addressed the nation on TV and radio with his historic civil rights speech, where he lamented "a rising tide of discontent that threatens the public safety." He called on Congress to pass new civil rights legislation, and urged the country to embrace civil rights as "a moral issue...in our daily lives." In the early hours of June 12, Medgar Evers, field secretary of the Mississippi NAACP, was assassinated by a member of the Klan. The next week, as promised, on June 19, 1963, President Kennedy submitted his Civil Rights bill to Congress.

=== March on Washington (1963) ===
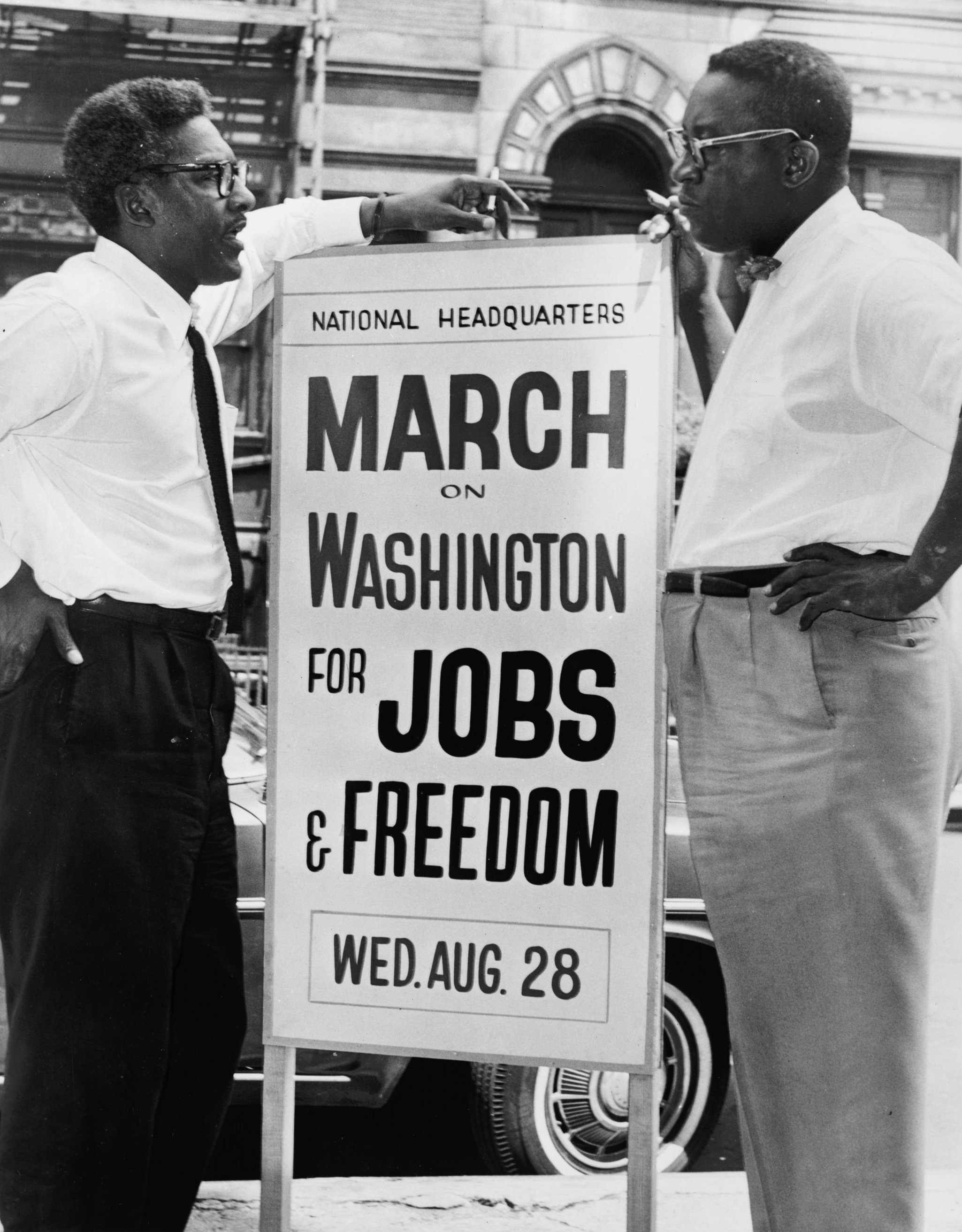
Bayard Rustin (left) and Cleveland Robinson (right), organizers of the March, on August 7, 1963

Randolph and Bayard Rustin were the chief planners of the March on Washington for Jobs and Freedom, which they proposed in 1962. In 1963, the Kennedy administration initially opposed the march out of concern it would negatively impact the drive for passage of civil rights legislation. However, Randolph and King were firm that the march would proceed. With the march going forward, the Kennedys decided it was important to work to ensure its success. Concerned about the turnout, President Kennedy enlisted the aid of white church leaders and Walter Reuther, president of the UAW, to help mobilize white supporters for the march.

The march was held on August 28, 1963. Unlike the planned 1941 march, for which Randolph included only black-led organizations in the planning, the 1963 march was a collaborative effort of all of the major civil rights organizations, the more progressive wing of the labor movement, and other liberal organizations. The march had six official goals:

- meaningful civil rights laws
- a massive federal works program
- full and fair employment
- decent housing
- the right to vote
- adequate integrated education.

Of these, the march's major focus was on passage of the civil rights law that the Kennedy administration had proposed after the upheavals in Birmingham.

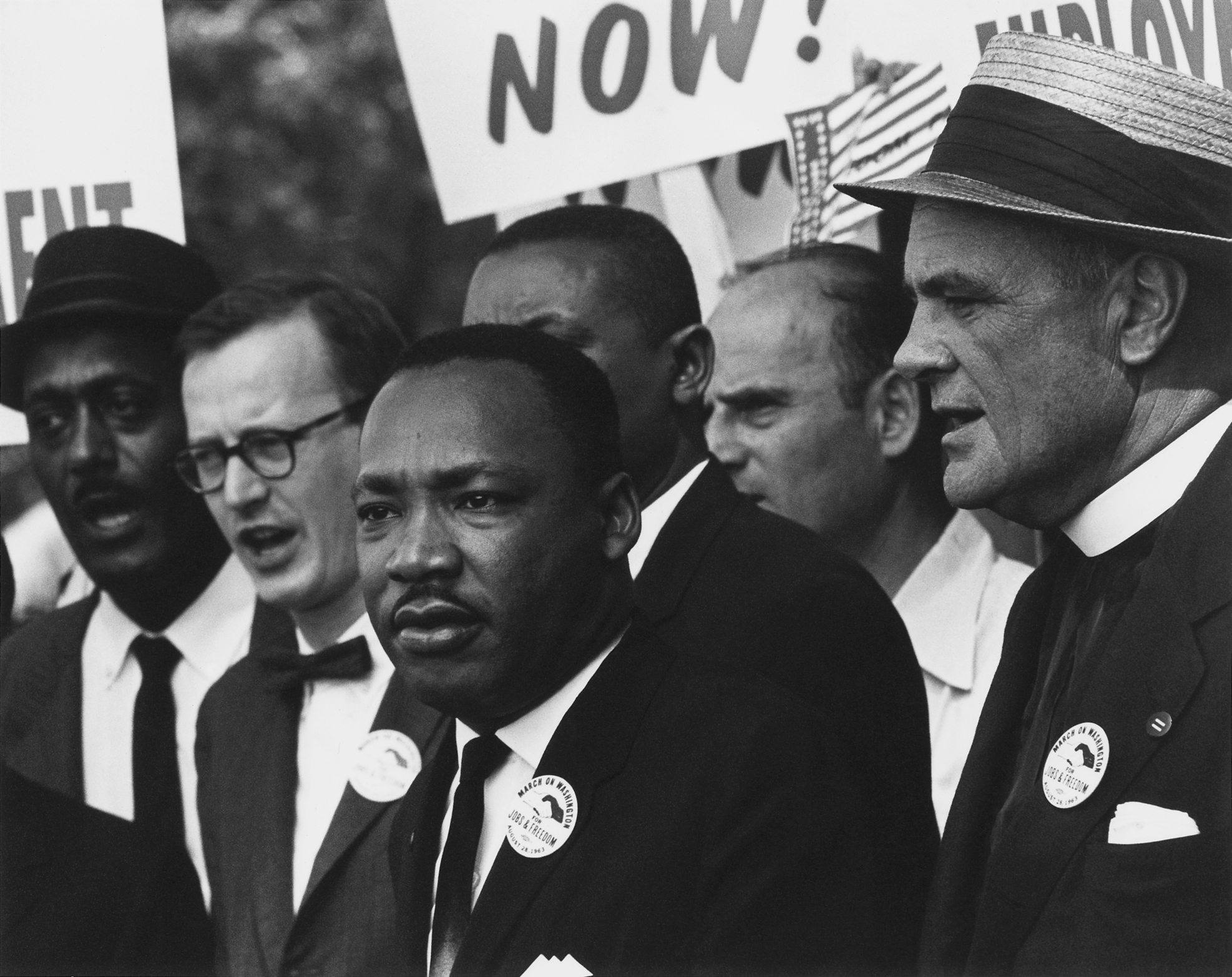
Martin Luther King Jr. at a civil rights march on Washington, D.C.

National media attention also greatly contributed to the march's national exposure and probable impact. In the essay "The March on Washington and Television News", historian William Thomas notes: "Over five hundred cameramen, technicians, and correspondents from the major networks were set to cover the event. More cameras would be set up than had filmed the last presidential inauguration. One camera was positioned high in the Washington Monument, to give dramatic vistas of the marchers". By carrying the organizers' speeches and offering their own commentary, television stations framed the way their local audiences saw and understood the event.

The march was a success, although not without controversy. An estimated 200,000 to 300,000 demonstrators gathered in front of the Lincoln Memorial, where King delivered his famous "I Have a Dream" speech. While many speakers applauded the Kennedy administration for the efforts it had made toward obtaining new, more effective civil rights legislation protecting the right to vote and outlawing segregation, John Lewis of SNCC took the administration to task for not doing more to protect southern blacks and civil rights workers under attack in the Deep South.

After the march, King and other civil rights leaders met with President Kennedy at the White House. While the Kennedy administration appeared sincerely committed to passing the bill, it was not clear that it had enough votes in Congress to do so. However, when President Kennedy was assassinated on November 22, 1963, the new President Lyndon Johnson decided to use his influence in Congress to bring about much of Kennedy's legislative agenda.

=== St. Augustine, Florida (1963–1964) ===
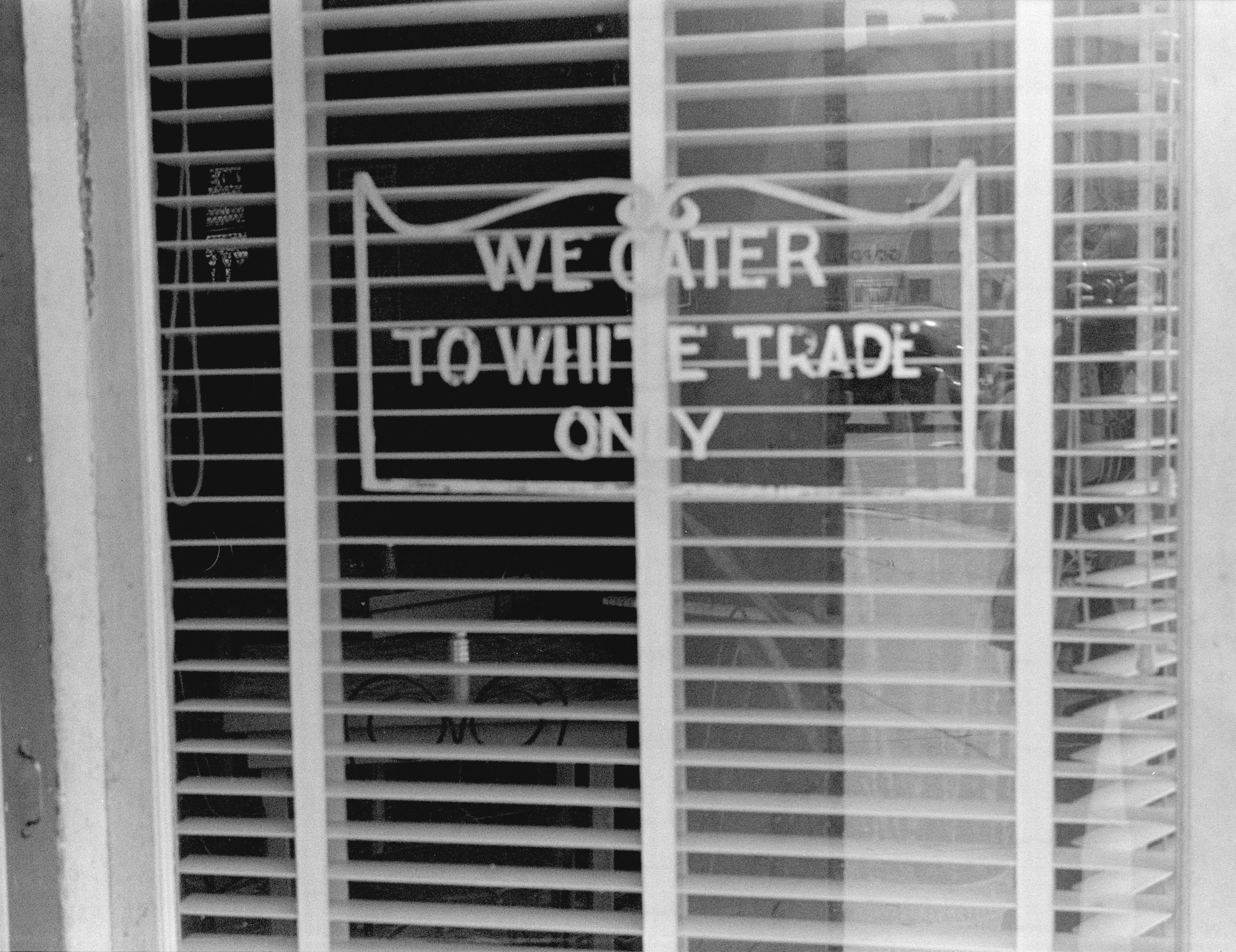
"We Cater to White Trade Only" sign on a restaurant window in Lancaster, Ohio, in 1938. In 1964, Martin Luther King Jr. was arrested and spent a night in jail for attempting to eat at a white-only restaurant in St. Augustine, Florida.

St. Augustine was famous as the "Nation's Oldest City", founded by the Spanish in 1565. It became the stage for a great drama leading up to the passage of the landmark Civil Rights Act of 1964. A local movement, led by Robert B. Hayling, a black dentist and Air Force veteran affiliated with the NAACP, had been picketing segregated local institutions since 1963. In the fall of 1964, Hayling and three companions were brutally beaten at a Ku Klux Klan rally.

Nightriders shot into black homes, and teenagers Audrey Nell Edwards, JoeAnn Anderson, Samuel White, and Willie Carl Singleton (who came to be known as "The St. Augustine Four") sat in at a local Woolworth's lunch counter, seeking to get served. They were arrested and convicted of trespassing, and sentenced to six months in jail and reform school. It took a special act of the governor and cabinet of Florida to release them after national protests by the Pittsburgh Courier, Jackie Robinson, and others.

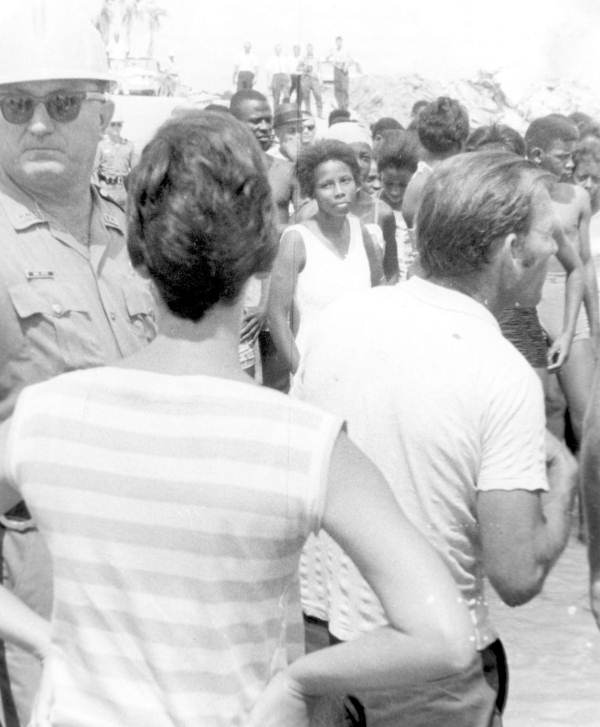
White segregationists (foreground) trying to prevent black people from swimming at a "White only" beach in St. Augustine, Florida during the 1964 Monson Motor Lodge protests

In response to the repression, the St. Augustine movement practiced armed self-defense in addition to nonviolent direct action. In June 1963, Hayling publicly stated that "I and the others have armed. We will shoot first and answer questions later. We are not going to die like Medgar Evers." The comment made national headlines. When Klan nightriders terrorized black neighborhoods in St. Augustine, Hayling's NAACP members often drove them off with gunfire. In October 1963, a Klansman was killed.

In 1964, Hayling and other activists urged the Southern Christian Leadership Conference to come to St. Augustine. Four prominent Massachusetts women—Mary Parkman Peabody, Esther Burgess, Hester Campbell (all of whose husbands were Episcopal bishops), and Florence Rowe (whose husband was vice president of an insurance company)—also came to lend their support. The arrest of Peabody, the 72-year-old mother of the governor of Massachusetts, for attempting to eat at the segregated Ponce de Leon Motor Lodge in an integrated group, made front-page news across the country and brought the movement in St. Augustine to the attention of the world.

Widely publicized activities continued in the ensuing months. When King was arrested, he sent a "Letter from the St. Augustine Jail" to a northern supporter, Rabbi Israel S. Dresner. A week later, in the largest mass arrest of rabbis in American history took place, while they were conducting a pray-in at the segregated Monson Motel. A well-known photograph taken in St. Augustine shows the manager of the Monson Motel pouring hydrochloric acid in the swimming pool while blacks and whites are swimming in it. As he did so he yelled that he was "cleaning the pool", a presumed reference to it now being, in his eyes, racially contaminated. The photograph was run on the front page of a Washington newspaper the day the Senate was to vote on passing the Civil Rights Act of 1964.

=== Chester school protests (Spring 1964) ===
From November 1963 through April 1964, the Chester school protests were a series of civil rights protests led by George Raymond of the National Association for the Advancement of Colored Persons (NAACP) and Stanley Branche of the Committee for Freedom Now (CFFN) that made Chester, Pennsylvania one of the key battlegrounds of the civil rights movement. James Farmer, the national director of the Congress of Racial Equality called Chester "the Birmingham of the North".

In 1962, Branche and the CFFN focused on improving conditions at the predominantly black Franklin Elementary school in Chester. Although the school was built to house 500 students, it had become overcrowded with 1,200 students. The school's average class size was 39, twice the number of nearby all-white schools. The school was built in 1910 and had never been updated. Only two bathrooms were available for the entire school. In November 1963, CFFN protesters blocked the entrance to Franklin Elementary school and the Chester Municipal Building resulting in the arrest of 240 protesters. Following public attention to the protests stoked by media coverage of the mass arrests, the mayor and school board negotiated with the CFFN and NAACP. The Chester Board of Education agreed to reduce class sizes at Franklin school, remove unsanitary toilet facilities, relocate classes held in the boiler room and coal bin and repair school grounds.

Emboldened by the success of the Franklin Elementary school demonstrations, the CFFN recruited new members, sponsored voter registration drives and planned a citywide boycott of Chester schools. Branche built close ties with students at nearby Swarthmore College, Pennsylvania Military College and Cheyney State College in order to ensure large turnouts at demonstrations and protests. Branche invited Dick Gregory and Malcolm X to Chester to participate in the "Freedom Now Conference" and other national civil rights leaders such as Gloria Richardson came to Chester in support of the demonstrations.

In 1964, a series of almost nightly protests brought chaos to Chester as protestors argued that the Chester School Board had de facto segregation of schools. The mayor of Chester, James Gorbey, issued "The Police Position to Preserve the Public Peace", a ten-point statement promising an immediate return to law and order. The city deputized firemen and trash collectors to help handle demonstrators. The State of Pennsylvania deployed 50 state troopers to assist the 77-member Chester police force. The demonstrations were marked by violence and charges of police brutality. Over six hundred people were arrested over a two-month period of civil rights rallies, marches, pickets, boycotts and sit-ins. Pennsylvania Governor William Scranton became involved in the negotiations and convinced Branche to obey a court-ordered moratorium on demonstrations. Scranton created the Pennsylvania Human Relations Commission to conduct hearings on the de facto segregation of public schools. All protests were discontinued while the commission held hearings during the summer of 1964.

In November 1964, the Pennsylvania Human Relations Commission concluded that the Chester School Board had violated the law and ordered the Chester School District to desegregate the city's six predominantly African-American schools. The city appealed the ruling, which delayed implementation.

=== Freedom Summer (1964) ===
In the summer of 1964, COFO brought nearly 1,000 activists to Mississippi—most of them white college students from the North and West—to join with local black activists to register voters, teach in "Freedom Schools", and organize the Mississippi Freedom Democratic Party (MFDP).

Many of Mississippi's white residents deeply resented the outsiders and attempts to change their society. State and local governments, police, the White Citizens' Council and the Ku Klux Klan used arrests, beatings, arson, murder, spying, firing, evictions, and other forms of intimidation and harassment to oppose the project and prevent blacks from registering to vote or achieving social equality.

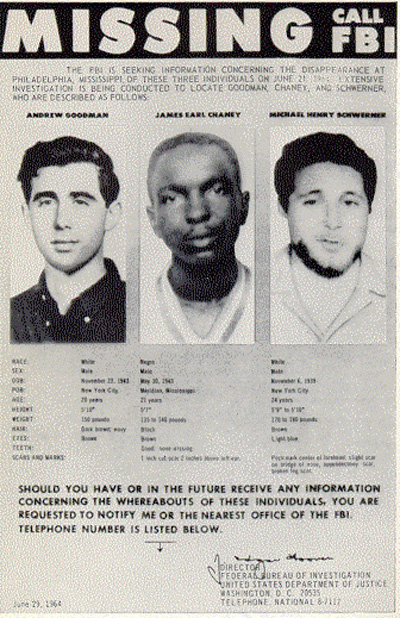
Missing persons poster created by the FBI in 1964 shows the photographs of Andrew Goodman, James Chaney, and Michael Schwerner

On June 21, 1964, three civil rights workers disappeared: James Chaney, a young black Mississippian and plasterer's apprentice; and two Jewish activists, Andrew Goodman, a Queens College anthropology student; and Michael Schwerner, a CORE organizer from Manhattan's Lower East Side. They were found weeks later, murdered by conspirators who turned out to be local members of the Klan, some of the members of the Neshoba County sheriff's department. This outraged the public, leading the U.S. Justice Department along with the FBI (the latter which had previously avoided dealing with the issue of segregation and persecution of blacks) to take action. The outrage over these murders helped lead to the passage of the Civil Rights Act of 1964 and the Voting Rights Act of 1965.

From June to August, Freedom Summer activists worked in 38 local projects scattered across the state, with the largest number concentrated in the Mississippi Delta region. At least 30 Freedom Schools, with close to 3,500 students, were established, and 28 community centers were set up.

Over the course of the Summer Project, some 17,000 Mississippi blacks attempted to become registered voters in defiance of the red tape and forces of white supremacy arrayed against them—only 1,600 (less than 10%) succeeded. But more than 80,000 joined the Mississippi Freedom Democratic Party (MFDP), founded as an alternative political organization, showing their desire to vote and participate in politics.

Though Freedom Summer failed to register many voters, it had a significant effect on the course of the civil rights movement. It helped break down the decades of people's isolation and repression that were the foundation of the Jim Crow system. Before Freedom Summer, the national news media had paid little attention to the persecution of black voters in the Deep South and the dangers endured by black civil rights workers. The progression of events throughout the South increased media attention to Mississippi.

The deaths of affluent northern white students and threats to non-Southerners attracted the full attention of the media spotlight to the state. Many black activists became embittered, believing the media valued the lives of whites and blacks differently. Perhaps the most significant effect of Freedom Summer was on the volunteers, almost all of whom—black and white—still consider it to have been one of the defining periods of their lives.

=== Civil Rights Act of 1964 ===
Although President Kennedy had proposed civil rights legislation and it had support from Northern Congressmen and Senators of both parties, Southern Senators blocked the bill by threatening filibusters. After considerable parliamentary maneuvering and 54 days of filibuster on the floor of the United States Senate, President Johnson got a bill through the Congress.

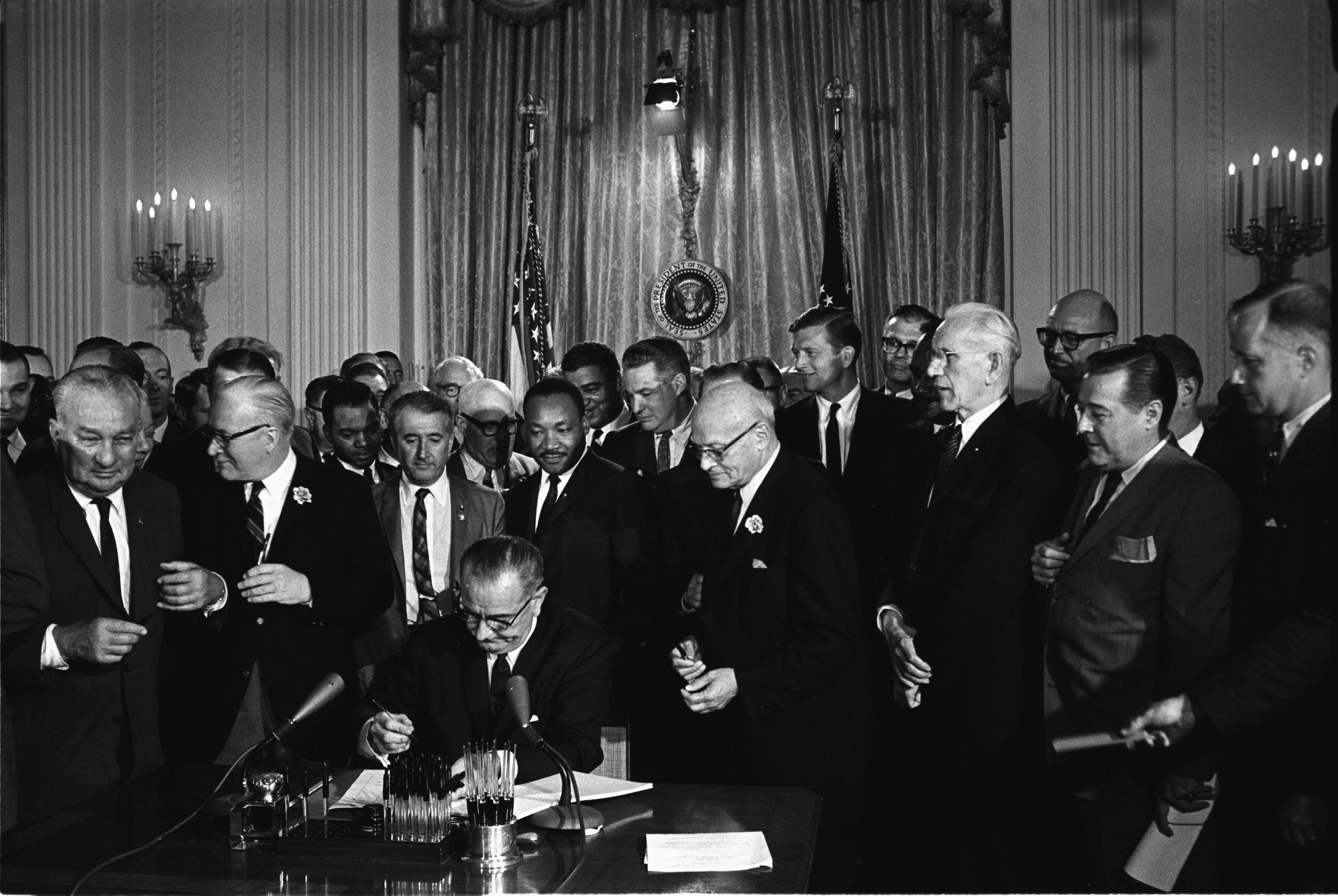
Lyndon B. Johnson signs the historic Civil Rights Act of 1964

On July 2, 1964, Johnson signed the Civil Rights Act of 1964, which banned discrimination based on "race, color, religion, sex or national origin" in employment practices and public accommodations. The bill authorized the Attorney General to file lawsuits to enforce the new law. The law also nullified state and local laws that required such discrimination.

=== Mississippi Freedom Democratic Party (1964) ===
Blacks in Mississippi had been disfranchised by statutory and constitutional changes since the late 19th century. In 1963 COFO held a Freedom Ballot in Mississippi to demonstrate the desire of black Mississippians to vote. More than 80,000 people registered and voted in the mock election, which pitted an integrated slate of candidates from the "Freedom Party" against the official state Democratic Party candidates.

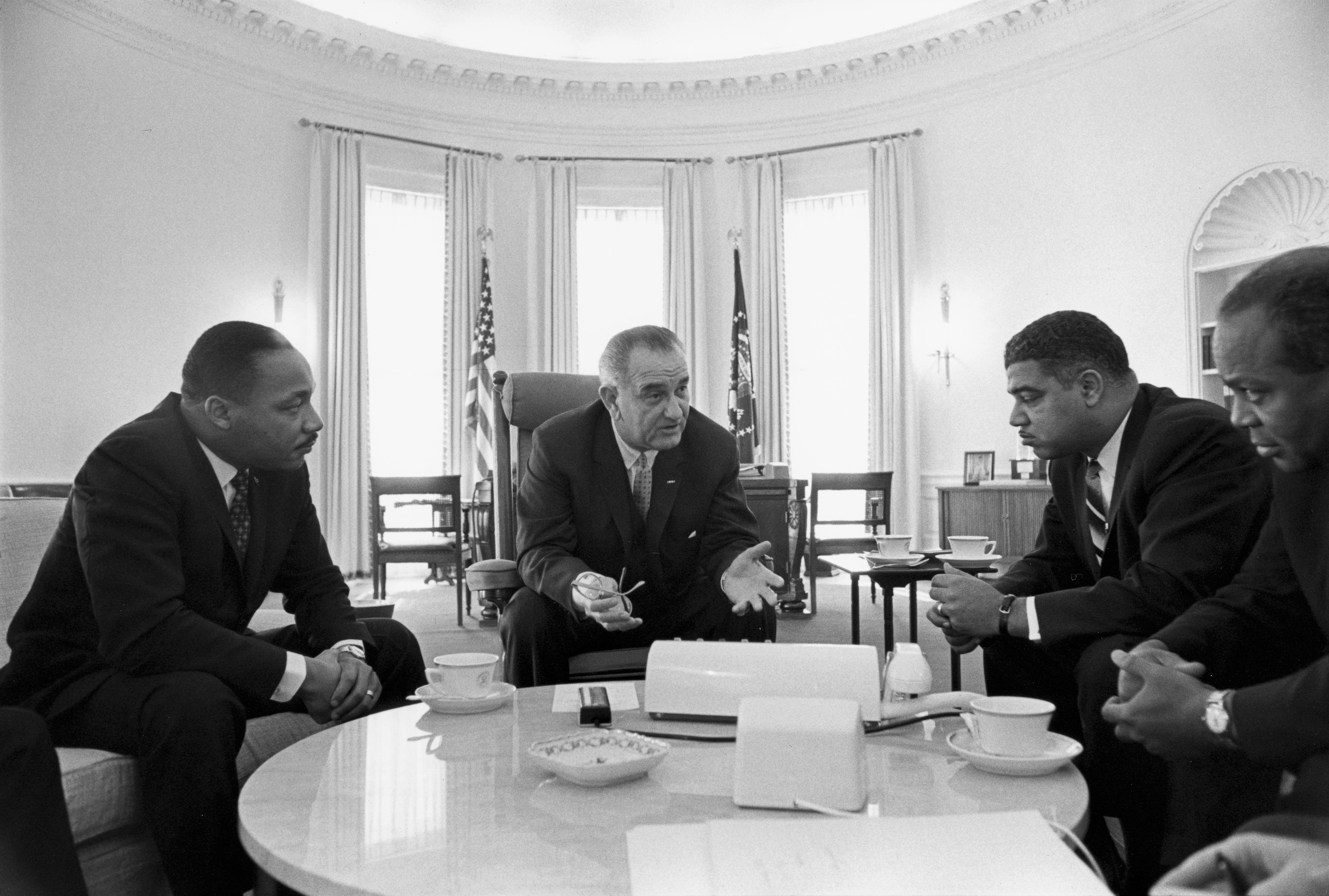
President Lyndon B. Johnson (center) meets with civil rights leaders Martin Luther King Jr., Whitney Young, and James Farmer, January 1964

In 1964, organizers launched the Mississippi Freedom Democratic Party (MFDP) to challenge the all-white official party. When Mississippi voting registrars refused to recognize their candidates, they held their own primary. They selected Fannie Lou Hamer, Annie Devine, and Victoria Gray to run for Congress, and a slate of delegates to represent Mississippi at the 1964 Democratic National Convention.

The presence of the Mississippi Freedom Democratic Party in Atlantic City, New Jersey, was inconvenient, however, for the convention organizers. They had planned a triumphant celebration of the Johnson administration's achievements in civil rights, rather than a fight over racism within the Democratic Party. All-white delegations from other Southern states threatened to walk out if the official slate from Mississippi was not seated. Johnson was worried about the inroads that Republican Barry Goldwater's campaign was making in what previously had been the white Democratic stronghold of the "Solid South", as well as support that George Wallace had received in the North during the Democratic primaries.

Johnson could not, however, prevent the MFDP from taking its case to the Credentials Committee. There Fannie Lou Hamer testified eloquently about the beatings that she and others endured and the threats they faced for trying to register to vote. Turning to the television cameras, Hamer asked, "Is this America?"

Johnson offered the MFDP a "compromise" under which it would receive two non-voting, at-large seats, while the white delegation sent by the official Democratic Party would retain its seats. The MFDP angrily rejected the "compromise."

The MFDP kept up its agitation at the convention after it was denied official recognition. When all but three of the "regular" Mississippi delegates left because they refused to pledge allegiance to the party, the MFDP delegates borrowed passes from sympathetic delegates and took the seats vacated by the official Mississippi delegates. National party organizers removed them. When they returned the next day, they found convention organizers had removed the empty seats that had been there the day before. They stayed and sang "freedom songs".

The 1964 Democratic Party convention disillusioned many within the MFDP and the civil rights movement, but it did not destroy the MFDP. The MFDP became more radical after Atlantic City. It invited Malcolm X to speak at one of its conventions and opposed the war in Vietnam.

=== Selma Voting Rights Movement ===
SNCC had undertaken an ambitious voter registration program in Selma, Alabama, in 1963, but by 1965 little headway had been made in the face of opposition from Selma's sheriff, Jim Clark. After local residents asked the SCLC for assistance, King came to Selma to lead several marches, at which he was arrested along with 250 other demonstrators. The marchers continued to meet violent resistance from the police. Jimmie Lee Jackson, a resident of nearby Marion, was killed by police at a later march on February 17, 1965. Jackson's death prompted James Bevel, director of the Selma Movement, to initiate and organize a plan to march from Selma to Montgomery, the state capital.

On March 7, 1965, acting on Bevel's plan, Hosea Williams of the SCLC and John Lewis of SNCC led a march of 600 people to walk the 54 miles (87 km) from Selma to the state capital in Montgomery. Six blocks into the march, at the Edmund Pettus Bridge where the marchers left the city and moved into the county, state troopers, and local county law enforcement, some mounted on horseback, attacked the peaceful demonstrators with billy clubs, tear gas, rubber tubes wrapped in barbed wire, and bullwhips. They drove the marchers back into Selma. Lewis was knocked unconscious and dragged to safety. At least 16 other marchers were hospitalized. Among those gassed and beaten was Amelia Boynton Robinson, who was at the center of civil rights activity at the time.

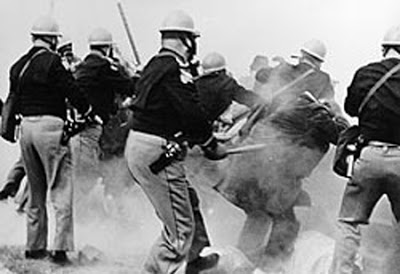
Police attack non-violent marchers on "Bloody Sunday", the first day of the Selma to Montgomery marches.

The national broadcast of the news footage of lawmen attacking unresisting marchers seeking to exercise their constitutional right to vote provoked a national response and hundreds of people from all over the country came for a second march. These marchers were turned around by King at the last minute so as not to violate a federal injunction. This displeased many demonstrators, especially those who resented King's nonviolence (such as James Forman and Robert F. Williams).

That night, local Whites attacked James Reeb, a voting rights supporter. He died of his injuries in a Birmingham hospital on March 11. Due to the national outcry at a White minister being murdered so brazenly (as well as the subsequent civil disobedience led by Gorman and other SNCC leaders all over the country, especially in Montgomery and at the White House), the marchers were able to lift the injunction and obtain protection from federal troops, permitting them to make the march across Alabama without incident two weeks later; during the march, Gorman, Williams, and other more militant protesters carried bricks and sticks of their own.

Four Klansmen shot and killed Detroit homemaker Viola Liuzzo as she drove marchers back to Selma that night.

=== Voting Rights Act of 1965 ===
'Remarks on the Signing of the Voting Rights Act'
Statement before the United States Congress by Johnson on August 6, 1965, about the Voting Rights Act

"Remarks on the Signing of the Voting Rights Act"
audio only

Eight days after the first march, but before the final march, President Johnson delivered a televised address to support the voting rights bill he had sent to Congress. In it he stated:

Their cause must be our cause too. Because it is not just Negroes, but really it is all of us, who must overcome the crippling legacy of bigotry and injustice. And we shall overcome.

On May 26, the Senate passed S. 1564, the Voting Rights Act, by a vote of 77–19, with only Southern Senators opposing the bill. On July 9, the House of Representatives passed H.R. 6400, the House version of the bill, by a vote of 333–85. On August 3–4, the two houses of Congress reconciled the two bill, and on August 6, President Johnson signed the Voting Rights Act of 1965. The bill suspended literacy tests and other subjective voter registration tests. It authorized Federal supervision of voter registration in states and individual voting districts where such tests were being used and where African Americans were historically under-represented in voting rolls compared to the eligible population. African Americans who had been barred from registering to vote finally had an alternative to taking suits to local or state courts, which had seldom prosecuted their cases to success. If discrimination in voter registration occurred, the 1965 act authorized the Attorney General of the United States to send Federal examiners to replace local registrars.

Within months of the bill's passage, 250,000 new black voters had been registered, one-third of them by federal examiners. Within four years, voter registration in the South had more than doubled. In 1965, Mississippi had the highest black voter turnout at 74% and led the nation in the number of black public officials elected. In 1969, Tennessee had a 92% turnout among black voters; Arkansas, 78%; and Texas, 73%.

Several whites who had opposed the Voting Rights Act paid a quick price. In 1966 Sheriff Jim Clark of Selma, Alabama, infamous for using cattle prods against civil rights marchers, was up for reelection. Although he took off the notorious "Never" pin on his uniform, he was defeated. At the election, Clark lost as blacks voted to get him out of office.

Blacks' regaining the power to vote changed the political landscape of the South. When Congress passed the Voting Rights Act, only about 100 African Americans held elective office, all in northern states. By 1989, there were more than 7,200 African Americans in office, including more than 4,800 in the South. Nearly every county where populations were majority black in Alabama had a black sheriff. Southern blacks held top positions in city, county, and state governments.

Atlanta elected a black mayor in 1982, Andrew Young, as did Jackson, Mississippi in 1997, with Harvey Johnson Jr., and New Orleans in 1978, with Ernest Morial. Black politicians on the national level included Barbara Jordan, elected as a Representative from Texas in Congress in 1973, and President Jimmy Carter appointed Andrew Young as United States Ambassador to the United Nations. Julian Bond was elected to the Georgia State Legislature in 1965, although political reaction to his public opposition to the U.S. involvement in the Vietnam War prevented him from taking his seat until 1967. John Lewis was first elected in 1986 to represent Georgia's 5th congressional district in the United States House of Representatives, where he served from 1987 until his death in 2020. There were only two Black members of Congress from the states of the former Confederacy elected in 1980, and four elected in 1990, but this rose to 16 in 2000.

=== Fair housing movements (1966–1968) ===
The first major blow against housing segregation in the era, the Rumford Fair Housing Act, was passed in California in 1963. It was overturned by white California voters and real estate lobbyists the following year with Proposition 14, a move which helped precipitate the Watts riots. In 1966, the California Supreme Court invalidated Proposition 14 and reinstated the Rumford Fair Housing Act.

Working and organizing for fair housing laws became a major project of the movement over the next two years, with Martin Luther King Jr., James Bevel, and Al Raby leading the Chicago Freedom Movement around the issue in 1966. In the following year, Father James Groppi and the NAACP Youth Council also attracted national attention with a fair housing campaign in Milwaukee. Both movements faced violent resistance from white homeowners and legal opposition from conservative politicians.

The Fair Housing Bill was the most contentious civil rights legislation of the era. Senator Walter Mondale, who advocated for the bill, noted that over successive years, it was the most filibustered legislation in U.S. history. It was opposed by most Northern and Southern senators, as well as the National Association of Real Estate Boards. A proposed "Civil Rights Act of 1966" had collapsed completely because of its fair housing provision. Mondale commented that:

A lot of civil rights [legislation] was about making the South behave and taking the teeth from George Wallace, [but] this came right to the neighborhoods across the country. This was civil rights getting personal.

=== Nationwide riots of 1967 ===
Film on the riots created by the White House Naval Photographic Unit

In 1967 riots broke out in black neighborhoods in more than 100 U.S. cities, including Detroit, Newark, Cincinnati, Cleveland, and Washington, D.C. The largest of these was the 1967 Detroit riot.

In Detroit, a large black middle class had begun to develop among those African Americans who worked at unionized jobs in the automotive industry. These workers complained of persisting racist practices, limiting the jobs they could have and opportunities for promotion. The United Auto Workers channeled these complaints into bureaucratic and ineffective grievance procedures. Violent white mobs enforced the segregation of housing up through the 1960s. Blacks who were not upwardly mobile were living in substandard conditions, subject to the same problems as poor African Americans in Watts and Harlem.

When white Detroit Police Department (DPD) officers shut down an illegal bar and arrested a large group of patrons during the hot summer, furious black residents rioted. Rioters looted and destroyed property while snipers engaged in firefights from rooftops and windows, undermining the DPD's ability to curtail the disorder. In response, the Michigan Army National Guard and U.S. Army paratroopers were deployed to reinforce the DPD and protect Detroit Fire Department (DFD) firefighters from attacks while putting out fires. Residents reported that police officers and National Guardsmen shot at black civilians and suspects indiscriminately. After five days, 43 people had been killed, hundreds injured, and thousands left homeless; $40 million to $45 million worth of damage was caused.

State and local governments responded to the riot with a dramatic increase in minority hiring. In the aftermath of the turmoil, the Greater Detroit Board of Commerce also launched a campaign to find jobs for ten thousand "previously unemployable" persons, a preponderant number of whom were black. Governor George Romney immediately responded to the riot of 1967 with a special session of the Michigan legislature where he forwarded sweeping housing proposals that included not only fair housing, but "important relocation, tenants' rights and code enforcement legislation." Romney had supported such proposals in 1965 but abandoned them in the face of organized opposition. The laws passed both houses of the legislature. Historian Sidney Fine wrote that:

The Michigan Fair Housing Act, which took effect on November 15, 1968, was stronger than the federal fair housing law...It is probably more than a coincidence that the state that had experienced the most severe racial disorder of the 1960s also adopted one of the strongest state fair housing acts.

President Johnson created the National Advisory Commission on Civil Disorders in response to a nationwide wave of riots. The commission's final report called for major reforms in employment and public policy in black communities. It warned that the United States was moving toward separate white and black societies.

=== Memphis, Assassination of King, and Civil Rights Act of 1968 ===
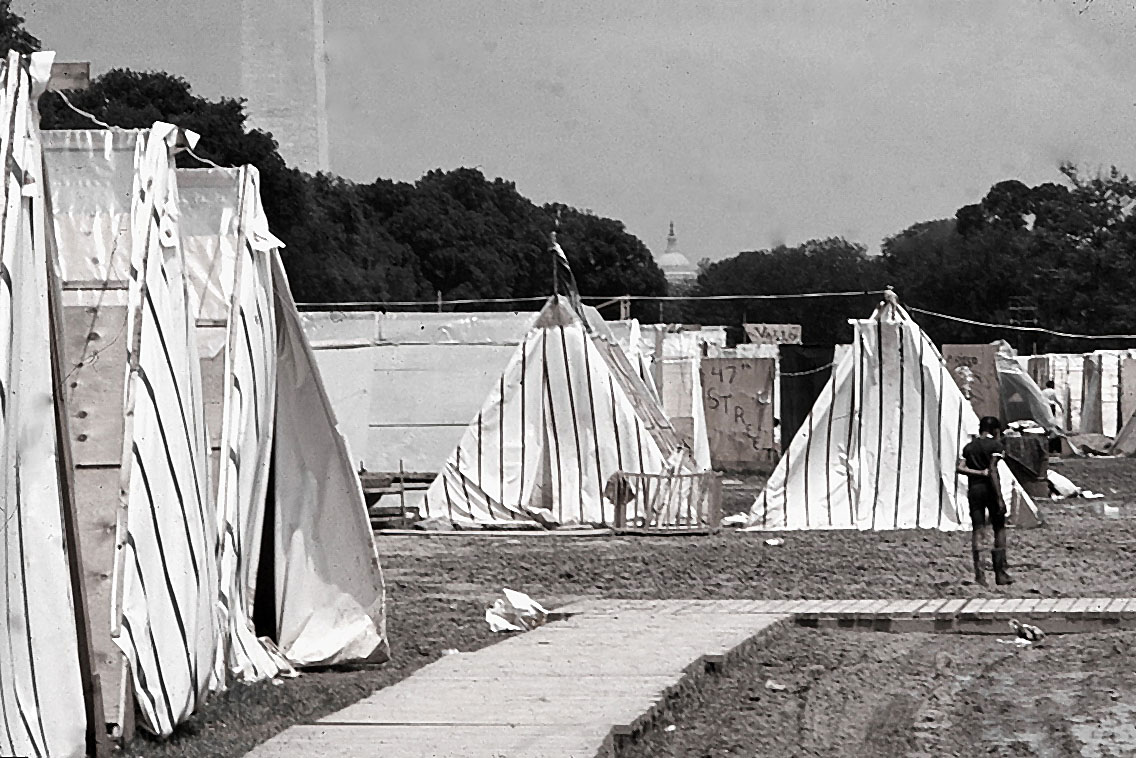
A 3,000-person shantytown called Resurrection City was established in 1968 on the National Mall as part of the Poor People's Campaign.

As 1968 began, the fair housing bill was being filibustered once again, but two developments revived it. The Kerner Commission report on the 1967 ghetto riots was delivered to Congress on March 1, and it strongly recommended "a comprehensive and enforceable federal open housing law" as a remedy to the civil disturbances. The Senate was moved to end their filibuster that week.

James Lawson invited King to Memphis, Tennessee, in March 1968 to support a sanitation workers' strike. These workers launched a campaign for union representation after two workers were accidentally killed on the job; they were seeking fair wages and improved working conditions. King considered their struggle to be a vital part of the Poor People's Campaign he was planning. A day after delivering his stirring "I've Been to the Mountaintop" sermon, which has become famous for his vision of American society, King was assassinated on April 4, 1968, at the Lorraine Motel in Memphis. Riots broke out in black neighborhoods in more than 110 cities across the United States in the days that followed, notably in Chicago, Baltimore, and Washington, D.C.

The day before King's funeral, April 8, a completely silent march with Coretta Scott King, SCLC, and UAW president Walter Reuther attracted approximately 42,000 participants. Armed National Guardsmen lined the streets, sitting on M-48 tanks, to protect the marchers, and helicopters circled overhead. On April 9, Mrs. King led another 150,000 people in a funeral procession through the streets of Atlanta. Her dignity revived courage and hope in many of the Movement's members, confirming her place as the new leader in the struggle for racial equality.

Coretta Scott King said,

Martin Luther King Jr. gave his life for the poor of the world, the garbage workers of Memphis and the peasants of Vietnam. The day that Negro people and others in bondage are truly free, on the day want is abolished, on the day wars are no more, on that day I know my husband will rest in a long-deserved peace.

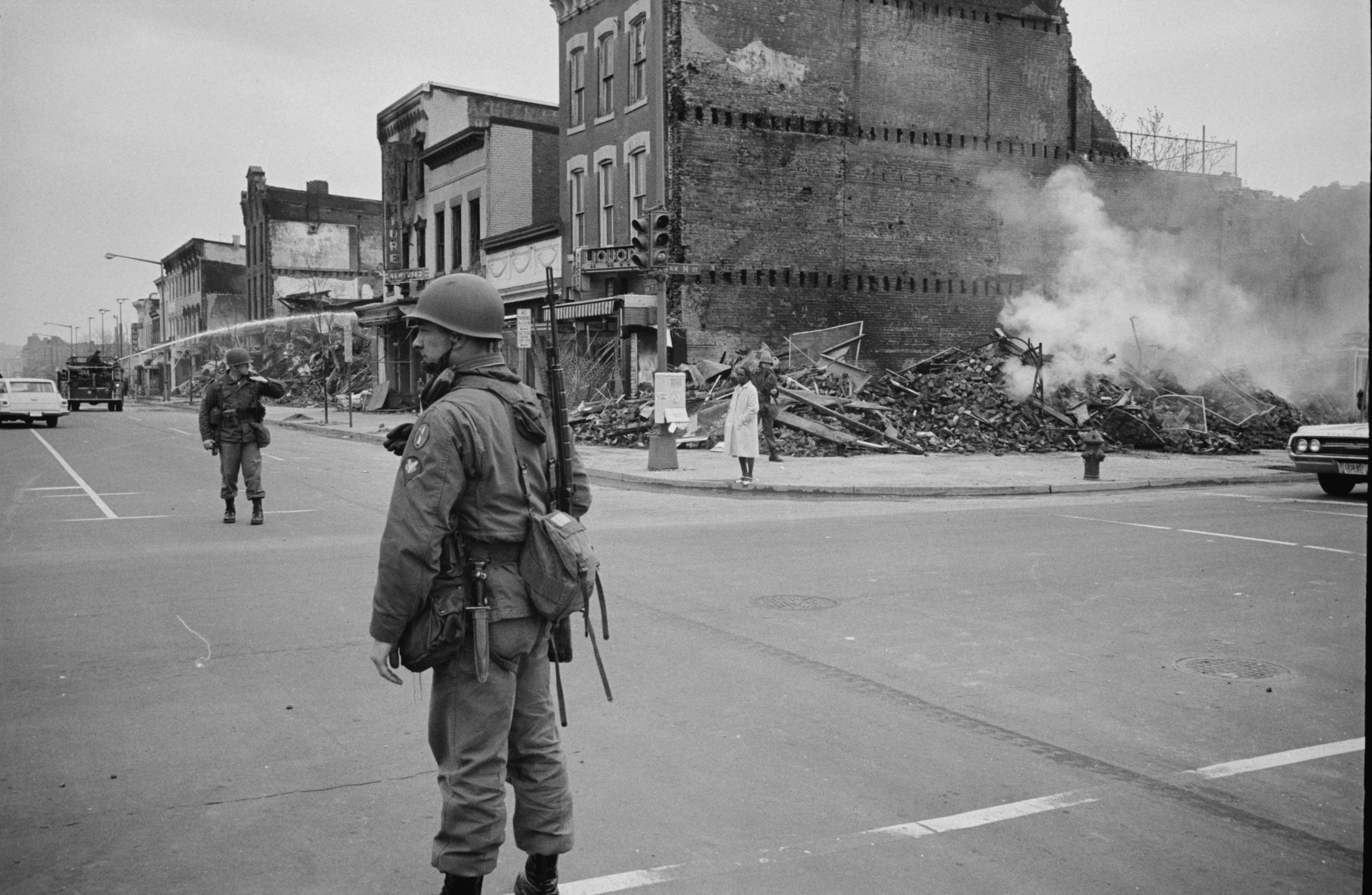
Aftermath of the King assassination riots in Washington, D.C.

Ralph Abernathy succeeded King as the head of the SCLC and attempted to carry forth King's plan for a Poor People's March. It was to unite blacks and whites to campaign for fundamental changes in American society and economic structure. The march went forward under Abernathy's plainspoken leadership but did not achieve its goals.

==== Civil Rights Act of 1968 ====
The U.S. House of Representatives had been deliberating its Fair Housing Act in early April, before King's assassination and the aforementioned wave of unrest that followed, the largest since the Civil War. Senator Charles Mathias wrote:

[S]ome Senators and Representatives publicly stated they would not be intimidated or rushed into legislating because of the disturbances. Nevertheless, the news coverage of the riots and the underlying disparities in income, jobs, housing, and education, between White and Black Americans helped educate citizens and Congress about the stark reality of an enormous social problem. Members of Congress knew they had to act to redress these imbalances in American life to fulfill the dream that King had so eloquently preached.

The House passed the legislation on April 10, less than a week after King was murdered, and President Johnson signed it the next day. The Civil Rights Act of 1968 prohibited discrimination concerning the sale, rental, and financing of housing based on race, religion, and national origin. It also made it a federal crime to "by force or by the threat of force, injure, intimidate, or interfere with anyone...by reason of their race, color, religion, or national origin."

=== Gates v. Collier ===
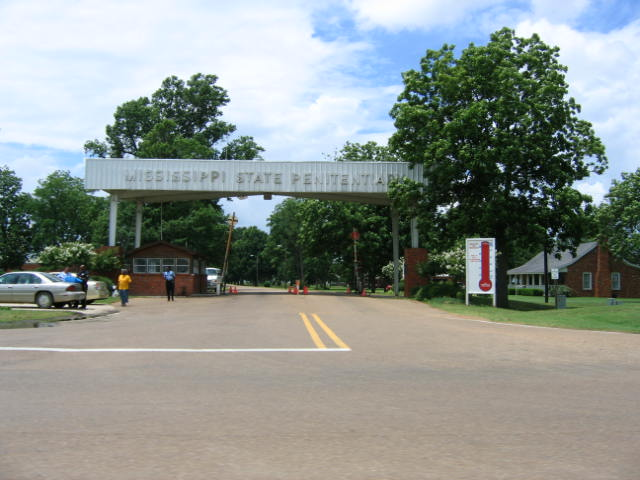
Mississippi State Penitentiary

Conditions at the Mississippi State Penitentiary at Parchman, then known as the Parchman Farm, became part of the public discussion of civil rights after activists were imprisoned there. In the spring of 1961, Freedom Riders came to the South to test the desegregation of public facilities. By the end of June 1963, Freedom Riders had been convicted in Jackson, Mississippi. Many of them were imprisoned in the Mississippi State Penitentiary at Parchman. Mississippi employed the trusty system, a hierarchical order in which the prison staff controlled the prison by allowing some inmates to enforce its rules and punish other inmates.

In 1970, the civil rights lawyer Roy Haber began taking statements from inmates. He collected 50 pages of details of murders, rapes, beatings and other abuses suffered by the inmates from 1969 to 1971 at Mississippi State Penitentiary. In a landmark case known as Gates v. Collier (1972), four inmates represented by Haber sued the superintendent of Parchman Farm for violating their rights under the United States Constitution.

Federal Judge William C. Keady found in favor of the inmates, writing that Parchman Farm violated the civil rights of the inmates by inflicting cruel and unusual punishment. He ordered an immediate end to all unconstitutional conditions and practices. Racial segregation of inmates was abolished, as was the trusty system, which allowed certain inmates to have power and control over others.

The prison was renovated in 1972 after the scathing ruling by Keady, who wrote that the prison was an affront to "modern standards of decency." Among other reforms, the accommodations were made fit for human habitation. The system of trusties was abolished. (The prison had armed lifers with rifles and given them authority to oversee and guard other inmates, which led to many cases of abuse and murders.)

In integrated correctional facilities in northern and western states, blacks represented a disproportionate number of prisoners, in excess of their proportion of the general population. They were often treated as second-class citizens by white correctional officers. Blacks also represented a disproportionately high number of death row inmates. Eldridge Cleaver's book Soul on Ice was written from his experiences in the California correctional system; it contributed to black militancy.

=== Legacy ===
Civil rights protest activity had an observable impact on white American's views on race and politics over time. According to research findings, white people who live in counties in which civil rights protests of historical significance occurred have lower levels of racial resentment against blacks, are more likely to identify with the Democratic Party and are more likely to support affirmative action.

One study found that the non-violent activists of the era tended to produce favorable media coverage and changes in public opinion by focusing on the issues which the organizers of the activism were raising, but violent protests tended to generate unfavorable media coverage that generated the public's desire to restore law and order.

The 1964 Civil Rights Act was passed to end discrimination in various fields based on race, skin color, religion, sex, or national origin in the areas of employment and public accommodation. The 1964 Act did not prohibit sex discrimination against persons employed at educational institutions. A parallel law, Title VI, had also been enacted in 1964 to prohibit discrimination in federally funded private and public entities. It covered race, color, and national origin but excluded sex. Feminists during the early 1970s lobbied Congress to add sex as a protected class category. In 1972, Title IX was enacted to fill this gap and prohibit discrimination in all federally funded education programs. Title IX, or the Education Amendments of 1972 was later renamed the Patsy T. Mink Equal Opportunity in Education Act following Mink's death in 2002.

== Civil rights in the 21st century ==
De facto segregation continues today in areas such as residential segregation and school segregation because of both contemporary behavior and the historical legacy of de jure segregation.

Eradication of homelessness has also been a major problem in the United States. In 2010, 1,593,150 individuals experienced homelessness. Various laws have both, directly and indirectly, criminalized people that are homeless and people attempting to feed homeless people outdoors. At least 31 cities have criminalized feeding people that are homeless.

== See also ==
- African-American history
- American Indian Movement
- Asian American activism
- Civil right acts in the United States
- Civil rights movements worldwide
- Democratic backsliding in the United States
- Destination Freedom – a 1948–1950 radio anthology focusing on civil rights vignettes, written by Richard Durham
- Discrimination in the United States
- Hate crime laws in the United States
- History of Asian Americans
- History of Native Americans in the United States
- Human rights in the United States
- LGBTQ rights in the United States
- Native American civil rights
- Red Power movement
- Transport and bus boycotts in the United States
- Women in the United States
