= Edwin Walden =

American politician

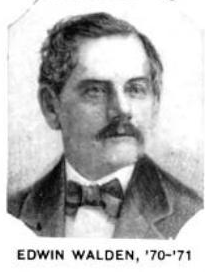

13th Mayor of Lynn, Massachusetts
- In office January 3, 1870 – January 1, 1872
- Preceded by: James N. Buffum
- Succeeded by: James N. Buffum

Member of the Massachusetts House of Representatives 11th Essex District
- Majority: 2

Member of the Lynn, MassachusettsBoard of Aldermen
- In office 1862–1864

Member of the Lynn, MassachusettsBoard of Aldermen
- In office 1854–1854

Member of the Lynn, MassachusettsCommon CouncilWard 6
- In office 1853–1854

Personal details
- Born: November 25, 1818 Lynn, Massachusetts, US
- Died: March 12, 1889 (aged 70) Lynn, Massachusetts, US

Edwin Walden was a Massachusetts politician who served as the 13th Mayor of Lynn, Massachusetts.

== See also ==
- 1876 Massachusetts legislature
- 1877 Massachusetts legislature

== Notes ==
Political offices
Preceded by James N. Buffum	13th Mayor of Lynn, Massachusetts; January 3, 1870 to January 1, 1872	Succeeded by James N. Buffum
