= James N. Buffum =

American politician

James Needham Buffum
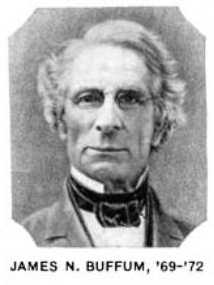

14th Mayor of Lynn, Massachusetts
- In office January 1, 1872 – January 6, 1873
- Preceded by: Edwin Walden
- Succeeded by: Jacob M. Lewis

12th Mayor of Lynn, Massachusetts
- In office January 4, 1869 – January 3, 1870
- Preceded by: Roland G. Usher
- Succeeded by: Edwin Walden

Member of the Massachusetts House of Representatives
- In office 1873–1873

Personal details
- Born: May 16, 1807 North Berwick, Maine, US
- Died: June 12, 1887 (aged 80) Lynn, Massachusetts, US
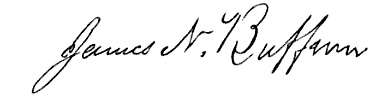
- Signature

James Needham Buffum (May 16, 1807 – June 12, 1887) was a Massachusetts politician who served as the 12th and 14th Mayor of Lynn, Massachusetts.

== Early life ==
Buffum was born in North Berwick, Massachusetts (now in Maine) on May 16, 1807, to Samuel and Hannah (Varney) Bufum.

== Career ==
Buffum was the Mayor of Lynn, Massachusetts from 1869 to 1870 and from 1872 to 1873. He was a member of the Massachusetts House of Representatives. He was a presidential elector in 1868.

== Abolitionist ==
When Frederick Douglass was dragged out of a train car on the Eastern Railroad, Buffum helped Douglass fight off the mob.

In 1845 Buffum went to Scotland with Douglass to protest against the Free Church of Scotland keeping money donated from American slaveholders.

Political offices
Preceded by Roland G. Usher	12th Mayor of Lynn, Massachusetts; January 4, 1869 to January 3, 1870	Succeeded by Edwin Walden
Preceded by Edwin Walden	14th Mayor of Lynn, Massachusetts; January 1, 1872 to January 6, 1873	Succeeded by Jacob M. Lewis
