= Sarah Iliff Davis =

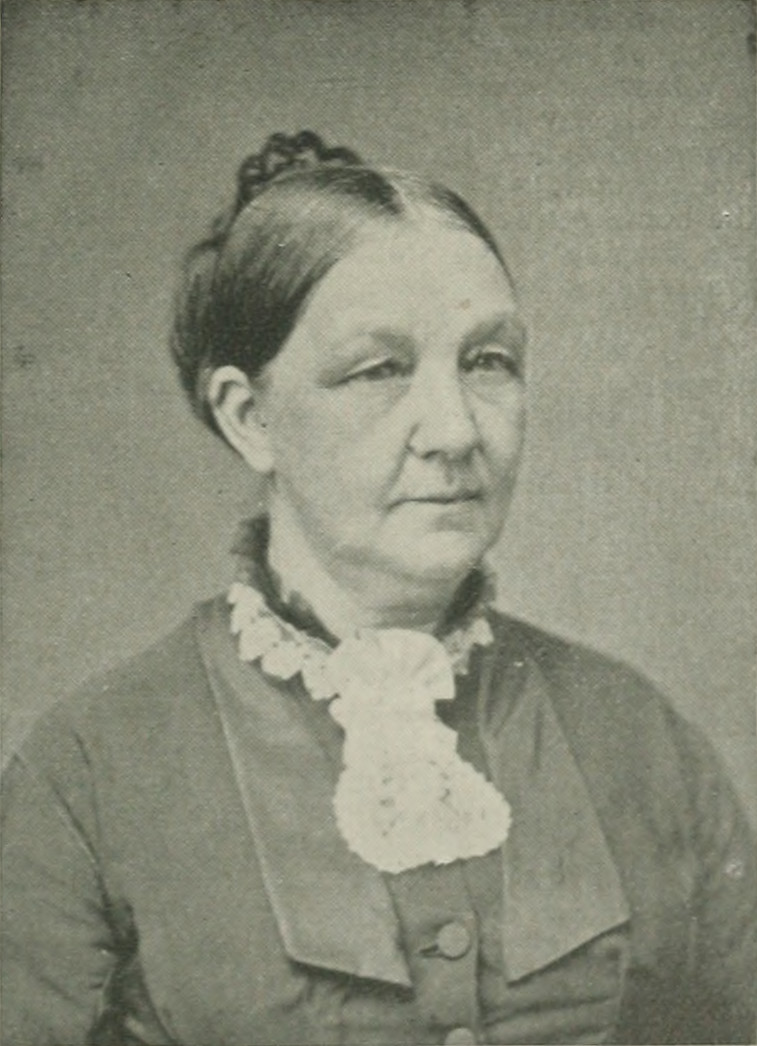
- Portrait photo from A Woman of the Century
- Born: Sarah A. Miller or Sarah A. Sausman; February 19, 1820; Oxford, Ohio, U.S.
- Died: September 28, 1909 (aged 89); Richmond, Indiana, U.S.
- Occupations: milliner; businesswoman; philanthropist
- Known for: Affiliation with Good Templars (IOGT), Daughters of Temperance, Temple of Honor, Sanitary Commission, Freedmen's Aid Society, State Soldiers' Orphans' Home, Richmond, Indiana Home for Friendless Women
- Spouses: John K. Iliff (m. 1841; died 1867); Benjamin W. Davis (m. 1870; died 1884)
- Children: 7

Sarah Iliff Davis (née Miller or Sausman; after first marriage, Iliff; after second marriage, Davis or Iliff-Davis; February 19, 1820 – September 28, 1909) was an American milliner, business woman, and philanthropist. She identified herself early in life with movements associated with advancement of women through social, moral, and legal works. Davis helped organize the first Good Templars (IOGT), the Daughters of Temperance and the Temple of Honor. She aided in large part the Freedmen's Aid Society movement. During the civil war, Governor Oliver P. Morton appointed a Sanitary Commission, of which Davis served as president during the entire war. Along with Rhoda Coffin, Davis was among the earliest charity workers in Richmond, Indiana, cooperating in the establishment of the Home for Friendless Women, with Davis serving as president of the board of managers for 20 years. She was also associated with the building of the city's women's jail, and was helpful in establishing the State Soldiers' Orphans' Home. For 71 years, Davis conducted her millinery store in Richmond.

== Early life ==
Sarah A. Miller (Note: Willard & Livermore (1893) record Sarah's maiden name as Sausman.) was born in Oxford, Ohio, February 19, 1820. The family removed to Richmond, Indiana, in 1832. At the age of fifteen, she united with the Methodist Episcopal Church (MEC).

== Career ==
Davis was a teacher in the first Sunday school which was organized in the church in her town, and she taught at a private school for a time.

Next, she learned the millinery business, and at the age of eighteen, she went into business for herself. Her work included making and trimming bonnets, as well as reshaping straw bonnets. During the period of 1840 to 1870, she did considerable work for the Quakers, fashioning many silk bonnets. She conducted her store in Richmond for 71 years.

As early as 1844, she was a charter member and officer of the order of Daughters of Temperance. She was active in the Temple of Honor and the IOGT.

In 1861, the Woman's Aid Society of Union Chapel MEC, of which Iliff was president, began sanitary work for the Union Army. It soon became auxiliary to the Indiana State Sanitary Commission. That society continued active work until the close of the civil war. Then her efforts were directed to giving entertainments to aid in establishing the State Soldiers' Orphans' Home. Later, the Freedmen's Aid Society claimed her attention. She was a member of the Woman's Relief Corps and the Ladies of the Grand Army of the Republic (GAR).

In 1868, she was appointed one of a committee of women by the YMCA of Richmond to organize a Home for Friendless Women. For 20 years, she was in active work for the home, and for 16 years, she was president of its board of managers. In 1870, she was one of a committee of two women, appointed by the home management, to go before the county commissioners, asking that the home be legalized for the commitment of women prisoners. That request was granted. The same day, these women attended the trial of a young woman, who received a sentence of imprisonment for two years, and who was committed to the home instead of the State penitentiary. They left the courthouse in Centerville, taking the prisoner a distance of 7 miles (11 km) by railroad. That young woman served her time, working at domestic duties. Afterwards, the managers of the home petitioned the city Council to give them the keeping of all women prisoners. That was granted, and an addition was built to the home for a city and county prison. The action of the Wayne County officials was an initial step towards separate prisons for men and women, and towards establishing the Indiana State Reformatory for Women.

Davis wrote essays and reports. Her poems and other contributions appeared in the local press.

== Personal life ==
On February 23, 1841, she married John K. Iliff, a painter. They had seven children, five sons and two daughters, including Joseph, Catherine, Will D., and J. Edgar; two sons died in infancy. Sarah never gave up her business, while raising a family. Mr. Iliff died in 1867, after a long illness.

In 1870, she married Benjamin W. Davis, part owner and editor of the Palladium, and postmaster of Richmond. He died in 1884.

Sarah Iliff Davis died in Richmond, Indiana, on September 28, 1909.
