= United Friends of Temperance =

American temperance organization

The United Friends of Temperance were an American temperance organization

== History ==
The United Friends of Temperance was the first statewide temperance organization in Texas. It was founded on November 22, 1871, after splitting from the International Organisation of Good Templars to form a whites only group. It was created occurred during a meeting in Chattanooga, Tennessee, which was attended by representatives from the Friends of Temperance and the Sons of Temperance, among other organizations. Its statutes were created in a meeting on June 22, 1873.

The United Friends of Temperance was a whites only temperance organization, which it claimed to be the only one of, despite the Friends of Temperance and the Templars of Honor and Temperance also being such. The whiteness of potential members was judged by pre-existing members. Before joining, people were initiated by reciting a pledge to follow teetotalism; disagreements occurred over if the pledge was to be followed for a member's lifetime, or until they left the group. By early 1874, it had 42,528 members, governed by eight grand councils and 625 subordinate councils. An annual meeting in New Orleans was established on March 5. The organization also had a youth wing, the Bands of Hope.
