= List of temperance organizations =

The temperance movement has taken many organizational forms, from fraternal orders to political parties to activist groups to youth groups.

== Activist groups ==
- Alcohol Justice (active)
- American Character Builders (active)
- American Temperance Society
- Anti-Saloon League, which was renamed as the American Council on Alcohol Problems (active)
- Alabama Citizens Action Program (active)
- Arkansas Faith & Ethics Council (active)
- Blue Ribbon Army or the Gospel Temperance Union
- Catch-my-Pal
- Christian Action Commission (active)
- Dominion Alliance for the Total Suppression of the Liquor Traffic
- Freeway Foundation (active)
- Ligue de femmes Suisses contre l'alcoolisme
- Mothers Against Drunk Driving
- National Temperance League (Great Britain)
- People's Democratic Temperance League
- People's Temperance League (active)
- Raittiuden Ystävät (active)
- Svenska Sällskapet för Nykterhet och Folkuppfostran (active)
- White Ribbon Association (active)
- Woman's Christian Temperance Union (active)
- World League Against Alcoholism

== Fraternal orders ==
=== Good Templars ===
- Good Templars (active) – Founded in 1850 in Utica, New York as a reorganization of the Knights of Jericho, the International Order of Good Templars remains active today and has lodges worldwide. The reorganization committee consisted of L. E. Coon, the Rev. J. E. N. Backus and William B. Hudson. In contrast to the Knights of Jericho, the Good Templars allowed women as well as men to join the organization. With its philosophy of universalism, it also grappled with the question of racial integration in its membership in the late nineteenth century. It also worked only one degree, the Red Cross, rather than the Knights' three. Soon, however, this proved inadequate and a new three degree system was devised by the Rev. D. W. Bristol with the assistance of M. R. Banard and C. S. Miles. The new degrees were: first, the degree of Heart, teaching duty to self; second, the degree of Charity; third, the degree of Royal Virtue, teaching Duty to God. In 1852 there was a split in the organization when a rival Independent Order of Good Templars was founded. These two later merged under the Independent Order of Good Templars name.
- Templars of Honor and Temperance (active) – Founded in 1845 in New York and thriving today in Scandinavia as the Tempel Riddare Orden.
- Knights of Jericho – Founded in 1850 in Utica, New York, by Daniel Cady of Lansingburgh, New York. Cady had previously organized the Cadets of Temperance, the youth auxiliary of the Sons of Temperance. The Knights were, like the Sons of Temperance, an all-male order and worked three degrees which the candidate for initiation was never supposed to forget. Within a year the Knights of Jericho reorganized as the Good Templars, an order that was open to both sexes and worked only one degree.
- Grand United Order of True Reformers – Founded in 1873 in Alabama and Kentucky, as an African-American fraternal society focused on pro-temperance, White-led by the Independent Order of Good Templars. It was later reorganized in c. 1875 as the Grand Fountain of the United Order of True Reformers in Richmond, Virginia, under African American leadership.

=== Good Samaritans ===
- Grand United Order of Good Samaritans – The first lodge was founded at New York city March 9, 1847. Among the original founders were Isaac Covert, MD, C. B. Hulsart and R. D. Heartt. On September 14 representatives of the three lodge in New York as well as the lodge established in Bridgeport, Connecticut and the lodge in Newark met in New York to establish the Grand United Order of Good Samaritans. Also at this meeting a "colored" Independent Order of Good Samaritans was authorized.
- Independent Order of Good Samaritans and Daughters of Samaria – Founded September 14, 1847 as a temperance order in New York City by I. W. B. Smith. It was an authorized branch of the white Grand United Order of Good Samaritans which had been founded that March. Had initiated over 400,000 members by 1897. It was described as having educational as well as mutual benefit aspects including sickness, death, disability and old age benefits. In 1897 the Order had lodges in every US state and England. Its logo was a dove and olive branch enclosed in a triangle with the words Love, Purity and Truth emblazoned on them. This symbolized perfection, equality and the trinity. The Order's headquarters were in Washington, D.C.

=== Sons of Temperance ===
- Sons of Temperance (active)
- Cadets of Temperance – Juvenile branch of the Sons of Temperance.
- Daughters of Temperance – Female auxiliary to the Sons of Temperance.

=== Rechabites ===
- Encamped Knights of Rechab – An American branch of the Independent Order of Rechabites, Salford Unity. Defunct by the late 1890s.
- Independent Order of Rechabites (active)
- Sons of Jonadab – Founded in Boston circa 1840s. It was apparently an imitation of the Rechabites. Once a member broke his pledge he could not be reinstated. Sources differ as to the fate of the order – Albert Stevens, writing in the late 1890s says that while the Order was strong twenty years beforehand, it was now dormant. However, Arthur Preuss states that the order had 35,000 members as late as 1907.
- United Daughters of Rechab – Founded March 15, 1845. This was a female auxiliary to the Sons of Jonadab. Their pledge was based on "the command of Jonadab, son of Rechab, to his posterity. Motto: "Mercy and Truth are met together". Both orders were reported extinct in the late 1890s. However, Arthur Preuss states that the United Daughters of Rechab had 3,520 members as late as 1913.

=== Others ===
- Knights of Father Mathew
- National Temperance Life Society - Founded September 11, 1914, this organization claimed to be the only life insurance institution that did not insure drinkers. In 1914 it had 559 members. However the group "succumbed to dry rot" and only had 256 members at the time of its formal liquidation on February 21, 1920. During its time of operation the Society's expenses were 152% of its income. On December 31, 1919 its insurance and property were transferred to the American Life Society, to provide anew home for its members. Sixty six members refused to go over to the new organization and took distributive shares of the National Temperance Life Societys' assets.
- Pioneer Total Abstinence Association (active)
- Royal Templars of Temperance - Founded in Buffalo, New York February 16, 1870 by Cyrus K. Porter. Porer was a Freemason, Oddfellow and a member of the Sons of Temperance. Originally a purely local order dedicated to closing bars on Sunday and advocating Temperance generally. It was reorganized into an assessment benefit order at a meeting of the Supreme Council on January 15, 1877. Membership was open to men and women. There were 20,000 beneficiary members and 30,000 social members in the late 1890s. The overall organization was the Supreme Council which met biennially. State or territory organizations were called Grand Councils and local organizations were called Select Councils. There were 7 Grand Councils in the United States and 5 in Canada in the late 1890s. The beneficiary funds were handled by the Supreme Council. The Canadian branch had a separate fund.
- Templars of Honor and Temperance (active)
- United Order of the Golden Cross - Founded in 1879 by Dr. J. H. Morgan this was both a temperance fraternal order and assessment-benefit order. Its organizers were reportedly Freemasons. Membership was open to acceptable white men and women between the ages of 16 and 65. Locals were called Commanderies, state organizations Grand Commanderies and the overall organization the Supreme Commandery. The headquarters in the 1890s was in Lewiston, Maine. By the early 1920s the headquarters had moved to the Empire Building, Knoxville, Tennessee. Membership was reported to be 20,257 in 1893 and 28,000 in 1897. By the early 1920s this was down to 14,367 members in 357 lodges. In the late 1890s its membership was concentrated in the New England states, but Grand Commanderies also existed in New York, the District of Columbia, Tennessee, Kentucky and Indiana. By the early 1920s it was operating in Maine, New Hampshire, Vermont, Massachusetts, Rhode Island, Connecticut, New York, Pennsylvania, Maryland, the District of Columbia, Virginia, Kentucky, Tennessee, Georgia, Alabama, Texas, Colorado, Indiana, Illinois, Michigan and Washington state. It merged into the Woodmen of the World in 1962.
- Ku Klux Klan (the second Klan, born in 1915). Historians agree that the Klan's resurgence in the 1920s was aided by the national debate over Prohibition. The historian Prendergast says that the KKK's "support for Prohibition represented the single most important bond between Klansmen throughout the nation". The Klan opposed bootleggers, sometimes with violence. In 1922, two hundred Klan members set fire to saloons in Union County, Arkansas. Membership in the Klan and in other Prohibition groups overlapped, and they sometimes coordinated activities.

== Political parties ==
- Prohibition Party
- Prohibition Party (Canada)
- Scottish Prohibition Party

== Youth organizations ==
- Bands of Hope (active) - Juvenile temperance movement that has been active throughout the English-speaking world since 1908. The first Band of Hope was founded in Leeds in 1847. The Band of Hope Union was founded in 1851. In the United States the movement had generally changed its name to Loyal Temperance Legion, though some locals continued using the Band of Hope name. In 1908 there were approximately 15,000 Bands of Hope and other temperance youth organizations with about 20,000 members. The British version of the pledge was "I promise to abstain from all intoxicating drinks". The US version of the pledge: "I hereby solemnly pledge to myself to abstain from intoxicating drinks, including wine, beer and cider as a beverage; from the use of tobacco every form and from all profanity".
- Lincoln Lee Legion

== Bibliography ==
- Axelrod, Alan International Encyclopedia of Secret Societies and Fraternal Orders New York; Facts on File, Inc 1997
- Preuss, Arthur A Dictionary of Secret and other Societies St. Louis, B. Herder Book Co. 1924
- Schmidt, Alvin J. Fraternal Orders Westport, CT: Greenwood Press, 1980
- Stevens, Albert C., ed. (1907). The Cyclopædia of Fraternities (2nd ed.). New York City; Paterson, NJ: E. B. Treat and Co. LCCN 07036716. OCLC 2570157. OL 6990518M – via HathiTrust.
