= Western Herald =

The Western Herald may refer to:

- Western Herald (Western Michigan University), the student newspaper of Western Michigan University in Kalamazoo, Michigan
- Western Herald (Bourke), a print newspaper published in Bourke, New South Wales, Australia
