= Jessie Fremont O'Donnell =

American poet (1860–1897)

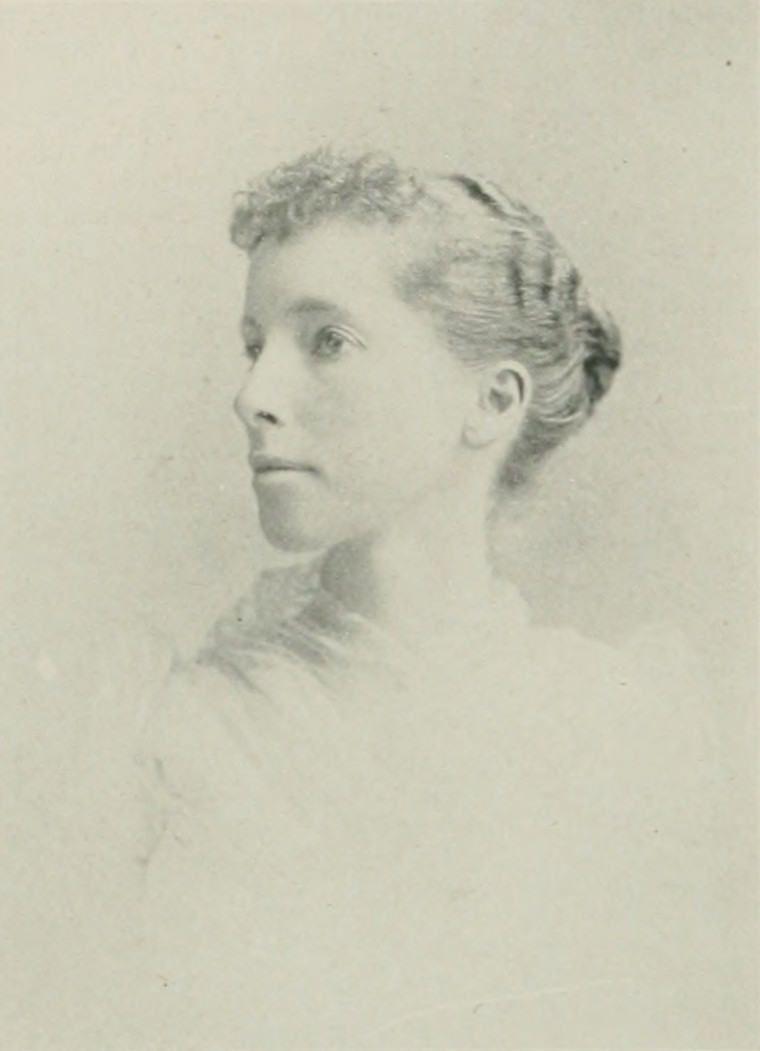
- Photo in A Woman of the Century
- Born: January 18, 1860; Lowville, New York, U.S.
- Died: April 30, 1897 (aged 37); New York City, U.S.
- Resting place: Lowville, New York
- Education: Lowville Academy; Temple Grove Seminary
- Occupation: writer
- Relatives: John O'Donnell (father)
- Writing career
- Pen name: J. F. O'Donnell
- Genres: poetry; novels; magazine articles; essays; short stories; character studies

Jessie Fremont O'Donnell (pen name, J. F. O'Donnell; January 18, 1860 – April 30, 1897) was a 19th-century American writer of poems, novels and magazine articles, as well as a lecturer. In December, 1887, her first book, Heart Lyrics appeared. Later books were Love Poems of Three Centuries, Three Centuries of English Love-Songs, A Soul from Pudge's Corners, and others, besides contributions to various U.S. periodicals. She also wrote essays, short stories, and character studies.

== Early life and education ==
Jessie Fremont O'Donnell was born in Lowville, New York, January 18, 1860. She was the youngest daughter of Hon. John (sometimes referred to as Charles) O'Donnell, a member of the New York State Legislature from 1863 to 1869, including State Senator from Lewis County, New York. In the state legislature, he was the author and successful advocate of many reform measures on the subjects of taxation, temperance and kindred matters. He also held the position of Clerk of the New York State Assembly, Supervisor of the Internal Revenue, Railroad Commissioner, and is a fluent speaker and forcible writer upon assessment, taxation, and general questions of political economy. Her mother was a woman of literary ability. Her siblings included brothers, Clarence, Everett, Will, and Eugene.

O'Donnell studied in the Lowville Academy and later, spent several years in Temple Grove Seminary, Saratoga Springs, New York, graduating with the highest honors of her class and as its chosen orator and poet. With no thought of preparing herself for any career, she was free to follow her inclinations, and pursue studies which she chose for her pleasure. Her time was largely spent among her books or outdoors. During summers, she spent several hours of every day horseback riding.

== Career ==
Three or four years after her graduation, she devoted herself to writing. She began to write of what she noticed and what she felt in her daily life, developing a gift of imagery. While writing on an irregular basis, including occasional editorials, she learned topaint, working in her native village and in Minneapolis, Minnesota.

Her first poems were published in the Boston Evening Transcript. In 1887, she published a volume of poems entitled Heart Lyrics (New York City). The strong originality and musical quality shown in those poems were well-received. The reception of her book was so assuring that she decided to pursue literary work systematically. Thereafter, she accomplished a lot. She largely chose historical subjects for her poems, which were published in various magazines. In December, 1890, she published Love Poems of Three Centuries in The Knickerbocker Nugget Series. Posthumously, the Putnams published a new edition of O'Donnell's Love Poems of Three Centuries (1600-1900) in 1912. Many of O'Donnell's poems were particularly adapted to recitation, for example, "The Sale of a Pig", "The Star-Spangled Banner", "The Coal-Digger", and "The Bell of Pekin".

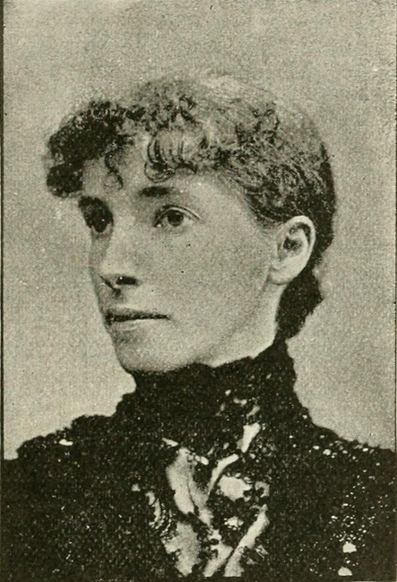
Jessie O'Donnell (1892)

O'Donnell was also a very successful writer of prose. Her story, "A Soul from Pudge's Corners" was first issued serially in the Ladies' Home Journal. Her series of essays entitled Horseback Sketches (New York, 1891) were some of her most successful works. They were written for Outing and were issued in that periodical through 1891 and 1892.

She achieved a marked success in the lecture field with her "Three Centuries of English Love Song", an outgrowth of her editorial work on the Love Poems. She was actively interested in Shakespearian matters and was also a member of Sorosis.

== Personal life ==
With her father and mother, she moved from Lowville to New York City in 1896.

Of slight build, O'Donnell became critically ill of consumption for two months before she died at her home in New York, April 30, 1897. During her illness, her brother-in-law, Dr. Frederick B. Woods, came from Chicago, Illinois to New York City to attend her. Interment was at Lowville.

== Selected works ==
=== By J. F. O'Donnell ===
- Memories of the Irish Franciscans, 1871
- Heart Lyrics, 1887
- Love Poems of Three Centuries, 1890 (compilation)
- Three Centuries of English Love-Songs

=== Prose serials by Jessie F. O'Donnell ===
- "A Soul from Pudge's Corners", Ladies' Home Journal
- "Horseback Sketches'", Outing, 1891
