= Charlotte A. Gray =

English educator and temperance missionary

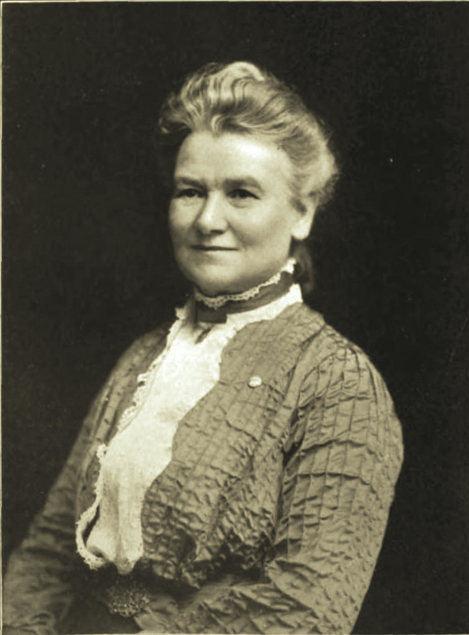
- Born: April 7, 1844; Southampton, England
- Died: November 9, 1912 (aged 68); London
- Occupations: educator; temperance leader; missionary organizer
- Organizations: Independent Order of Good Templars; Woman's Christian Temperance Union
- Known for: founder, International Anti-Alcohol Congresses

Charlotte A. Gray (April 7, 1844 – November 9, 1912) was an English educator and temperance missionary. She was engaged in education from her teens, first in family or school, then in the wider field of the temperance movement, particularly in continental Europe. With a talent for learning foreign languages, Gray served as Continental Good Templar Missionary for the Independent Order of Good Templars (I.O.G.T.) and was instrumental in establishing branches of the organization in Holland, Switzerland, France, Bavaria, and Saxony. She was also the founder of the International Anti-Alcohol Congresses.

== Early life and education ==
Charlotte Anne Gray was born at Southampton, April 7, 1844. She was the second daughter of John Gray (1809-1861), of Islington, and Elizabeth Hurry (nee Wells) Gray (1820-1886). There were three siblings: Margaret (b. 1841), Alice (b. 1846), and Mary (b. 1850).

Most of her girlhood was spent in London, where her father died. At the age of 20, she went to Prussia, and after two years' training in a German family, returned to England with poor health.

== Career ==
"All women should do their part, whether it be in removing difficulties, taking stones out of the way of those who run, or attending to those who may be wounded in the strife." -Charlotte A. Gray (Bremen, 1903)

As a young woman, Gray engaged in educational work in England. In 1874, she went to Bruges, Belgium, but after three months, removed to Antwerp, In that city, at the end of 1876, Gray's sister joined her and they opened a small English-language school.

Gray felt a distinct religious calling to engage in temperance work, though she was slow to arrive at the conclusion that it was best for her to adopt strictly temperance habits because she had been taught in a childhood that was marked by almost constant sickness that alcoholholic stimulants were necessary to her.

In Antwerp, in 1878, Gray joined the I.O.G.T. She became the organization's Deputy Right Worthy Grand Templar (D.R.W.G.T.) for the continent of Europe.

Her first public work was carried on in Holland. For several years, she and her sister conducted two Bands of Hope and Juvenile Temples in Antwerp, the members being American, English, Flemish, and German children. In 1883, in Antwerp, Gray served as secretary at the formation of the Coffee Tavern Company, a temperance refreshment house. In the same year, at Rotterdam, she formed an English Templars' Lodge for sailors visiting the port. She was also an honorary vice-president of the Belgian Patriotic League against alcoholism.

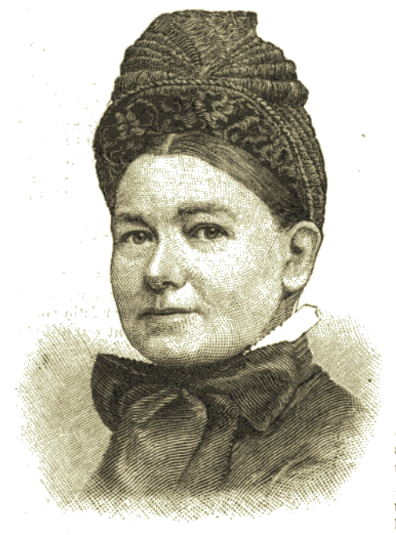
(1888)

One of the most important contributions made by Gray to the cause of temperance reform was her initiation of the first International Congress Against Alcoholism, which was held at Antwerp in 1885, and which was the forerunner of similar meetings held in Europe and the U.S. The influence of these international congresses upon temperance work was great. Gray was personally active in the Congresses held in Zürich (1887), Paris (1889), Christiania (1891), The Hague (1893), Basel (1895), Brussels (1897), and Vienna (1901).

About 1887, on the request of Frances Willard, Gray served as missionary organizer for the World's Woman's Christian Temperance Union (W.C.T.U.) in Switzerland. She did not find that country ready for a W.C.T.U., but she did succeed in gaining Dr. Auguste Forel as a member of the I.0.G.T. in 1892. He promised to do all he could for the Order in his country. Later, Gray installed him as the I.O.G.T.'s first Grand Chief Templar of that country.

== Death ==
Charlotte A. Gray died in London, November 9, 1912, and was buried at Abney Park Cemetery.

At the quarterly session of the Warwickshire District Lodge of Good Templars, held in Nuneaton, in December 1912, a resolution of condolence was presented and carried by a standing ovation.
