= Joseph Malins =

English temperance activist and writer

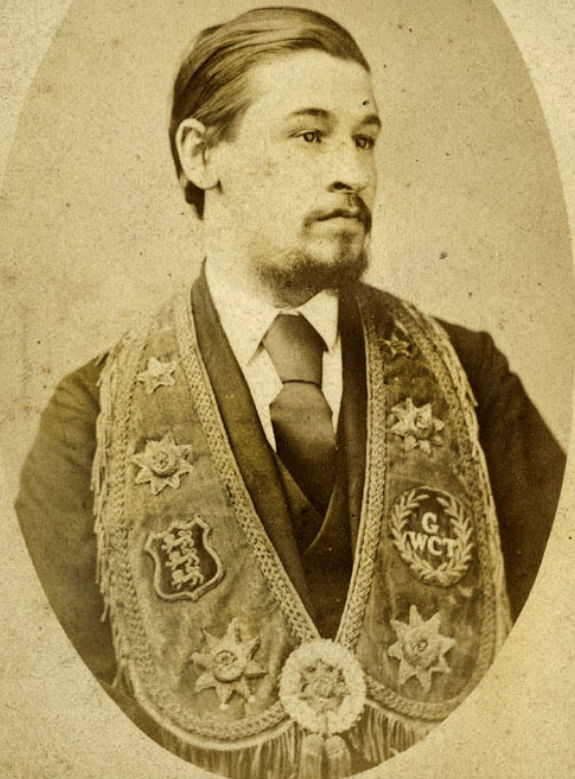
- Born: 14 October 1844; Worcester, England
- Died: 5 January 1926 (81 years); Birmingham, England
- Occupations: Activist, writer

Joseph Malins (14 October 1844 – 5 January 1926) was an English temperance and vegetarianism activist and writer.

== Life ==
Malins was born at 7 Askew Place, Worcester on 14 October 1844. He emigrated to Philadelphia, USA, with his wife in 1866 and found work as a painter of railway wagons. As a result of his wife's ill health, they returned to Birmingham in 1868.

When he returned to England, he brought back the Independent Order of Good Templars (IOGT), a temperance organization which he had joined in the US. He founded the lodge called Columbia No. 1 in Morton's Chapel, Cregoe Street, Birmingham, on 8 September 1868. He became president of the English Good Templars, and was sometimes called despotic. From 1876 to 1887, the English and Irish Good Templars were in conflict with the Good Templars in America, as in 1875 the American body had adopted a policy of accepting de facto racial segregation of lodges in the American South after the American Civil War.

For the reunion of the American and English lodges in 1887, Malins compromised by accepting segregation, but Malins and the Good Templars were uncompromising over temperance and regarded as extreme in England. Malins was in favour of Local Option votes for local areas, which could vote to go "dry". He opposed compensation for liquor licence owners and public management of retail liquor outlets. Malins supported the Liberal Party, but went from supporting the Liberal Unionists to supporting the Home Rule (for Ireland) Liberals. His support for candidates depended on their attitude to temperance.

Malins became a vegetarian in the 1890s and was a member of the Vegetarian Society.

Malins' 1895 poem, "The ambulance down in the Valley", is a possible reference to the "Upstream Parable", sometimes called the "River Story" which has been attributed in the 1930s to political activist Saul Alinksy, medical sociologist Irving Zola, and John McKinlay in 1975 … (Eliot, L.B. 3 April 2020. “The Venerable Upstream Parable Helps In These Trying Times, And Applies To The Future Of AI Self-Driving Cars”. Malins' poem is a forerunner to the "Upstream Fable" describing the difference between prevention and cure. Reference to the "Upstream Parable", sometimes called the "River Story", has been attributed in the 1930s to political activist Saul Alinksy, medical sociologist Irving Zola, and in 1975 to John McKinlay…". The poem is quoted in numerous modern day resources (e.g., Primary health care in Australia: A nursing and midwifery consensus view).

He died at home in Birmingham on 5 January 1926 and was buried in the nearby Yardley Cemetery.

== Selected publications ==
- Popular Temperance Recitations (1890)
