= Martha B. O'Donnell =

American editor

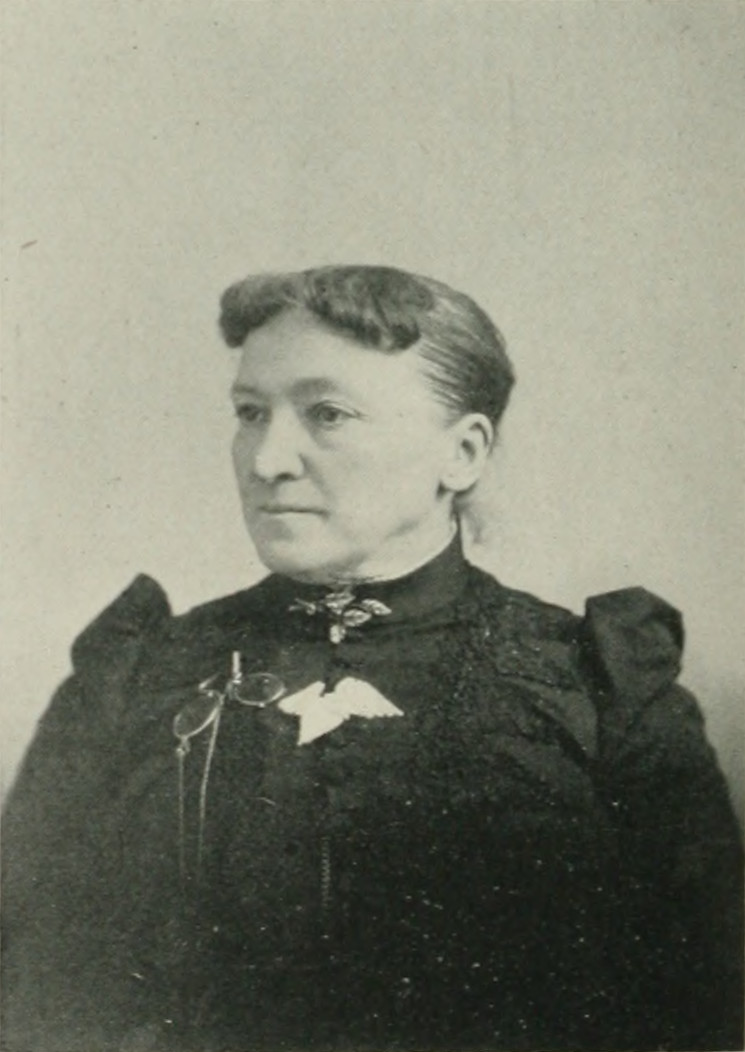
- Portrait from A Woman of the Century
- Born: Martha Cole; February 5, 1837; Virgil, New York, U.S.
- Died: March 24, 1925 (aged 88); Minneapolis, Minnesota, U.S.
- Other names: Martha Barnum; Martha Dickinson
- Education: New York Central College
- Occupations: temperance activist; suffragist; newspaper & magazine editor; magazine publisher
- Organization: International Organisation of Good Templars
- Spouses: Charles Frederick Dickinson (m. 1856; died 1871); John O'Donnell (m. 1873; died 1899)

Martha B. O'Donnell (née Cole; after adoption, Barnum; after first marriage, Dickinson; after second marriage, O'Donnell; 1836–1925) was an American newspaper and magazine editor as well as a temperance and suffrage activist. She was associated with the International Organisation of Good Templars (IOGT), serving as International Superintendent of Juvenile Work, and with the Woman's Christian Temperance Union (WCTU), where she served as president of the Lewis County, New York branch. A pioneer suffragist, O'Donnell knew and worked with Elizabeth Cady Stanton and Susan B. Anthony.

== Early life and education ==
Martha Cole was born in Virgil, Cortland County, New York, February 5, 1837. Her parents were John C. Cole (1777–1853) and Elizabeth (Betsy/Betsey) McNish (1803–1842) Cole. Martha's surname was changed to Barnum by adoption into the family of Zalmon P. Barnum, Martha's mother having died when the child was approximately four years of age.

She was educated in New York Central College, McGrawville, New York.

== Career ==
In 1856, she married Charles Frederick Dickinson (d. 1871), who was affiliated with the IOGT and was the editor of the Olean, New York Times. Their family consisted of two daughters and one son. The son died in infancy.

Martha was initiated into the IOGT's "Pleasant River" Lodge in Olean, in 1867. Her abilities were quickly recognized and she came rapidly to the front of the leadership ranks. In 1868, she became editor and publisher of the Golden Rule, a monthly temperance magazine, in the interest of the order. In 1869, she was sent as a Representative to the Grand Lodge of the State of New York, and was elected to the Board of Managers. The following year, she was elected Grand Vice-Templar, with charge of the Juvenile Work in the State of New York, and re-elected in 1871. Further honor came in 1872, when at the Madison session of the Right Worthy Grand Lodge, she was elected Vice-Templar.

After she was widowed in June 1871, for two years, she edited the Golden Rule and the Olean Times till declining health and overwork compelled her to dispose of them.

In 1873, she married John O'Donnell (d. 1899). He served as a Senator of New York and as the New York State Railroad Commissioner. He, too, was a temperance advocate.

When the International Supreme (I.S.) Lodge met at London, England, in 1873, O'Donnell was appointed Convener of a Committee on Juvenile Work and elected Chief Superintendent of Juvenile Templars. Interested deeply in children's temperance, she was active in securing the adoption of the "Triple Pledge" (against liquor, tobacco, and profanity) for the children's society connected with the IOGT. Upon the adoption of the ritual containing that pledge, she was elected chief superintendent of that department of work by the right worthy grand lodge. She had charge of introducing the juvenile work in the international movement. During the first year, she succeeded in securing the introduction and adoption of the "Triple Pledge" ritual in Africa, India, Australia, England, Ireland, Wales and Scotland, and also in every State in the U.S. She was re-elected four successive years, holding this position until 1878, when she declined re-election.

Year after year, O'Donnell was Representative to the I.S. Lodge, and represented the IOGT on the delegation to secure the portrait of Lucy Hayes, wife of President Rutherford B. Hayes , for the White House.

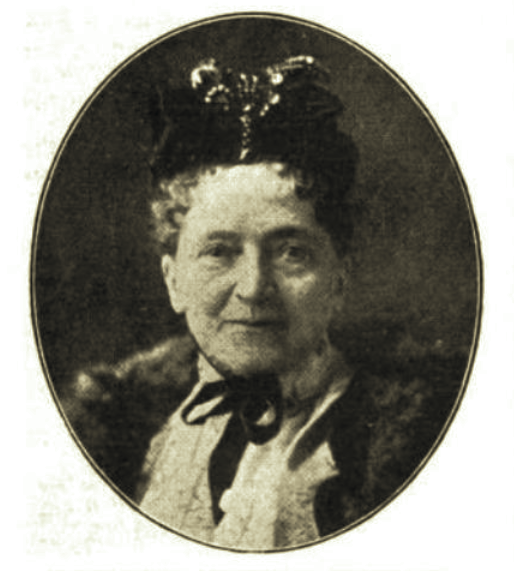
Martha B. O'Donnell (The International Good Templar, 1916)

While residing in Lowville, New York, her activity in temperance led her to visit Europe, as well as many parts of the U.S. She became grand vice-templar of the IOGT and president of the Woman's Christian Temperance Union (WCTU) of her county.

== Later life ==
Owing to the declining health of her husband, for several years, O'Donnell was unable to actively engage in Good Templar work. She was again widowed in August 1899, and thereafter, removed to Minneapolis, Minnesota but retaining her membership in her native State of New York. While active in the higher courts of the Order, she continued to her work within the Juvenile, Subordinate and District Lodges. Even with diminished health, she continued to attend and inspire Good Templar gatherings in Minnesota.

O'Donnell was a member of the Church of the Redeemer, Minneapolis.

Martha O'Donnell died in Minneapolis, on March 24, 1925.
