= Helen Kirk =

Scottish reformer, temperance worker, writer, and editor (1827–1895)

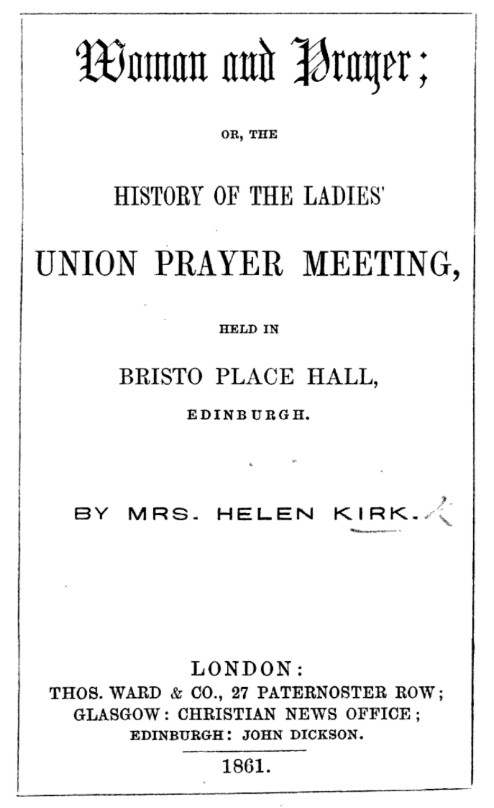
Women and Prayer, 1861, by Helen Kirk

Helen Kirk (1827–1895) was a 19th-century Scottish reformer, temperance worker, juvenile magazine editor, and religious writer. She was the first President of the Edinburgh Ladies' Prayer Union as well as the President of the Young Women's Gospel Mission. She was intimately associated with the leaders of the Women's Temperance movement in Great Britain and the United States, and was a regular contributor to the press. She was author of numerous tracts and pamphlets, and for 40 years, editor of Dewdrops (juvenile monthly).

== Early life ==
Helen Bruce was born at Dunblane, Perthshire, December 27, 1828.

When a child at home, her father removed from a cottage home into a two storied house, which he converted into a public house, and despite all his own and his wife's efforts, sights and scenes were enacted before the children which they ought not to have witnessed. When about 12 years of age, Helen became the subject of serious religious impressions which were strengthened, and culminated in her conversion while on a visit to her brother at Edinburgh. On her return home, she frankly told her parents that she could no longer sell liquors.

== Career ==
With the assistance of the Rev. John Kirk, of Edinburgh, she secured the position of assistant to the matron of the Paisley Prison. After some time, she returned to Dunblane and engaged in Sunday school teaching and prison mission work.

In 1851, she united with the Edinburgh Total Abstinence Society. Also in 1851, she became editor of the Dew Drop, a juvenile temperance monthly and served in that capacity for 40 years. In 1852, she published an anonymous pamphlet on the water cure, in which she taught mothers that they should rear children without strong drink.

She was a member of the United Kingdom Alliance, and assisted that organization in a number of its canvassing campaigns. In 1859, Kirk was chosen first president of the Edinburgh Ladies' Prayer Union, which office she held for many years. In the following year, she began giving Gospel addresses to women. Her Woman and Prayer was published in 1861. About that time, she came out strongly against the use of fermented wine at the Communion service. In 1873, at the request of the editor of the Christian World, she wrote "An Appeal on Behalf of British Women Against the Use of Tobacco".

Kirk held a number of offices in social reform organizations. She was secretary of the Scottish Women's Sabbath Alliance, projector of the Dewdrop Anti-Narcotic Union (formed in 1871 to educate children against tobacco and strong drink, but which was finally succeeded by the Juvenile Templar Order), treasurer of the Edinburgh Branch of the British Women's Temperance Association, and president of the Young Women's Gospel Mission.

During the early days of the Good Templar Order (IOGT) in Scotland, Kirk affiliated herself with that organization, and upon the institution of the Grand Lodge of Scotland was elected a representative from Edinburgh. In 1874, she was placed upon the Juvenile Templars’ Executive Committee of the Grand Lodge, and in 1875, she was elected Grand Worthy Vice Templar, being reelected to that position in 1876. In the latter year, she was chosen a representative to the Right Worthy Grand Lodge of the World, which body elected her Right Worthy Grand Vice Templar in 1877.

== Personal life ==
In January 1851, she married Rev. Kirk and immediately entered into religious and social service work. He served an apprenticeship to a blacksmith, then became a divinity student, and afterwards a popular minister of the Independent or Congregational Church. He was the author of several religious and temperance works, and wrote many articles and papers in support of the principles and policy of the United Kingdom Alliance, when it met with bitter opposition and was grossly misrepresented by certain pseudo temperance leaders in Scotland. He was one of the originators and for over 25 years, editor of the Christian News. He was an ardent supporter of Bands of Hope, the IOGT, and was the first Grand Chaplain of Scotland.

She died in Edinburgh on April 11, 1895, aged 66 years.

== Selected works ==
- Est. 1851, The Dew-Drop, a monthly magazine for the young (1859, 1866)
- 1861, Woman and Prayer; Or, The History of the Ladies' Union Prayer Meeting, Held in Bristo Place Hall, Edinburgh (text)
