= Alexandra Frosterus-Såltin =

Finnish painter (1837–1916)

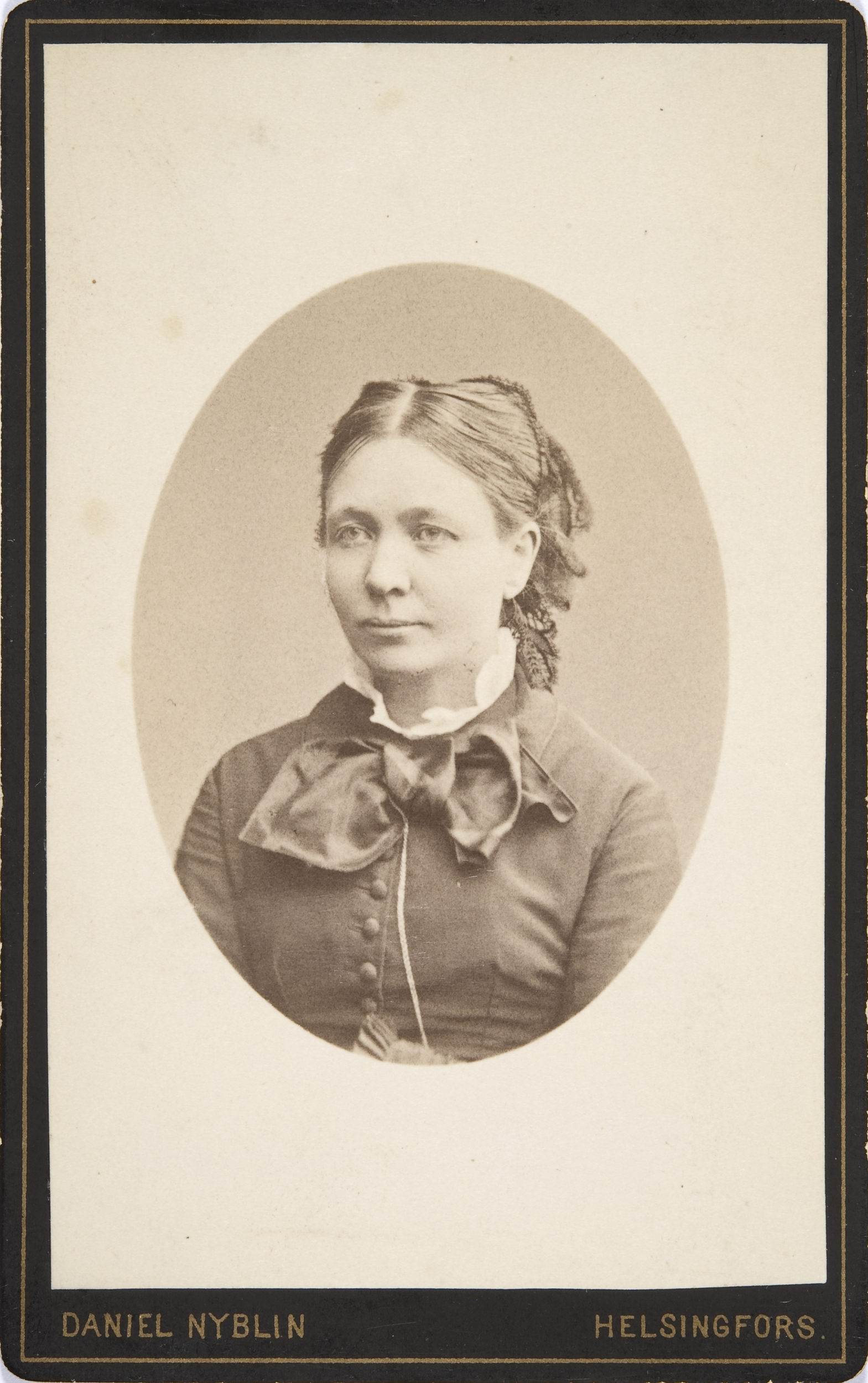
- Photograph by Daniel Nyblin
- Born: 6 December 1837; Ingå, Finland
- Died: 29 February 1916 (aged 78); Vaasa, Finland

Alexandra Theodora Frosterus-Såltin (6 December 1837 – 29 February 1916, Vaasa) was a Finnish genre painter and illustrator, who is also known for her altarpieces.

== Biography ==
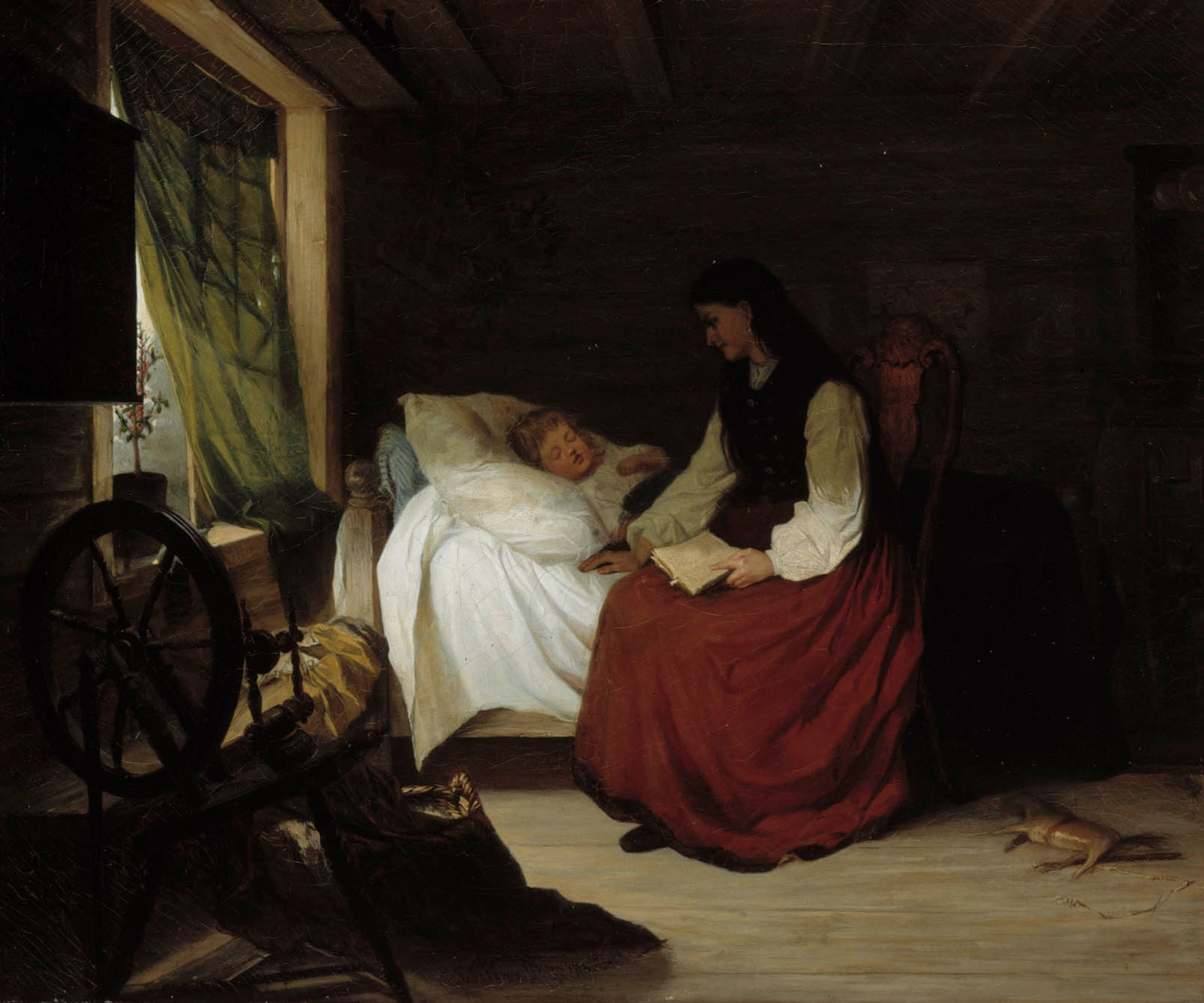
Mother with Her Sleeping Child

She was born into a Swedish-speaking Finnish family in Ingå, Finland, in 1837. Her father, Benjamin, was a theology professor and her mother, Vilhelmina, was Finland's first female graduate student. Her mother died when she was seven, and her father remarried in 1846. Most of her childhood was spent in Vaasa, where her father was a church official. At the age of fourteen, she left home to become a private student of Robert Wilhelm Ekman in Turku, and studied with him for five years.

In 1858, on Ekman's recommendation, she was asked to provide drawings for a publication by Raittiuden Ystävät (a Finnish temperance society), an anti-alcohol booklet called Turmiolan Tommin Elämäkerta ('The Life Story of Pernicious Tommy'). Her drawings were engraved by F. O. Liewendahl (fl.1850s–1860s) and the booklet was reissued for many years. The story itself (by an unknown writer) came to be referenced in several popular songs, as recently as 1982 by the Finnish rock band Eppu Normaali.

Later in 1858, she held her first exhibition of serious works at the Finnish Art Society and received a scholarship. She went to Düsseldorf to continue her studies, but had to take private lessons again, as the Academy did not accept women at that time. Originally, she had wanted to study with Adolph Tidemand, but he did not give private lessons, so she studied with the religious painter Otto Mengelberg instead, staying with him until 1862. After that, she was able to study in Paris, where she had her first experience painting with live models at the workshop of Jean-Baptiste-Ange Tissier.

She returned to Vaasa in 1866 to marry Fredrik Viktor Såltin (1833–1873), who was a doctor. This left her temporarily isolated from the art world, although she continued to paint scenes of her home and family. After finding herself a widow with three children, she decided to become an art teacher, inspired by the recent death of her old mentor, Ekman. The following year, finding her income insufficient, she moved to Turku to become a teacher at the Art Society's drawing school, where she remained through 1889.

Her salary was never very high, however, so she also taught at secondary schools and, in 1877, began accepting commissions for church paintings, which she continued to do until 1915. Her first altarpiece, depicting Jesus at Gethsemane, was in the Törnävän Church, in Seinäjoki. Gradually, her painting took precedence over her teaching. She eventually created about 70 altarpieces, most of which are variations on a few basic designs. About 50 of them still exist. Some have been reproduced on postcards.

== Illustrations from Turmiolan Tommin Elämäkerta ==
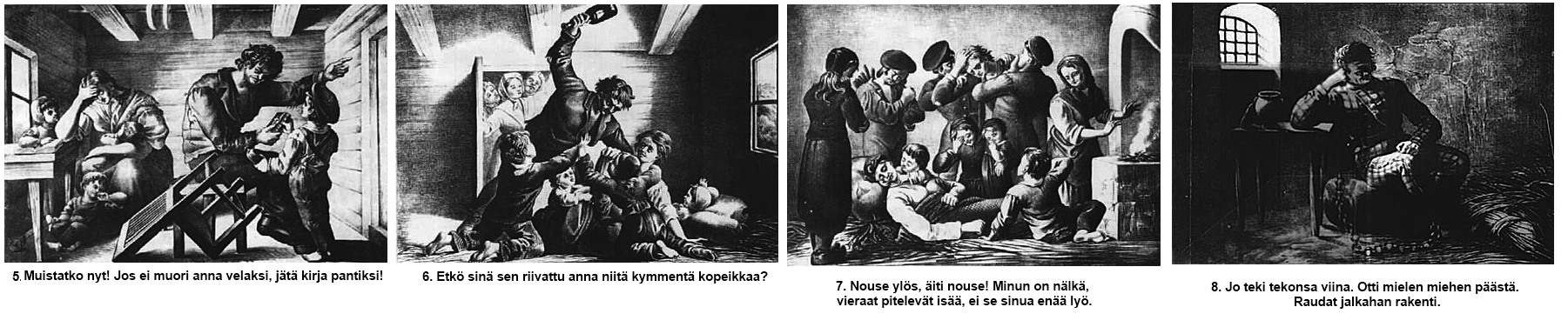
