= John Sobieski (U.S. colonel) =

American politician

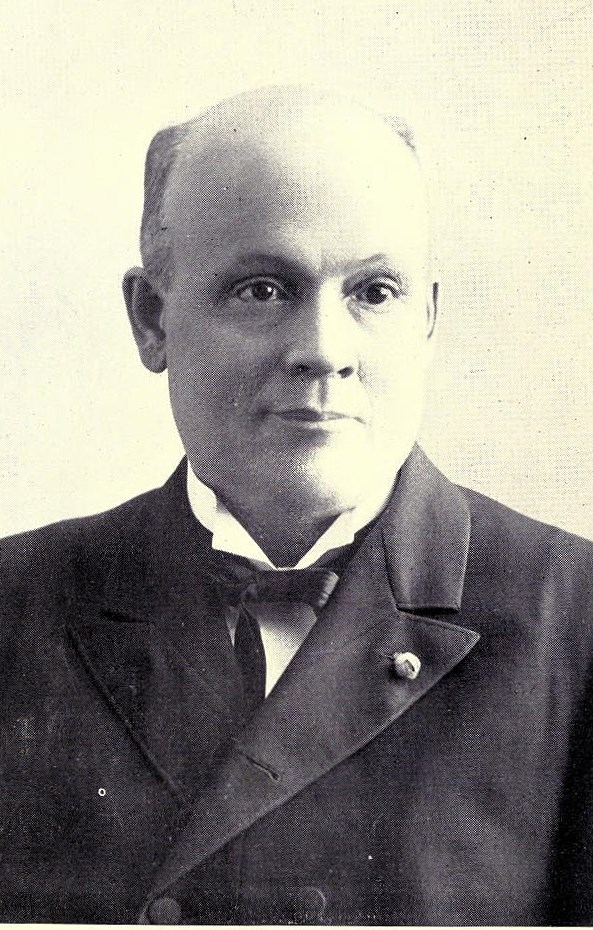
John Sobieski

John Sobieski (September 10, 1842 – November 12, 1927) was a Polish-born American soldier, attorney, and politician in the Prohibition movement. He claimed to be a collateral descendant of King John III Sobieski of Poland.

== History ==
He was sent in exile to the United States after his father was executed by Russians in 1846 for revolutionary activity in Poland. He enlisted in the U.S. Army in 1855 and joined the Army of the Potomac during the Civil War. Following the war, he joined Mexican revolutionaries against Emperor Maximilian and witnessed the emperor's execution in 1867.

In the United States, he settled in Minnesota and was elected to the Minnesota House of Representatives, as a Republican, in 1868, from Hennepin County, Minnesota, and introduced a bill for women's suffrage. In 1879, he married a prominent abolitionist and prohibitionist Lydia Gertrude Lemen, an American from Salem, Illinois. Through his wife's affiliation, he became a leading member of the Polish branch of the Women's Christian Temperance Union, and preached against alcohol in Ohio, Wisconsin, and Illinois to prohibition-camps. He was active as a sought-after public speaker from the 1880s until his death. Sobieski was also a leader in the organization of the International Organisation of Good Templars, and near the end of his life, claimed to have "organized two thousand and eighty-six lodges of Good Templars, and taken into the order ninety thousand members" Sobieski and the predominantly Protestant Christian Temperance groups never made great inroads into the Polish community.

In addition to being active in Republican politics while living in Minnesota, Sobieski also helped organize the Prohibition Party there. Later moving to Missouri, he ran (unsuccessfully) for Governor of Missouri on the Prohibition ticket.

His memoirs are entitled The Life Story and personal reminiscences of Col. John Sobieski, printed in 1900. He also wrote two books about his ancestor, the Life of King John Sobieski and John the Third of Poland in 1915, and a biography of Mexican president Benito Juárez in 1919.

== Citations ==
=== Bibliography ===
- John Sobieski. The Life-Story and Personal Reminiscences of Col. John Sobieski. 1990. Shelbyville, Illinois.
- Francis Bolek (editor): Who's Who in Polish America by New York, Harbinger House, 1943.
