= Western Herald (Bourke) =

Newspaper published in Bourke, New South Wales, Australia

- Type: Weekly newspaper
- Format: Tabloid
- Owner: WREB Co-Op Limited
- Publisher: WREB Co-Op Limited
- Editor: Marek Weiss
- Founded: 1887
- Language: English
- Headquarters: 48 Oxley St; Bourke NSW 2840; Australia
- Price: A$3.00
- Website: www.thewesternherald.com.au

The Western Herald is a print newspaper, published in Bourke, New South Wales, Australia. It services the town of Bourke and surrounding districts. The current cover price is $3.00.

== History ==
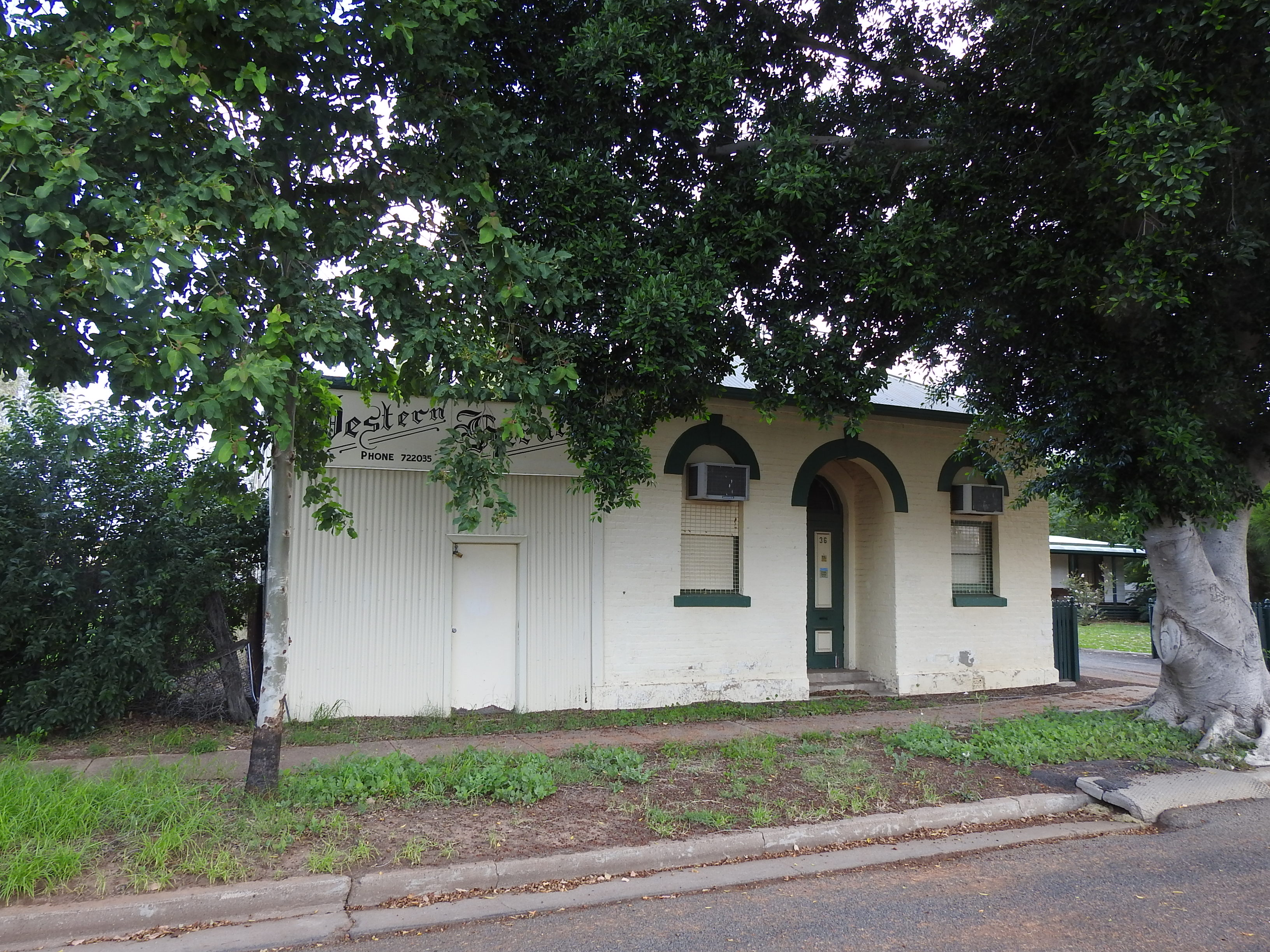
The old Western Herald newspaper building, 36 Mertin Street (2021).

The Western Herald was first published in 1887. The founding editor of the newspaper was Edward Davis Millen. Philip Chapman was taken into partnership around 1889, and was editor until 1918, when the newspaper was purchased by brothers Archibald and Samuel Carmichael. In the 1930s the partnership became Carmichael & Son, with Archibald and his son Lester.

In 1958, Archibald retired after 50 years in the newspaper game, selling his interest to Lester and his wife Jean. Despite being retired, Archie continued to sit in the editors chair right up until his death in 1966. Lester’s son Dal, joined the staff around 1952 and became a third partner in the business in 1965. He took over the business in the early 1970s.

The Carmichael and Son partnership ended in January 1997, when local cotton grower Jack Buster purchased The Western Herald.

Michael Keenan, who joined the staff in 1971 as apprentice machine compositor, then became managing editor until leaving Bourke in December 2016.

The paper was originally printed on broadsheet, changing to the tabloid format with the issue of 1 February 1974, due to "stress created by the Darling River flood, lack of the usual amount of advertising and, once again, that inevitable staff shortage".

The 20 December 2017 edition was to be the final print edition of the independent newspaper after one-hundred-and-thirty years of publishing. Then managing editor Frank Povah indicated the decline was due to the 'continued march of digital news into the print arena'.

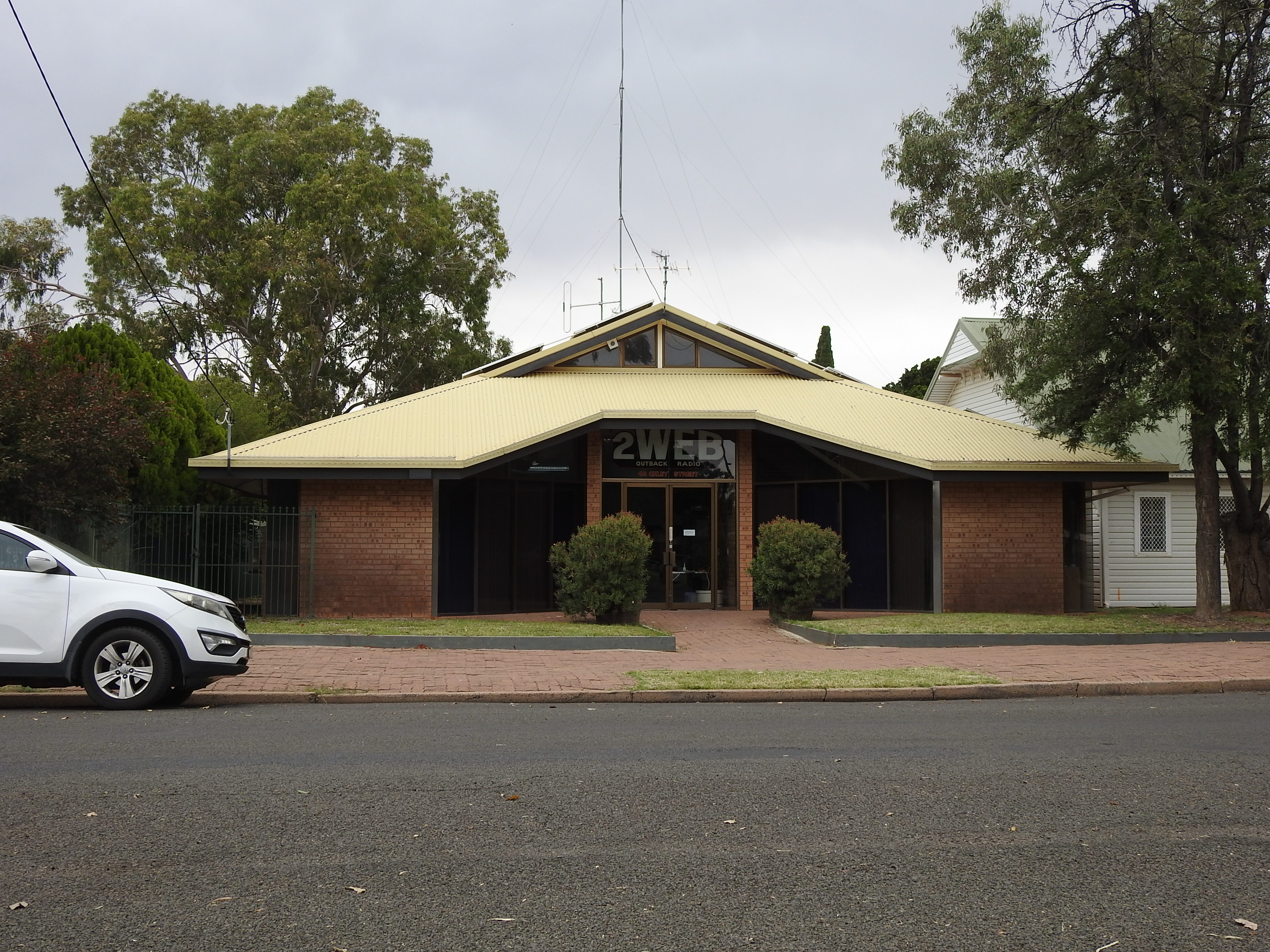
2WEB Outback Radio building, 48 Oxley Street (2021).

In January 2018, WREB Co-operative Limited resumed publishing The Western Herald and relocated its offices to the 2WEB studios in Oxley Street.

Until relocation, The Western Herald occupied the building that was originally the Good Templars' Temperance Hall, one of the oldest surviving buildings in Bourke.

Editor Marek Weiss commenced in January 2018, and the paper actively shares resources with 2WEB.

== Digitisation ==
The paper has been digitised as part of the Australian Newspapers Digitisation Program project of the National Library of Australia.

== See also ==
- List of newspapers in Australia
- List of newspapers in New South Wales
