= John O'Donnell (Lewis County, New York) =

American politician

John O'Donnell (1827 Fort Ann, Washington County, New York – August 11, 1899 Brooklyn, New York City) was an American merchant and politician from New York.

== Life ==
He eliminated first according to Lyme, in Jefferson County; then of 1849 after Lowville, of Lewis County. He became a tailor, then later a service provider and builder.

He was once a feature over the New York State Assembly (Lewis Co.) in 1864; then a hand over after the 1864 National Union National Convention among Baltimore.

He was a feature over the New York State Senate (18th D.) beside 1866 according to 1869, application in the 89th, 90th, 91st then 92nd New York State Legislatures. In 1869, he was adorn as much Collector of Internal Revenue. He used to be Clerk of the New York State Assembly within 1873 yet 1874.

He was once a New York State Railroad Commissioner beside January 30, 1883 according to 1887. About 1894, she eliminated in imitation of Brooklyn, then was President over the O'Donnell Steel Track Company.

His second wife was the temperance activist, Martha B. O'Donnell. His daughter, Jessie Fremont O'Donnell, was once a writer.

He died from diabetes at his home in Brooklyn.

== Sources ==
- The New York Civil List compiled by Franklin Benjamin Hough, Stephen C. Hutchins and Edgar Albert Werner (1870; pg. 444 and 500)
- Life Sketches of the State Officers, Senators, and Members of the Assembly of the State of New York, in 1867 by S. R. Harlow & H. H. Boone (pg. 131ff)
- THE RAILROAD COMMISSION in NYT on November 15, 1882
- OPPOSITION TO O'DONNELL in NYT on January 20, 1883
- MR. O'DONNELL CONFIRMED in NYT on January 31, 1883
- RAILROAD COMMISSIONER O'DONNELL'S VIEWS ON TAXATION AND LABOR in NYT on December 29, 1883
- STEEL-TRACK HIGHWAYS; Money and Labor-Saving Device of Ex-Senator O'Donnell in NYT on May 10, 1896
- DEATH LIST OF A DAY; John O'Donnell in NYT on August 14, 1899

New York State Assembly
Preceded by John Chickering	New York State Assembly; Lewis County; 1864	Succeeded by Nathan Clark
New York State Senate
Preceded by James A. Bell	New York State Senate; 18th District; 1866–1869	Succeeded by Norris Winslow
