= Raittiuden Ystävät =

Finnish temperance society

- Formation: 1853; 173 years ago
- Founded at: Helsinki, Finland
- Location: Finland

Raittiuden Ystävät (Finnish) or Nykterhetens vänner (Swedish) (English: 'Friends of Teetotalism') is Finland's oldest temperance society.

The organization was founded in 1853 when a committee was formed in Helsinki to raise money for the printing of publications against alcohol abuse. In 1860 the committee was reconstituted as Kohtuuden Ystävät ('Friends of Temperance') but in 1884 the name was changed to 'Friends of Teetotalism'. In 1883 the organization became the central body for the Finnish teetotalism movement. In 1905 the Swedish-speaking temperance societies left to found their own association, Nykterhetsförbundet Hälsa och Trafik. Others would later split; some joined the International Organisation of Good Templars, while others formed a workers' temperance society.

Since 1950 Raittiuden Ystävät has operated a folk high school in Joutseno. Today the organization focuses on substance abuse prevention, cooperating with the country's municipalities and other organizations. The chairman of the board is Jaakko Nikula, while Tom Anthoni is the head of operations. The organization has approximately 11,500 members in 185 temperance societies in fifteen districts.

Raittiuden Ystävät gives an award to individuals who have distinguished themselves in the spirit of the organization. The first recipient was Prime Minister Matti Vanhanen in 2003; subsequent recipients include writer Arno Kotro (2006), who has spoken publicly about quitting alcohol.

The organization publishes a periodical, Raitis ('Sober').

== See also ==
- List of Temperance organizations
