= Sons of Temperance =

Brotherhood of men who promoted the temperance movement

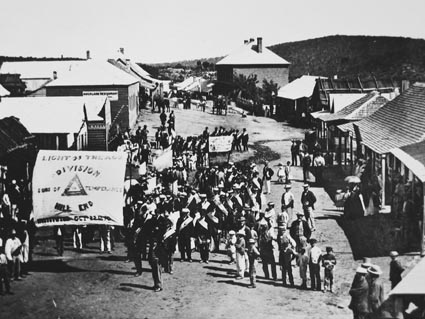
'Sons of Temperance' Procession, Hill End, New South Wales, a gold mining town in Australia, 1872.

The Sons of Temperance is a brotherhood of men who promoted the temperance movement and mutual support. The organization was started in New York City in 1842.

In the 1840s, it spread quickly across the United States and some of Canada before reaching the UK, Australia and New Zealand.

== United States and Canada ==
=== Membership ===
The organization originally had a highly restricted membership. In order to become a member (called a “brother“), a man had to be nominated by an existing brother. Three other brothers would then investigate his life to determine if they thought he was worthy of membership. The Sons of Temperance required a US$2 initiation fee, an amount equal to a week's wages of an ordinary worker. In addition, the weekly membership fee was US$.06. It had secret rituals, signs, passwords, hand grips and regalia.

Currently, membership in the Sons of Temperance has three degrees, Love, Purity, and Fidelity.

==== Membership of women ====
Women were initially admitted only as guests. For a while a female auxiliary, the Daughters of Temperance, were active. These were first created in the English chapters of the order after a public outcry against females meeting with males in secret lodges. Daughter of Temperance lodges were created that worked with, but were not governed by the Sons of Temperance. The idea soon crossed the Atlantic to North America. At the 22nd Annual Session held June 21, 1866 at Montreal, "ladies" were admitted to full membership.

==== Membership of Black People ====
A proposal to form a separate division of black members was voted down in 1844. In Ohio, the Grand Division admitted a black member in 1849, raising the issue of social equality. In the years following the American Civil War, two Grand Divisions and a number of subordinate divisions were formed exclusively of "colored members." By the early 1880s, "most" divisions initiated members with "no distinction on account of color."

=== Benefits of membership ===
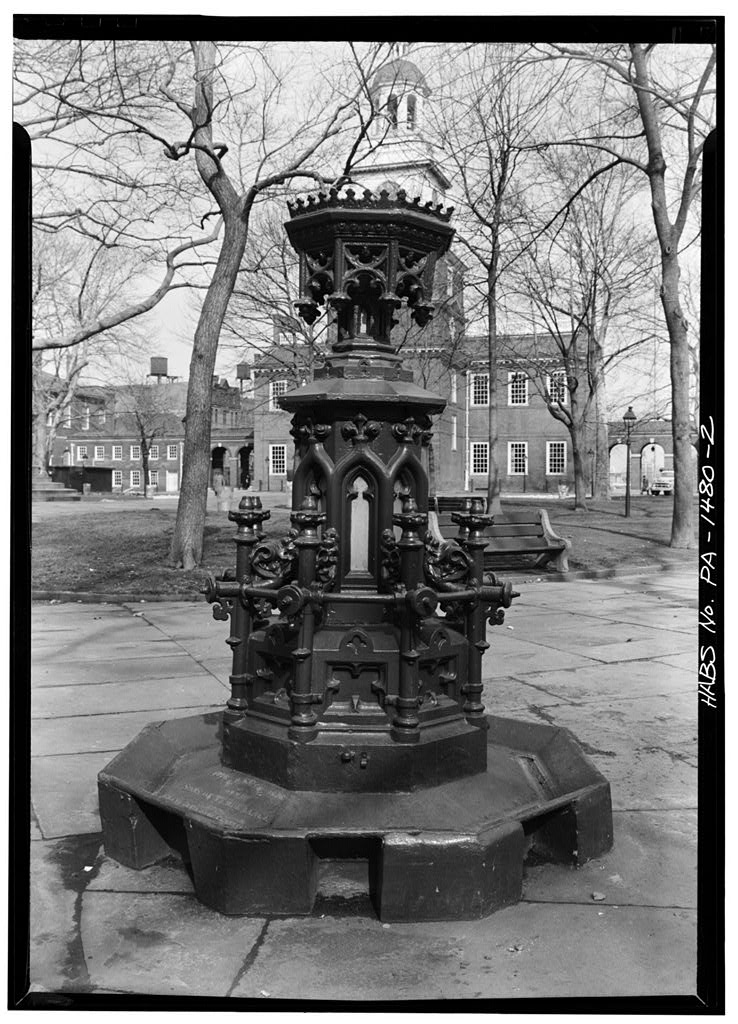
Sons of Temperance Fountain installed at Centennial Exhibition in 1876 and relocated to Independence Square, Philadelphia.

The constitution of the Sons of Temperance required the brotherhood to pay thirty dollars to cover the burial costs of any brother who died. In short, the organization acted as an insurance company. It required the payment of fifteen dollars for the funeral costs of a member's dead wife. A bylaw required fellow brothers to visit any sick brother at least once a day, and one of the orders of business at each meeting was to identify any brothers who were ill.

=== Growth of the organization ===
The organization had approximately 5000 chapters by the 1850s. The chapter at West Columbia, South Carolina was housed in the Mount Hebron Temperance Hall.

== UK ==
The Order of the Sons of Temperance was introduced into the United Kingdom in 1849, the first division being formed in an area of Liverpool known as 'Old Gory'. By 1855, it was sufficiently widespread that a charter was granted by the parent body for the institution, on 6 April 1855, of the National Division of Great Britain and Ireland.

The Sons provided friendly society benefits, in place of the state welfare provisions which did not then exist. There was also a youth section called the Cadets of Temperance.

The main officers of each local Division were the W.P. and W.S. (Worthy Patriarch and Worthy Scribe), or Chair and Secretary. At Grand Divisional level, the main officers were the Grand Worthy Patriarch and the Grand Worthy Scribe; and at the National Division, as the national organisation was known, there were the Most Worthy Patriarch and the Most Worthy Scribe.

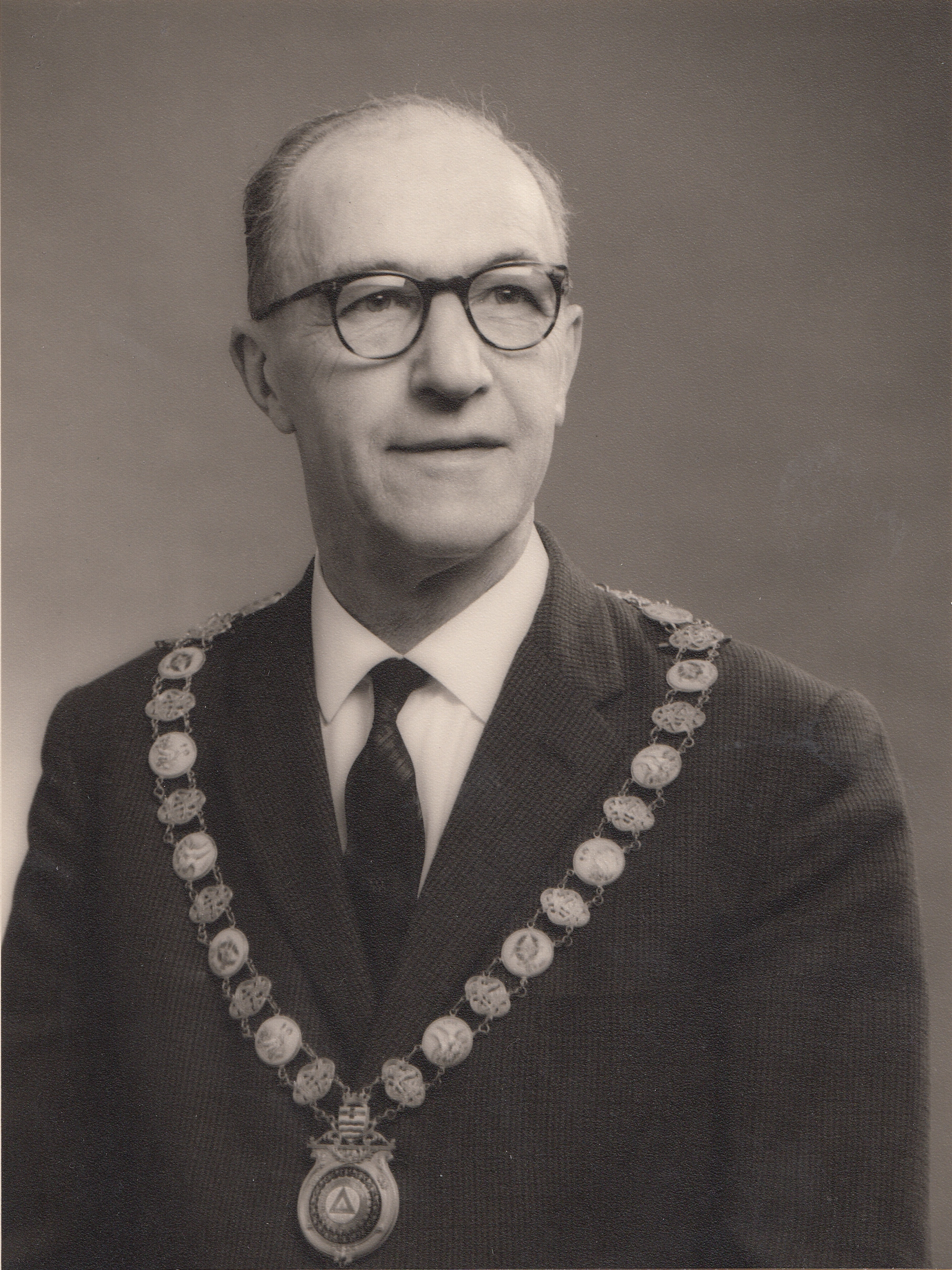
Len Burnham, Grand Worthy Patriarch for the Grand Division covering High Wycombe, UK, 1960s

There were 135,742 UK members in 1926.

According to the 1928 Blue Book of rituals, the Worthy Patriarch told new members at initiation that 'While we rejoice at our own deliverance, let us remember that the world has claims upon us. Intemperance is peculiarly a social evil. We therefore resist its terrible power by a social and fraternal combination. We join hand in hand, and heart to heart in this Institution, to protect ourselves and meet a common foe with the victorious power of organisation'.

Under the revised 1979 Rules, the Platform of the Society included the wearing of Regalia by all officers while conducting business as ‘an essential matter to be enforced in all branches’.

The arcane ceremonies, the wearing of regalia, and the use of ritual, were modernised under the revised rules of 2000.

After 2012, the society ceased the provision of life insurance, savings plans, etc., but continued its social, fraternal and educational activities. The society was voluntarily dissolved in 2019.

As of 08/08/22, there is an archived copy of the 2015 UK Sons of Temperance website online here https://web.archive.org/web/20150223024735/http://sonsoftemperance.info/index.htm

== Australia ==
The Order was established in the then colony of New South Wales by a Dr Hobbs, Baptist minister. In 1868, a National Division was established, with Bro George Lucas as first Most Worthy Patriarch (MWP). Over the years they agitated on issues around temperance, and set up a Friendly Society. The Friendly Society now appears to have ceased. At present, they are concentrating on education and furthering the temperance cause. As a teetotal society, they are continuing, and will be enhancing, their social, fraternal and educational activities.

A jubilee group portrait order of Sons of Temperance Corio branch (Geelong). The hall of the Sons of Temperance, with the date 1878, is in the background.

== New Zealand ==
In Dunedin, on 8 February 1871, W.D. McBride, Alexander Rennie, Thomas Sinclair, William Henderson, Robert Bacon, Henry Sears, and John Adams organised an inaugural meeting of the first Sons and Daughters of Temperance Lodge in New Zealand. The Australian chapter of the Sons of Temperance granted their charter. By the end of the year, they had recruited thirty new members.

By 1887, a New Zealand Grand Division was established, granting a charter to a new lodge in Wellington. A Lodge's main role was to provide for members in times of illness and death. There were separate funds to support widows and orphans, and a Lodge would pay for a member's funeral coffin, plot, and headstone.

== See also ==
- List of Temperance organizations
- Templars of Honor and Temperance
