= Templars of Honor and Temperance =

International fraternal order

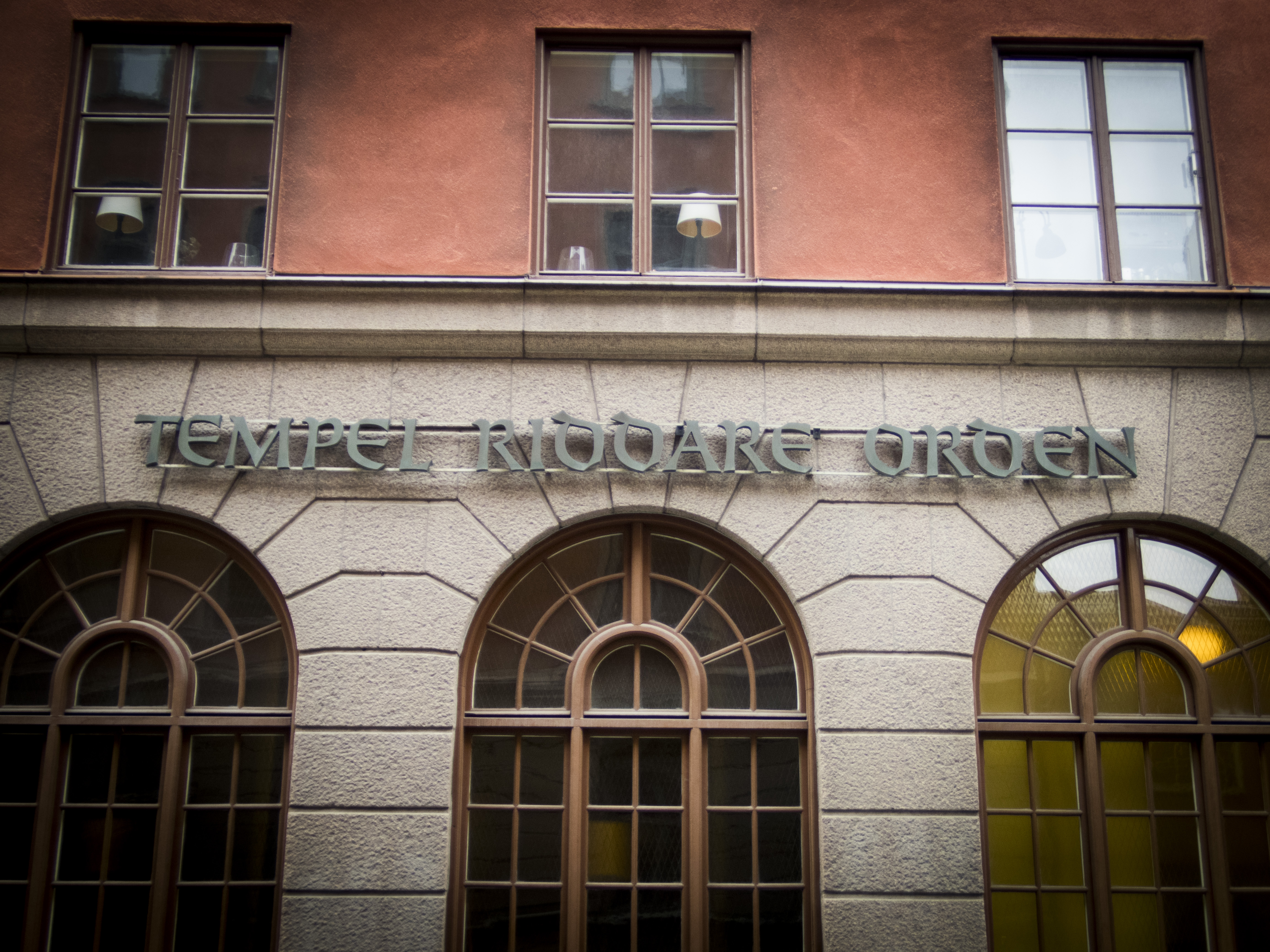
Templars of Honor and Temperance.

The Templars of Honor and Temperance, also known as the Tempel Riddare Orden, is an international fraternal order. It was founded in New York City, New York, in 1845 to promote the values of the temperance movement. The group expanded to Sweden in 1887 and is now active in Scandinavia.

== History ==
Founded as the Marshall Temperance Fraternity, the Templars of Honor and Temperance organized on June 2, 1845, in New York City, New York, as a result of a schism within the older Sons of Temperance, when some felt that the organization did not have an elaborate enough ritual. Its purpose was to promote the values of the temperance movement. The name came from the division of the Sons of Temperance that it formed from.

The new group changed its name several times, first to Marshall Temple, No. 1, Sons of Honor in November 1845, then to Marshall Temple of Honor, No. 1, Sons of Temperance on December 15, 1945. The latter's founders were John Murphy, R. T. Traill, and A. D. Wilson.

By 1846, Marshall Temple had twelve subordinate chapters in New York, one in Philadelphia, and one in Baltimore. On February 21, 1846, the National Temple of the Templars of Honor and Temperance of the United States was instituted in New York City in American Hall at Grand Street and Broadway.

In 1887, it became an international organization when a chapter was established in Sweden by a member from New York who had returned to his native country. In December 1896, its membership included 7,000 men and women in the United States (Connecticut, Illinois, Louisiana, Maine, Massachusetts, Michigan, New York, New Jersey, Ohio, Pennsylvania, Rhode Island, Texas, Wisconsin, Wyoming), Canada (New Brunswick), England, and Sweden.

The organization expanded to Denmark in 1904, followed by Norway in 1922 and the Faroe Islands in 1933. It added temples in Iceland in 1949 and Finland in 1952. Today, all U.S. chapters are inactive, but the Templars of Honor and Temperance is active in Scandinavia, where it is known as Tempel Riddare Orden ("The Order of the Knight Templars"). Approximately 119 chapters or temples are located Denmark, Faroe Islands, Finland, Iceland, Norway, and Sweden.

== Symbols and traditions ==
Templars of Honor and Temperance has a secret ritual which was based on the medieval Knights Templar, the story of Damon and Pythias as well as Jonathan and David. The ritual worked six degrees and is said to have shown Masonic influence. The group was led by a "Supreme Council" and subordinate groups included "Grand Councils" and "Great Temples".

As a secret society and fraternal organization, it has signs, hand grips, passwords, and emblems.
