= Movendi International =

Fraternal temperance organisation

- Formation: 1851; 175 years ago
- Headquarters: Stockholm, Sweden
- International President: Kristina Sperkova
- International Vice President: Pubudu Sumanasekara
- Executive Director: Esbjörn Hörnberg
- Website: movendi.ngo

Movendi International is the international body with temperance organisations in 63 countries as members. It traces its roots to the fraternal temperance organisation the Independent Order of Good Templars (IOGT; later known as the International Organisation of Good Templars) and promotes abstinence from alcohol and other drugs.

It describes itself as "the premier global interlocutor for evidence-based policy measures and community-based interventions to prevent and reduce harm caused by alcohol and other drugs." It claims to be the largest worldwide community of non-governmental organisations with a mission to independently enlighten people around the world on a lifestyle free from alcohol and other drugs.

Founded in 1851, Movendi International works to promote the avoidance of alcohol and other drugs by supporting communities and societies around the world. Its constitution say this will lead to the liberation of peoples of the world, this leading to a richer, freer and more rewarding life. The headquarters of Movendi International is in Stockholm.

== History ==
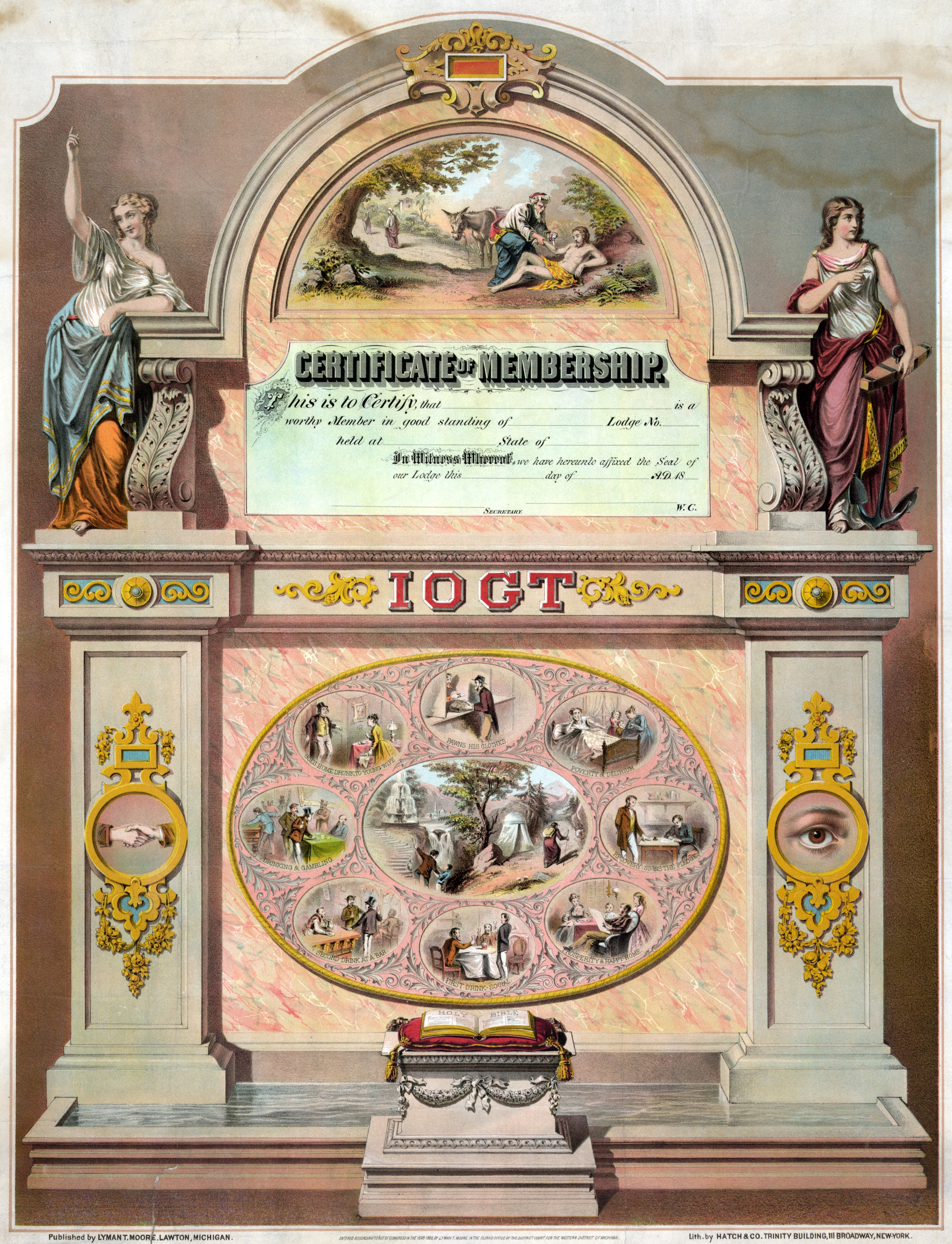
IOGT membership certificate, Michigan, 1868

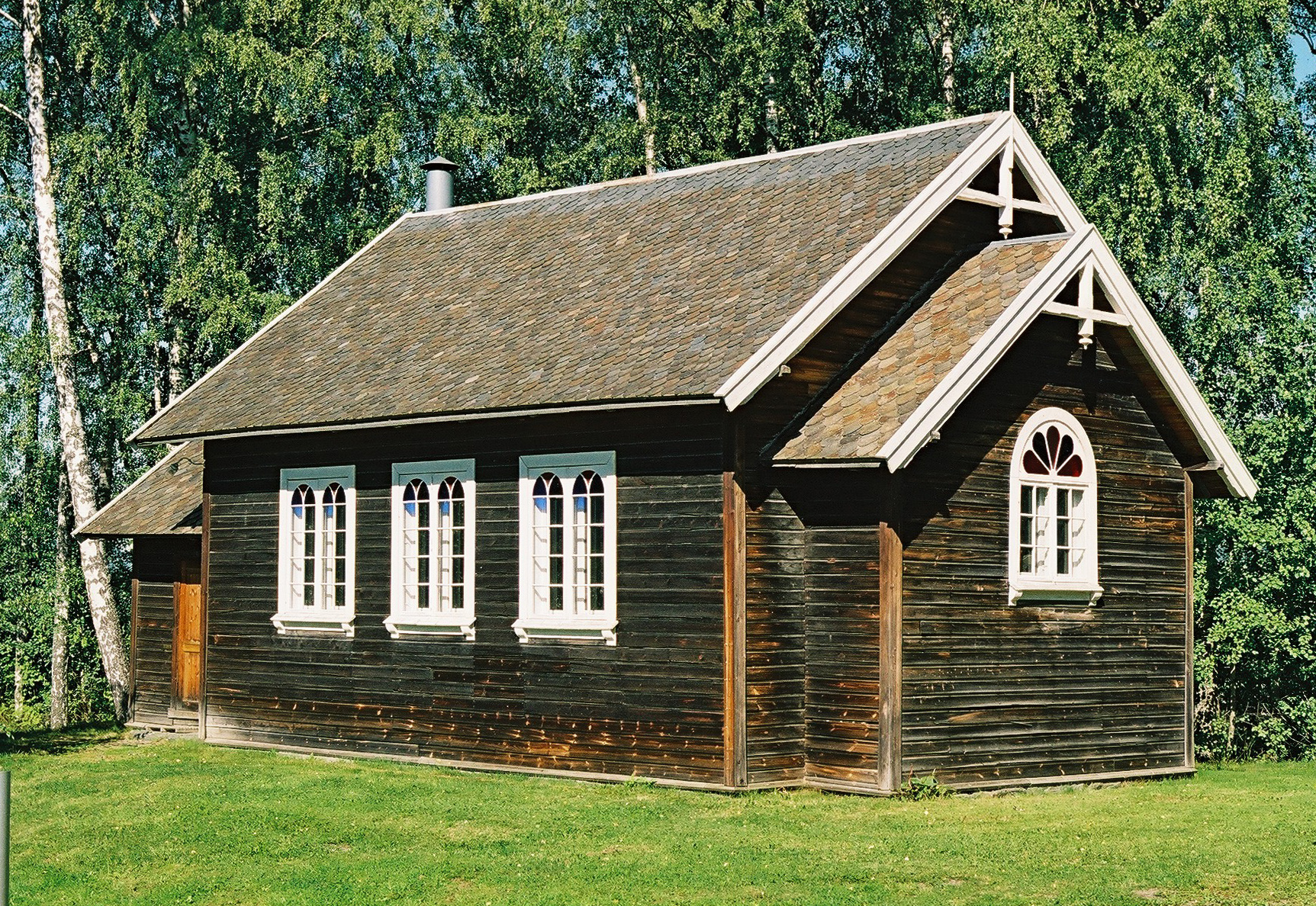
Small assembly building of the IOGT lodge in Vågå, Norway. Built 1908.

The IOGT originated as one of a number of fraternal organizations for temperance or total abstinence founded in the 19th century and with a structure modelled on Freemasonry, using similar ritual and regalia. Unlike many, however, it admitted men and women equally, and also made no distinction by race.

The IOGT named themselves after the Knights Templar, citing the legend that the original knights "drank sour milk, and also because they were fighting 'a great crusade' against 'this terrible vice' of alcohol."

In 1850, in Utica, New York, Daniel Cady founded one such organization, the Knights of Jericho. In 1851, a lodge of it in Oriskany Falls (then known as Castor Hollow), a village near Utica, was visited by 13 members of another Utica group. Under the leadership of Wesley Bailey, it was decided that these two lodges form the Order of Good Templars. The motto of the renamed organization was "Friendship, Hope and Charity."

Over the next year, 14 additional lodges were established. By the summer of 1852, a convention was called in Utica to establish a Grand Lodge. During this, a dispute broke out between Wesley Bailey and Leverett Coon, who had established a lodge, Excelsior, in Syracuse. Coon left the meeting and his lodge supported his actions by seceding as the Independent Order of Good Templars, with the motto altered to "Faith, Hope and Charity." They shortly merged back, the resulting group continuing under the name Independent Order of Good Templars.

The Order first grew rapidly in the United States and in Canada. In 1868, Joseph Malins returned to his native England and established a Birmingham lodge, from which IOGT spread to Europe and the rest of the world. Within three years the Order spread to Ireland, Wales, Australia, Malta, New Zealand, France, Portugal, South Africa, Bermuda, Belgium and East India. By 1876, it had established itself in Ceylon (Sri Lanka), Madras, British Honduras, British Guyana, Jamaica, Malacca, China, Japan, Sierra Leone, St. Helena, Argentina, Trinidad, Grenada and the Bahamas. This was followed by lodges in Norway, Sweden, Denmark, Iceland, Switzerland, Germany and Jerusalem.

From 1900 onward, further groups were set up in the Netherlands, Burma, Nigeria and Panama. In 1906, reflecting the International reach of the organisation the word "Independent" in its title, was replaced by "International."

From its inception, the Independent Order of Good Templars "campaigned for prohibition, strove to provide social facilities that served non-alcoholic beverages, promoted education and self-help, and supported decent working conditions for working people."

In an attempt to modernize its image, the IOGT changed some of its titles and ritualistic features in the 1970s; the use of regalia and rituals began to diminish or were eliminated. In 1970, instead of "Order," the group became the International Organisation of Good Templars. The title of "Chief Templar" was changed to "President" and local units were given the option of calling themselves "Chapters" rather than "Lodges." Instead of three degrees, only one, the Justice degree, was worked by 1979, and the ritual is no longer secret.

== Membership ==
In 1875, after the American Civil War, the American senior body voted to allow separate lodges and Grand Lodges for white and black members, to accommodate the practice of racial segregation in southern US states. In 1876, Malins and other British members failed in achieving an amendment to stop this, and left to establish a separate international body. In 1887 this and the American body were reconciled into a single IOGT.

Women were admitted as regular members early in the history of the Good Templar. In 1979, there were 700,000 members internationally, though only 2,000 in the country of the IOGTs origin, the United States.

== Juvenile Templars ==
In the mid 1870s, Juvenile Templars, or Cold Water Temples (C.W.T), were established. An 1874 Journal of Proceedings report provided information that Cold Water Temples, or organizations very similar to them, existed in 24 Grand Lodge jurisdictions in Alabama, Canada, California, Colorado, Connecticut, England, Georgia, Illinois, Maine, Massachusetts, Michigan, Minnesota, North Carolina, New Hampshire, New Jersey, Nova Scotia, Ohio, Pennsylvania, Scotland, South Carolina, Texas, Vermont, Wisconsin, and Wales. A similar organization existed in Australia and Ireland. The children's organization in all of the British Grand Lodge jurisdictions—under the name of Juvenile Temples—was very similar to the C.W.T. It was worked successfully, but independently of R. W. G. L. In Alabama, Colorado, Connecticut, Illinois, Massachusetts, Michigan, Minnesota, North Carolina, New Hampshire, New Jersey, Nova Scotia, Ohio, South Carolina, Texas, and Vermont, it had not much more than a nominal existence.

In 1873, Martha B. O'Donnell was appointed Convener of a Committee on Juvenile Work and elected Chief Superintendent of Juvenile Templars, holding this position until 1878, when she declined re-election.

From 1990 to 2017, in Europe, it had a youth division, "ACTIVE – sobriety, friendship, peace." Since then, youth organizations being member of IOGT International, form the group "IOGT Youth."

== Notable people ==
- Arthur Arntzen (1906–1997), Norwegian civil servant and politician
- Emily Rose Bleby (1849–1917), Jamaican-born social reformer active in the British temperance movement
- Chauncey Boughton (1805–1895), American physician and politician
- Sara J. Dorr (1855–1924), American temperance reformer
- Ingrid Espelid Hovig (1924–2018) was a Norwegian television chef and cookbook author
- William Finlayson (Australian politician) (1867–1955), Australian politician
- Isak Larsson Flatabø (1896–1969), Norwegian politician
- Jessie Forsyth (1847/49–1937), British-American temperance advocate
- Omar Gjesteby (1899–1979), Norwegian trade unionist and politician
- Harriet Newell Kneeland Goff (1828–1901), American temperance reformer and author
- Charlotte A. Gray (1844–1912), English educator and temperance missionary
- Nils Hjelmtveit (1892–1985), Norwegian educator and politician
- Ólafía Jóhannsdóttir (1863–1924), Icelandic teacher and temperance worker
- Thorleif Karlsen (1909–2010), Norwegian police inspector and politician
- Helen Kirk (1827–1895), Scottish reformer, temperance worker, editor, writer
- Georg Kropp (1865–1943), German journalist and polymath
- Eugenia St. John Mann (1847–1932), American clergy, evangelist, temperance lecturer, and suffragist
- William McGonagall (1825–1902), Scottish poet
- Sarah Galt Elwood McKee (1842–1934), Canadian social reformer and temperance leader
- Martha B. O'Donnell (1836–1925), American temperance activist
- Ulrik Olsen (1885–1963), Norwegian politician
- Margaret Eleanor Parker (1827–1896), British activist, social reformer, and travel writer
- Emilie Rathou (1862–1948), Swedish journalist, newspaper editor and elected official
- Ellen Sergeant Rude (1838–1916), American author, poet, and temperance advocate
- Sue A. Sanders (1842–1931), American teacher, clubwoman, and author
- Bjørn Skau (1929–2013), Norwegian politician
- John Sobieski (U.S. Colonel) (1842–1927), Polish-born American soldier, attorney, and politician
- August Spångberg (1893–1987), Swedish member of parliament
- Katie Stuart (reformer) (1862–1925), South African evangelist and temperance leader
- Delia L. Weatherby (1843–1916), American temperance reformer and author
- Minnie Welch (1871–1962), American temperance reformer, executive

== See also ==
- IOGT-NTO, the Swedish branch
- List of Temperance organizations
