= Temperance movement in the United States =

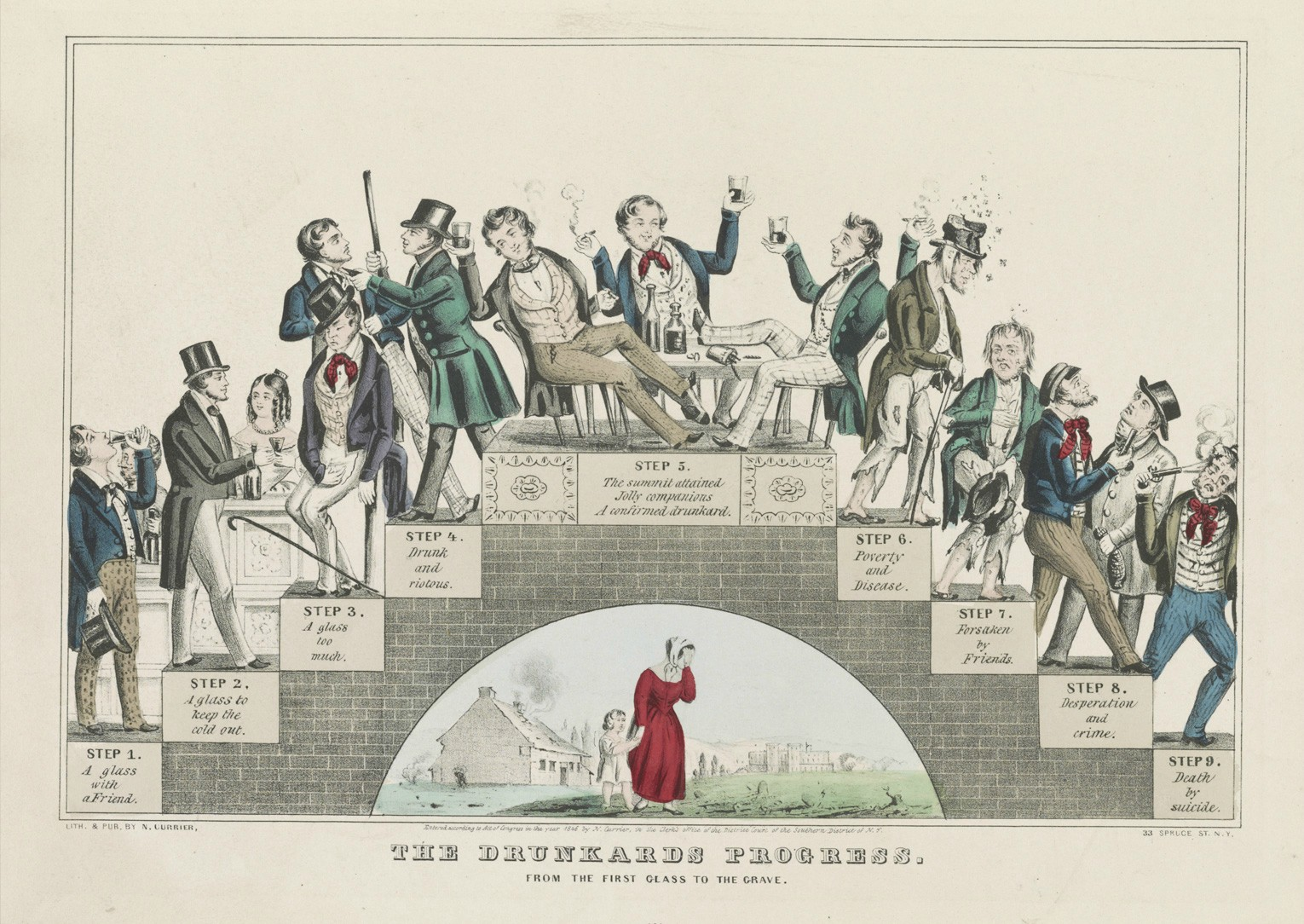
The Drunkard's Progress: A lithograph by Nathaniel Currier supporting the temperance movement, January 1846.

The temperance movement in the United States, which sought to curb the consumption of alcohol, had a large influence on American politics and American society in the nineteenth and twentieth centuries, culminating in the prohibition of alcohol, through the Eighteenth Amendment to the United States Constitution, from 1920 to 1933. Today, there are organizations that continue to promote the cause of temperance.

== Early temperance: 1784–1861 ==
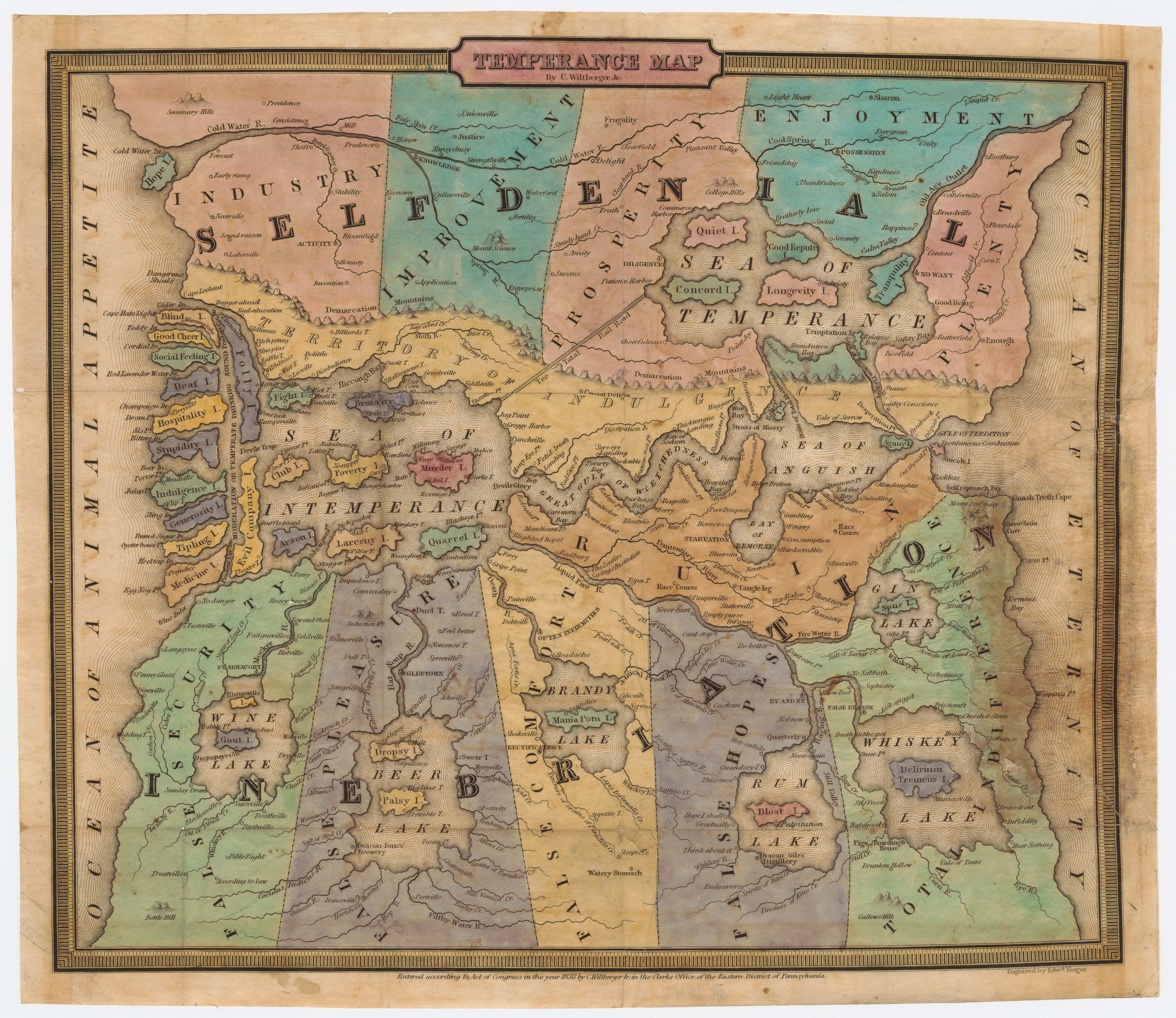
An early allegorical map of temperance by John C. Wiltberger, Jr., 1838.

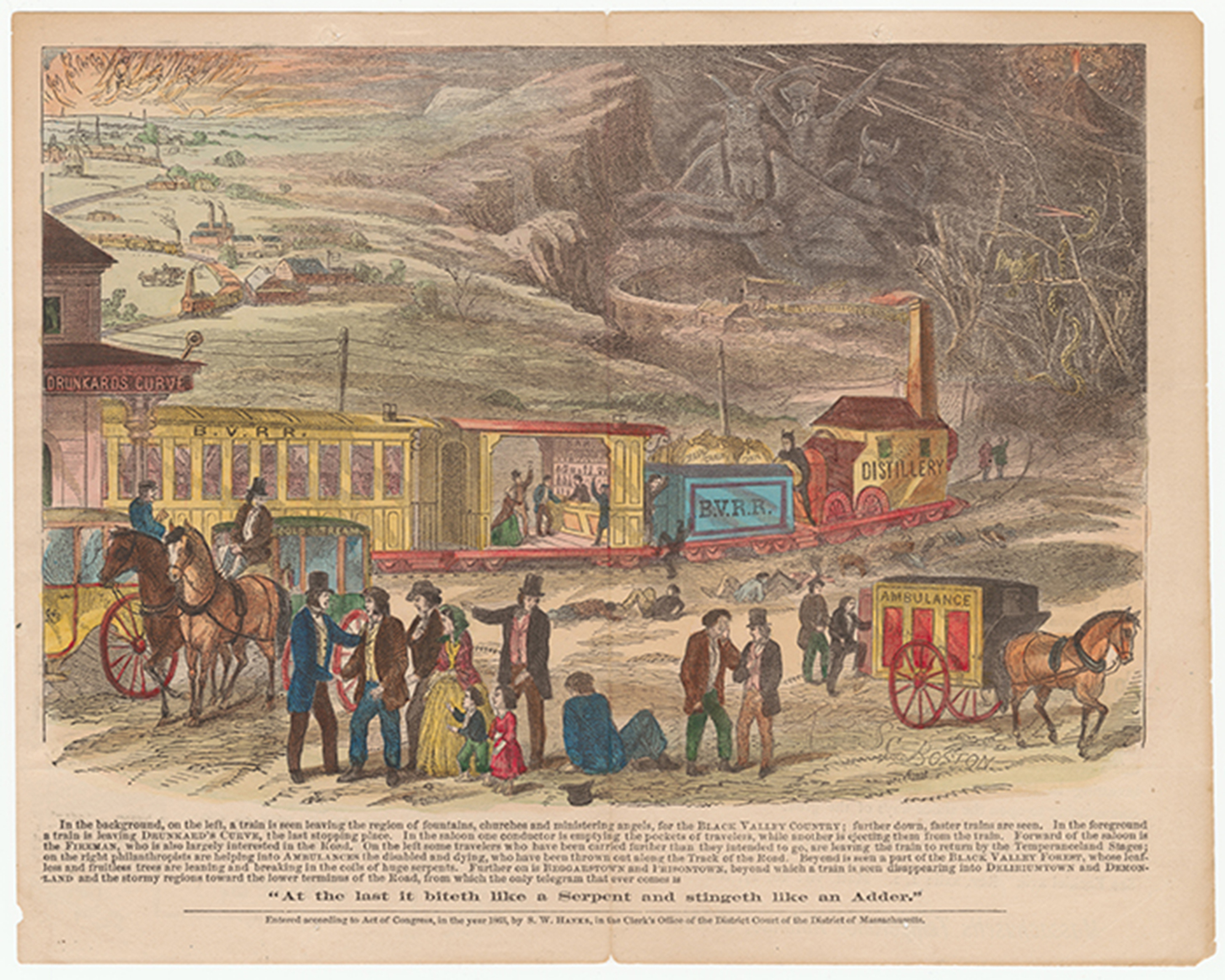
An allegorical map on temperance, based on the notion of alcohol as a train ride to destruction, the "Black Valley Rail Road" by the Massachusetts Temperance Alliance, 1863.

In the late eighteenth and early nineteenth century, various factors contributed to an epidemic of alcoholism that went hand-in-hand with spousal abuse, family neglect, and chronic unemployment. Americans who used to drink lightly alcoholic beverages, like cider "from the crack of dawn to the crack of dawn" began ingesting far more alcohol as they drank more of strong, cheap beverages like rum (in the colonial period) and whiskey (in the post-Revolutionary period). Popular pressure for cheap and plentiful alcohol led to relaxed ordinances on alcohol sales.

The temperance movement was born with Benjamin Rush's 1784 tract, An Inquiry Into the Effects of Ardent Spirits Upon the Human Body and Mind, which judged the excessive use of alcohol injurious to physical and psychological health. Influenced by Rush's Inquiry, about 200 farmers in a Connecticut community formed a temperance association in 1789 to ban the making of whiskey. Similar associations were formed in Virginia in 1800, and New York State in 1808. Over the next decade, other temperance organizations were formed in eight states, some being statewide organizations. The young movement allowed for temperate or moderate drinking. Many leaders of the movement expanded their activities and took positions on observance of the Sabbath and other moral issues, and by the early 1820s political in-fighting had stalled the movement.

Some leaders persevered in pressing their cause forward. Americans such as Lyman Beecher, who was a Connecticut minister, had started to lecture their fellow citizens against all use of liquor in 1825. The American Temperance Society was formed in 1826 and benefited from a renewed interest in religion and morality. Within 12 years it claimed more than 8,000 local groups and over 1,250,000 members. By 1839, 18 temperance journals were being published. Simultaneously, some Protestant and Catholic church leaders were beginning to promote temperance. The movement split along two lines in the late 1830s: between moderates allowing some drinking and radicals demanding total abstinence, and between voluntarists relying on moral suasion alone and prohibitionists promoting laws to restrict or ban alcohol. Radicals and prohibitionists dominated many of the largest temperance organizations after the 1830s, and temperance eventually became synonymous with prohibition. In 1838, temperance activists pushed the Massachusetts legislature to pass a law restricting the sale of alcohol in quantities less than fifteen gallons. In the 1840s, numerous states passed laws allowing local voters to determine whether or not liquor licences would be issued in their towns or counties. In the 1850s, 13 states and territories passed statewide prohibitory laws (known as "Maine Laws"). Throughout this period, temperance reformers also tended to support Sunday laws that restricted the sale of alcohol on Sundays.

=== Temperance During Civil War ===
The American Civil War dealt the movement a crippling blow. Temperance groups in the South were then weaker than their Northern counterparts and did not pass any statewide prohibition laws, and the few prohibition laws in the North were repealed by the war's end. Both sides in the war made alcohol sales a part of the war effort by taxing brewers and distillers to finance much of the conflict. The issue of slavery crowded out temperance and temperance groups petered out until they found new life in the 1870s.

During the American Civil War, concerns over alcohol consumption grew and contributed to the temperance movement. Whiskey was widely distributed to soldiers as a "stimulant," but its use often led to drunkenness, insubordination, and disciplinary problems. Some officers prohibited alcohol in their camps, noting improved order and health among their soldiers, while camps without restrictions reported higher rates of disorder.

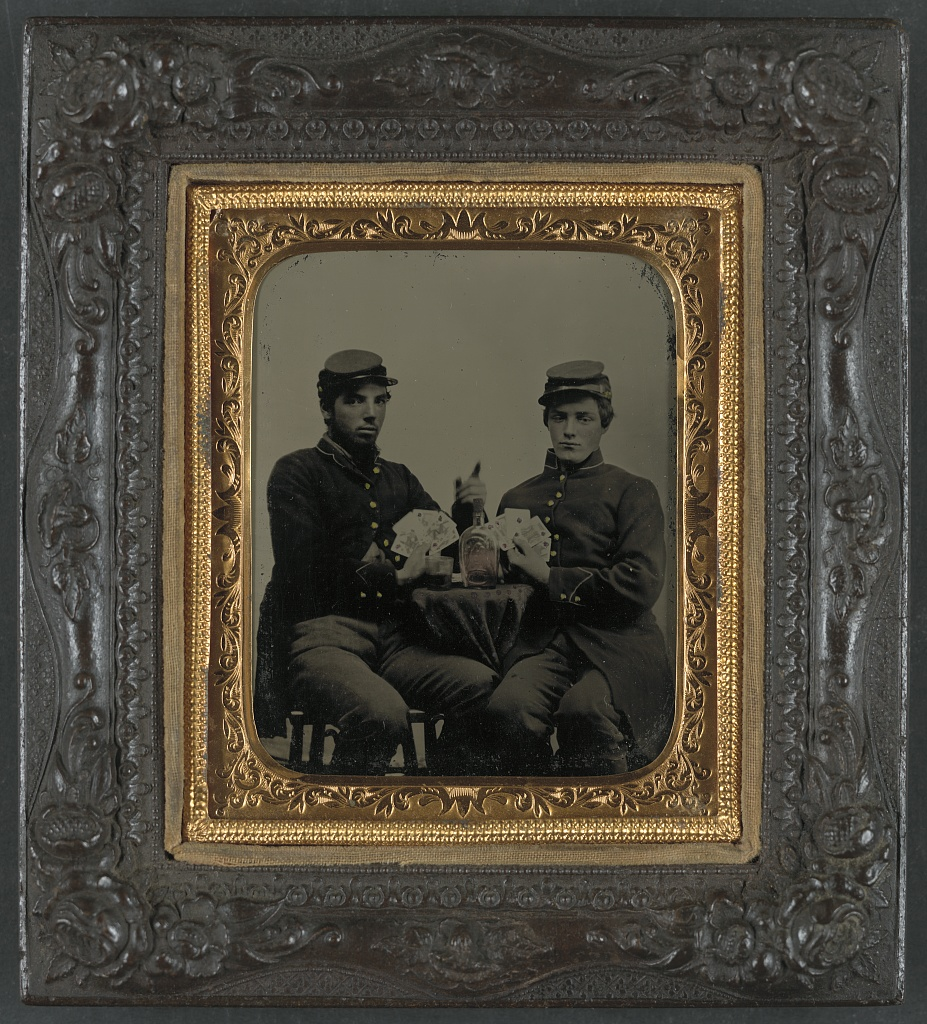
Soldiers drinking whiskey and playing cards

The temperance movement influenced soldiers by discouraging them from even considering drinking. One soldier, raised in a prohibition-supporting town, reportedly poured his whiskey ration on the ground rather than consume it. Disorder and disobedience helped turn temperance into a defining trait of honorable, disciplined service: in one example, a soldier, in a drunken fit, shot a major and was later executed, his intoxication claiming two lives outside of battle. Critics often blamed both drunkenness and those who sold liquor to soldiers, describing alcohol merchants as undermining the nation. By the end of the war, these concerns had strengthened the reemergence of the temperance movement, as many Americans increasingly questioned alcohol's role in both the military and society.

=== Early victories in Maine ===
Maine was an early hotbed of the temperance movement. The world's first Total Abstinence Society was formed in Portland in 1815, and a statewide temperance group formed in 1834. These groups won a major victory in 1838 when they pressured the state legislature to pass the Fifteen Gallon Law, which prohibited the sale of spirits in quantities of less than that amount. Its practical effect was to make hard liquor available to the wealthy, who were the only ones who could afford such quantities. It was repealed within two years. However, in 1851 the so-called Maine law passed, which banned the production and sale of alcoholic beverages. Thus Maine became the first "dry" state. However, the law's exception for "medicinal, mechanical and manufacturing purposes" meant that liquor was still available for some.

== Second Wave Temperance: 1872–1893 ==
As Reconstruction came to a close in the 1870s, many white reformers grew uninterested in racial equality and invested more energy into temperance. This period produced various temperance organizations including the prohibitionist Woman's Christian Temperance Union (WCTU, f. 1874) and the voluntarist Catholic Total Abstinence Union of America (CTAU, f. 1872). Prohibitionist temperance grew popular in the South as it embraced the "Southern" values of racial hierarchy, gender roles, and honor. The national movement enlisted more religious support throughout the country, especially from evangelicals.

=== Temperance education ===
In 1873, the WCTU established a Department of Scientific Temperance Instruction in Schools and Colleges, with Mary Hunt as National Superintendent. The WCTU was an influential organization with a membership of 120,000 by 1879. Frances Willard led the group under the motto "Do Everything" to protect women and children. Some of the changes the WCTU sought included property and custody rights for women, women's suffrage, raising the age of consensual sex, peace arbitration, women's education, and advocacy for working rights of women.

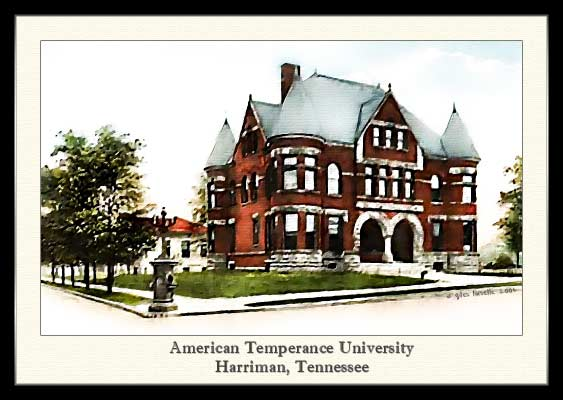
Postcard depicting Temperance Hall

Because of the correlation between drinking and domestic violence—many drunken husbands abused family members—the temperance movement existed alongside various women's rights and other movements, including the Progressive movement, and often the same activists were involved in multiple movements. Many notable voices of the time, ranging from Lucy Webb Hayes to Susan B. Anthony, were active in temperance. In Canada, Nellie McClung was a longstanding advocate of temperance. As with most social movements, there was a gamut of activists running from violent (Carrie Nation) to mild (Neal S. Dow).

The American Temperance University opened in 1893 in the planned town of Harriman, Tennessee, which was developed as a community with no alcoholic beverages permitted. In its second year of operation the institution enrolled 345 students from 20 states. However, it closed in 1908.

=== Temperance fountains ===
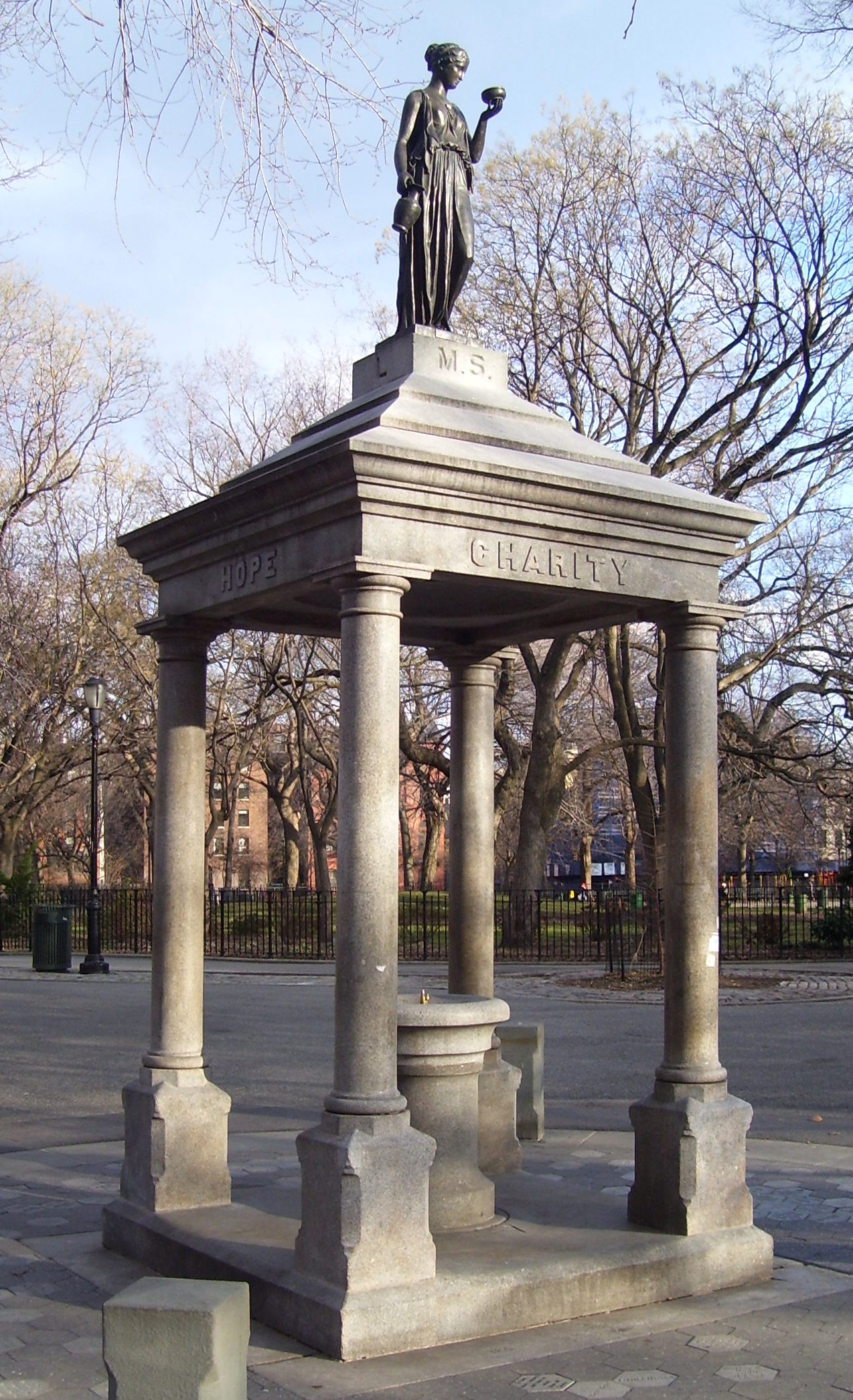
A temperance fountain in Tompkins Square Park, New York City

Sickening and ill-tasting drinking water encouraged many Americans to drink alcohol for health purposes, so temperance groups constructed public drinking fountains throughout the United States following the Civil War. The National Woman's Christian Temperance Union (NWCTU)'s organizing convention of 1874 strongly encouraged its attendees to erect the fountains in the places that they had come from. The NWCTU advocated public temperance fountains as a means to discourage males from entering drinking establishment for refreshment.

Cast-stone statues of Hebe were marketed for use in temperance fountains. In Union Square Park (New York City) the James Fountain (1881), is a Temperance fountain with the figure of Charity who empties her jug of water, aided by a child; it was donated by Daniel Willis James and sculpted by Adolf Donndorf. In Washington DC "the" Temperance Fountain was donated to the city in 1882 by Temperance crusader Henry D. Cogswell. This fountain was one of a series of fountains he designed and commissioned in a belief that easy access to cool drinking water would keep people from consuming alcohol. Under its stone canopy the words "Faith," "Hope," "Charity," and "Temperance" are chiseled. Atop this canopy is a life-sized heron, and the centerpiece is a pair of entwined heraldic scaly dolphins. Originally, visitors were supposed to freely drink ice water flowing from the dolphins' snouts with a brass cup attached to the fountain and the overflow was collected by a trough for horses, but the city tired of having to replenish the ice in a reservoir underneath the base and disconnected the supply pipes. Other Cogswell fountains include one still standing in New York City's Tompkins Square Park.

Simon Benson, an Oregon lumberman, was a tee-totaler who wanted to discourage his workers from drinking alcohol in the middle of the day. In 1912, Benson gave the City of Portland US$10,000 for the installation of twenty bronze drinking fountains. As of May 2012, these fountains, known as "Benson Bubblers", continue to be used as functional public drinking devices in downtown Portland; two Portland "Benson Bubbler" locations are Eastbank Esplanade and the corner of "3rd and Burnside".

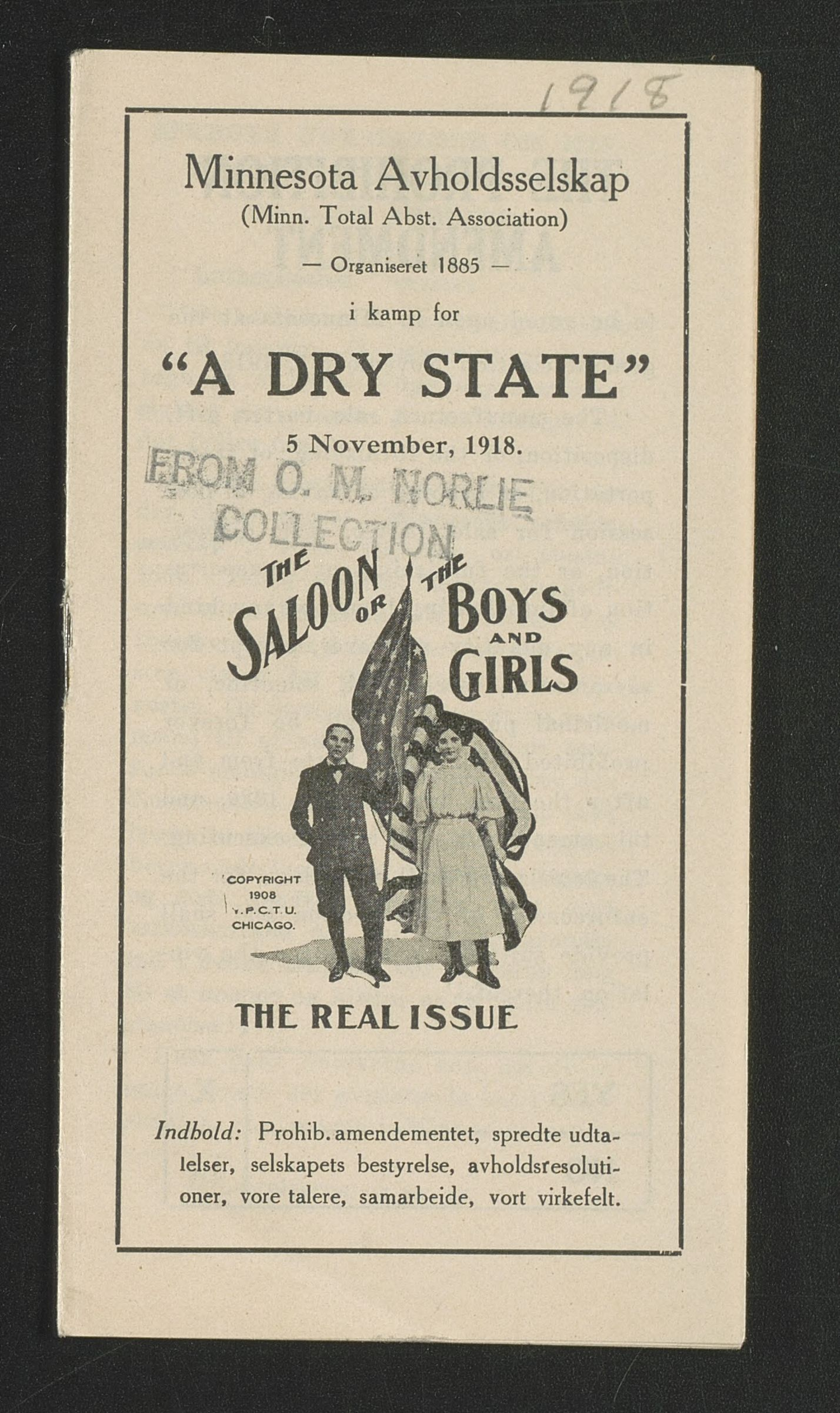
Pamphlet from the Minnesota Total Abstinence Society promoting a dry state, 1918.

== Third wave temperance: 1893–1933 ==
The defeat of Mormon polygamy in 1890 left only one of the great moral causes of the 19th century unaddressed. The last wave of temperance in the United States saw the rise of the Anti-Saloon League (ASL), which successfully pushed for National Prohibition from its enactment in 1920 to its repeal in 1933. This heavily prohibitionist wave attracted a diverse coalition: doctors, pastors, and eugenicists; Klansmen and liberal internationalists; business leaders and labor radicals; conservative evangelicals and liberal theologians. It breathed new life into temperance activism by pressing for a ban on alcohol sale precinct by precinct and, thenceforth, across the country. It steered away from parties and did content itself with the passage of some local laws.

=== Anti-Saloon League ===
Rev. Howard Hyde Russell founded the Anti-Saloon League (ASL) in 1893. Under the leadership of Wayne Wheeler the ASL stressed political results and perfected the art of pressure politics. It did not demand that politicians change their drinking habits, only their votes in the legislature. Other organizations like the Prohibition Party and the WCTU soon lost influence to the better-organized and more focused ASL.

The ASL's motto was "the saloon must go", and it mobilized its religious coalition to pass state (and local) legislation (establishing dry states and dry counties).

By the late nineteenth century, most Protestant denominations and the American wing of the Catholic Church supported the movement to legally restrict the sale and consumption of alcoholic beverages. These groups believed that alcohol consumption led to corruption, prostitution, spousal abuse, and other criminal activities. Brewers and distillers resisted the reform movement, which threatened to ruin their livelihoods, and also feared women having the vote, because they expected women to vote for prohibition.

Energized by the anti-German sentiment during World War I, the ASL achieved its main goal of passage on December 18, 1917—the 18th Amendment. Upon ratification by three-fourths of the state legislatures by January 16, 1919, established National Prohibition. The Amendment took effect on January 16, 1920. Prohibition banned "the manufacture, sale, and transportation of alcoholic beverages in the United States and its possessions." However, Prohibition did not outlaw the private possession or consumption of alcohol products.

== Modern temperance: Post–World War II ==
Harvard Medical School professors Jack Harold Mendelson and Nancy K. Mello write, with regard to temperance sentiment in contemporary America, that "rallying cries once structured in terms of social order, home and basic decency are now framed in terms of health promotion and disease prevention." Original temperance organizations such as the Woman's Christian Temperance Union and International Organization of Good Templars continue their work today, while new "temperance enterprises found support in a variety of institutional venues" such as the Marin Institute for the Prevention of Alcohol and Other Drug Problems and Center for Science in the Public Interest. These temperance organizations focus their efforts on "promoting increased taxation, reducing alcohol advertising, and monitoring of the beverage industry", as well as the supporting of Sunday blue laws, which prohibit the sale of alcohol on Sundays.

== Temperance media ==
Paul D. Sanders finds two methods by which the temperance movement stoked reform: moral suasion, which "appealed to the emotion and intellect of the drinker when arguing the case for abstinence"; and coercion, "focused instead on laws and force to eliminate the alcohol problem".

=== Temperance theatre ===
Temperance birthed an entire genre of theatre. In 1825, a dramatic poem called The Forgers premiered at the Charleston Theatre in Charleston, South Carolina. The next significant temperance drama to debut was titled Fifteen Years of a Drunkard's Life, written by Douglas Jerrold in 1841. As the movement began to grow and prosper, these dramas became more popular among the general public. The Drunkard by W.H. Smith premiered in 1841 in Boston, running for 144 performances before being produced at Barnum's American Museum on lower Broadway. The play was wildly popular and is often credited with the entrance of the temperance narrative into mainstream American theatre. It continued to be a staple of New York's theatre scene all the way until 1875. The Drunkard follows the typical format of a temperance drama: the main character has an alcohol-induced downfall, and he restores his life from disarray once he denounces drinking for good at the play's end. Temperance drama continued to grow as a genre of theatre, fostered by the advent of the railroad as a form of transportation. This enabled theatre companies to be much more mobile, traveling from city to city. Temperance drama would even reach as far as the West Coast, as David Belasco's adaptation of Émile Zola's novel Drink premiered at the Baldwin Theatre in San Francisco in 1879.

=== Temperance music ===
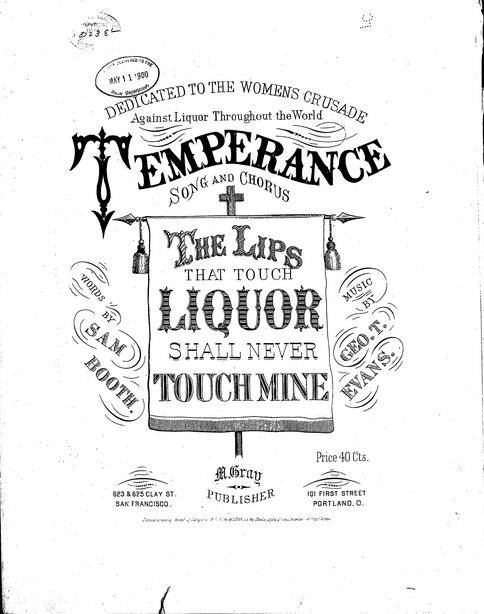
Sheet music cover of Sam Booth and George T. Evans's "The Lips That Touch Liquor Shall Never Touch Mine"

Reform literature was a main medium through which their message was spread among the masses, often taking the form of plain, lucid, and sentimental lyrics. Ewing notes: "Many, if not most, of the hymnbooks of the late nineteenth and early twentieth centuries contain at least two or three temperance hymns." Drunkards were framed as sinful and guilty of the degeneration of lives throughout the country; they shook stable families. Poetry and music themed on temperance began to catch on around 1830, much in line with the swellling influence of the movement as a whole. After the Eighteenth Amendment's passage, temperance meetings were largely no longer needed, and songs turned towards the newly-found fortunes of speakeasies and smugglers. The amendment's repeal thirteen years later extinguished temperance verse. As Ewing writes:

People born since that date either are totally unfamiliar with temperance songs and poems or have heard only a few of the more throat-catching ones (like "Father, dear father, come home with me now") irreverently sung to divert rather than convert.

The most famous temperance song, at least according to The New Grove Dictionary and Annemarie McAllister, was Henry Clay Work's "Come Home, Father", published in 1864. It is a sentimental tale told by Mary, a young girl who exhorts her drunken father to return home from the tavern while her brother Benny slowly dies. As writes George Birdseye (1879), it was "the pioneer and pattern for all the many temperance pieces now in the market, not a few of which are very palpable imitations". Jon W. Finson names Susan Parkhurst's "Father's a Drunkard and Mother Is Dead" (1868) as an example, which boasts the line: "Dark is the night, and the storm rages wild, / God pity Bessie, the drunkard's lone child". Moreover, he argues that the forceful rift between woman and man as presented in "Come Home, Father", and in many other songs of the time, left an impression; women were made into undefiled beings safely secured in their homes, and men became devils who wrought harm with their public manner. The individually-minded temperance song eventually fell out of style. At the turn of the twentieth century, songs extolling gathered, collective struggle towards prohibition and rally songs began to supersede the old standards. The Women's Christian Temperance Union stopped printing "Come Home, Father" and other compositions about "the ills of drunkness" or "tears-and-terror poems" in its Union Signal by 1932.

== Temperance organizations ==
Temperance organizations of the United States played an essential role in bringing about ratification of the Eighteenth Amendment of the United States Constitution establishing national prohibition of alcohol. Some temperance organizations in the United States include:

- The American Issue Publishing House
- The American Temperance Society
- The Anti-Saloon League (active)
- The British Women's Temperance Association (active)
- The Catholic Total Abstinence Union of America
- The Center for Science in the Public Interest (active)
- The Committee of Fifty (1893)
- The Daughters of Temperance
- The Department of Scientific Temperance Instruction
- The Flying Squadron of America
- The IOGT-USA (active)
- The Knights of Father Matthew
- The Lincoln-Lee Legion
- The Marin Institute for the Prevention of Alcohol and Other Drug Problems (active)
- The Methodist Board of Temperance, Prohibition, and Public Morals
- The National Temperance Society and Publishing House
- The Pioneer Total Abstinence Association (active)
- The Prohibition Party (active)
- The Salvation Army (active)
- The Scientific Temperance Federation
- The Sons of Temperance (active)
- The Templars of Honor and Temperance (active)
- The Abstinence Society
- The Total Abstinence Society, formed in Portland, Maine in 1815.
- The Woman's Christian Temperance Union (active)
- The Woman's New York State Temperance Society, founded in 1852 by Susan B. Anthony and Mary C. Vaughn
- The National Temperance Council
- The World League Against Alcoholism (a pro-prohibition organization)

There was often considerable overlap in membership in these organizations, as well as in leadership. Prominent temperance leaders in the United States included Bishop James Cannon, Jr., James Black, Ernest Cherrington, Neal S. Dow, Mary Hunt, William E. Johnson (known as "Pussyfoot" Johnson), Carrie Nation, Howard Hyde Russell, John St. John, Billy Sunday, Father Mathew, Andrew Volstead and Wayne Wheeler.

There were also commercial establishments, such as the Glenwood Inn (Hornellsville, New York), that made a point of selling no alcohol so as to attract families.

== See also ==
- Prohibition in the United States – Ban on alcohol from 1920 to 1933
- List of dry states
- Anti-Cigarette League of America
- Daisy Douglas Barr – American extremist minister and racist
- Diocletian Lewis – American physician
- Edith Smith Davis
- Eliza Thompson – American temperance activist (1816–1905)
- Frances E. L. Preston – African-American activist (1844–1929)
- Gene Amondson – American painter and politician
- The Hallelujah Trail – 1965 film by John Sturges
- "Let Every Man Mind His Own Business" (short story)
- Mary Hunt – American temperance activist (1830–1906)
- Native American temperance activists – Native Americans dedicated to preventing alcohol abuse
- Purley Baker
- Straight Edge – Subculture of hardcore punk
- Temperance and Good Citizenship Day
- Thomas Sewall – American physician (1786–1845)
- Washington movement – 19th-century temperance movement in the United States

== General and cited references ==
- Cherrington, Ernest. Evolution of Prohibition in the United States (1926).
- Clark, Norman H. Deliver Us From Evil: An Interpretation of American Prohibition. W. W. Norton, 1976.
- Dannenbaum, Jed. "The Origins of Temperance Activism and Militancy among American Women", Journal of Social History vol. 14 (1981): 235–36.
- Gusfield, Joseph R. Symbolic Crusade: Status Politics and the American Temperance Movement. Urbana, IL: University of Illinois Press, 1963.
- Jensen, Richard. The Winning of the Midwest, Social and Political Conflict, 1888–1896. Chicago, IL: University of Chicago Press, 1971.
- McConnell, D. W. Temperance Movements. In: Seligman, Edwin R. A., and Johnson, Alvin (eds.) Encyclopedia of the Social Sciences, 1933.
- Meyer, Sabine N. We Are What We Drink: The Temperance Battle in Minnesota. Champaign, IL: University of Illinois Press, 2015.
- Odegard, Peter H. Pressure Politics: The Story of the Anti-Saloon League. 1928.
- Sheehan, Nancy M. The WCTU and education: Canadian-American illustrations. Journal of the Midwest History of Education Society, 1981, P, 115–133.
- Timberlake, James H. Prohibition and the Progressive Movement, 1900–1920. Cambridge, MA: Harvard University Press, 1963.
- Tracy, Sarah W. and Caroline Jean Acker; Altering American Consciousness: The History of Alcohol and Drug Use in the United States, 1800–2000. Amherst, MA: University of Massachusetts Press, 2004.
- Tyrrell, Ian. Woman's World/Woman's Empire: The Woman's Christian Temperance Union in International Perspective, 1880–1930. Chapel Hill, NC: University of North Carolina Press, 1991.
- Volk, Kyle G. Moral Minorities and the Making of American Democracy. New York: Oxford University Press, 2014.
