= Reformism (historical) =

Type of social movement

Reformism is a type of social movement that aims to bring a social or also a political system closer to the community's ideal. A reform movement is distinguished from more radical social movements such as revolutionary movements which reject those old ideals, in that the ideas are often grounded in liberalism, although they may be rooted in socialist (specifically, social democratic) or religious concepts. Some rely on personal transformation; others rely on small collectives, such as Mahatma Gandhi's spinning wheel and the self-sustaining village economy, as a mode of social change. Reactionary movements, which can arise against any of these, attempt to put things back the way they were before any successes the new reform movement(s) enjoyed, or to prevent any such successes.

== United Kingdom ==
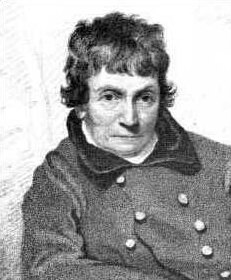
John Cartwright, known as the "Father of Reform"

After two decades of intensely conservative rule, the logjam broke in the late 1820s with the repeal of obsolete restrictions on Nonconformists, followed by the dramatic removal of severe limitations on Catholics in Britain.

The Radical movement campaigned for electoral reform, against child labour, for a reform of the Poor Laws, free trade, educational reform, prison reform, and public sanitation. Originally this movement sought to replace the exclusive political power of the aristocracy with a more democratic system empowering urban areas and the middle and working classes. The energy of reform emerged from the religious fervour of the evangelical element in the established Church of England, and Evangelical workers in the Nonconformist churches, especially the Methodists.

Reformers also used the scientific methodology of Jeremy Bentham and the utilitarians to design specific reforms, and especially to provide for government inspection to guarantee their successful operation. The greatest success of the Reformers was the Reform Act 1832. It gave the rising urban middle classes more political power, while sharply reducing the power of the low-population districts controlled by rich families. Despite determined resistance from the House of Lords to the bill, this act gave more parliamentary power to the liberals, while reducing the political force of the working class, leaving them detached from the main body of middle class support on which they had relied. Having achieved the Reform Act 1832, the Radical alliance was broken until the Liberal-Labour alliance of the Edwardian period.

=== Chartist movement ===
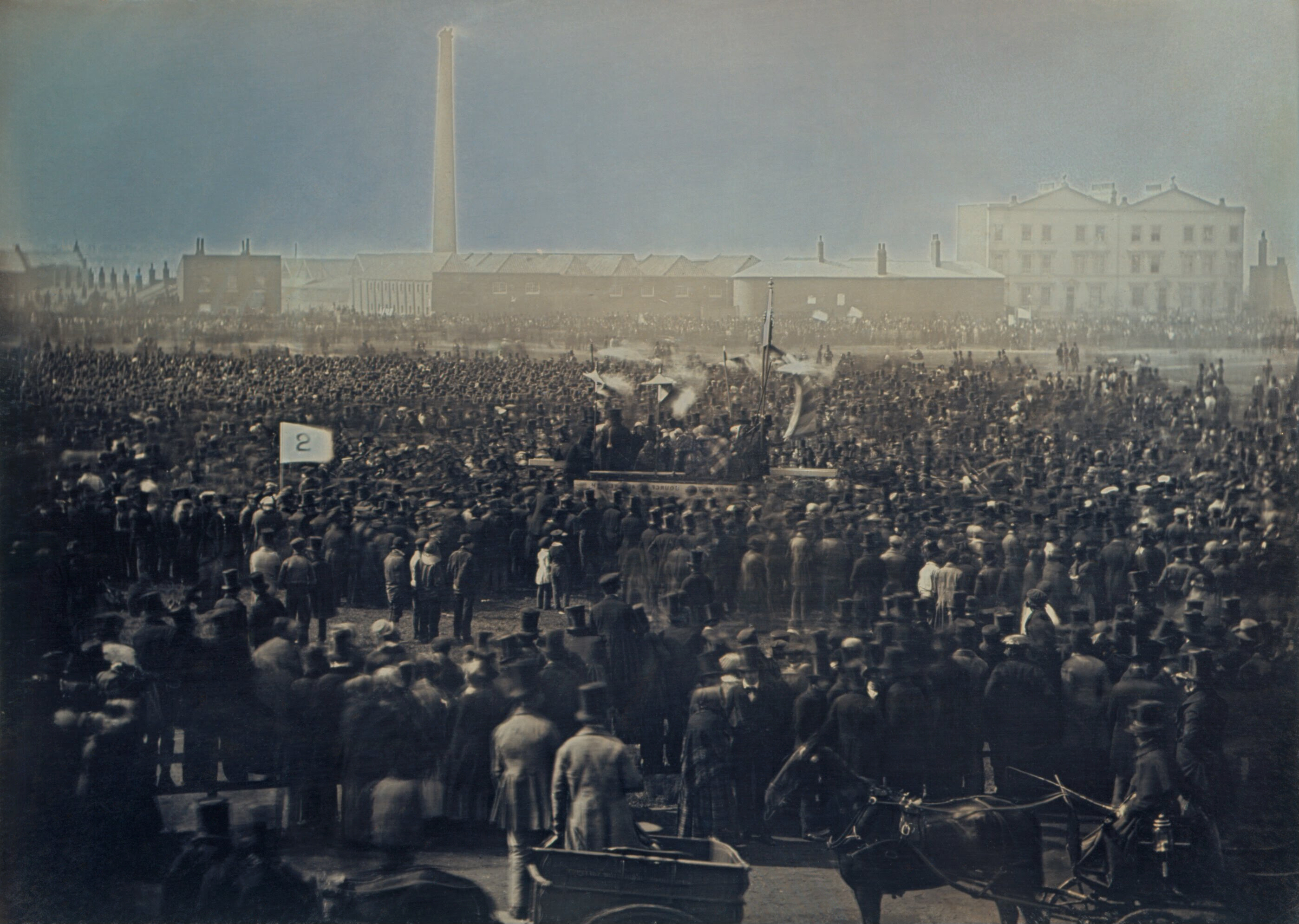
Chartist meeting, Kennington Common, 1848

The Chartist movement in nineteenth-century Britain sought universal suffrage (initially universal male suffrage). A historian of the Chartist movement observed that "The Chartist movement was essentially an economic movement with a purely political programme." A period of bad trade and high food prices set in, and the drastic restrictions on Poor Law relief were a source of acute distress. The London Working Men's Association, under the guidance of Francis Place, found itself in the midst of a great unrest. In the northern textile districts the Chartists, led by Feargus O'Connor, a follower of Daniel O'Connell, denounced the inadequate Poor Laws. This was basically a hunger revolt, springing from unemployment and despair. In Birmingham, the older Birmingham Political Union sprang to life under the leadership of Thomas Attwood. The Chartist movement demanded basic economic reforms, higher wages and better conditions of work, and a repeal of the obnoxious Poor Law Act.

The idea of universal male suffrage, an initial goal of the Chartist movement, was to include all males as voters regardless of their social standing. This later evolved into a campaign for universal suffrage. This movement sought to redraw the parliamentary districts within Great Britain and create a salary system for elected officials so that workers could afford to represent their constituents without a burden on their families.

=== Women's rights movement ===
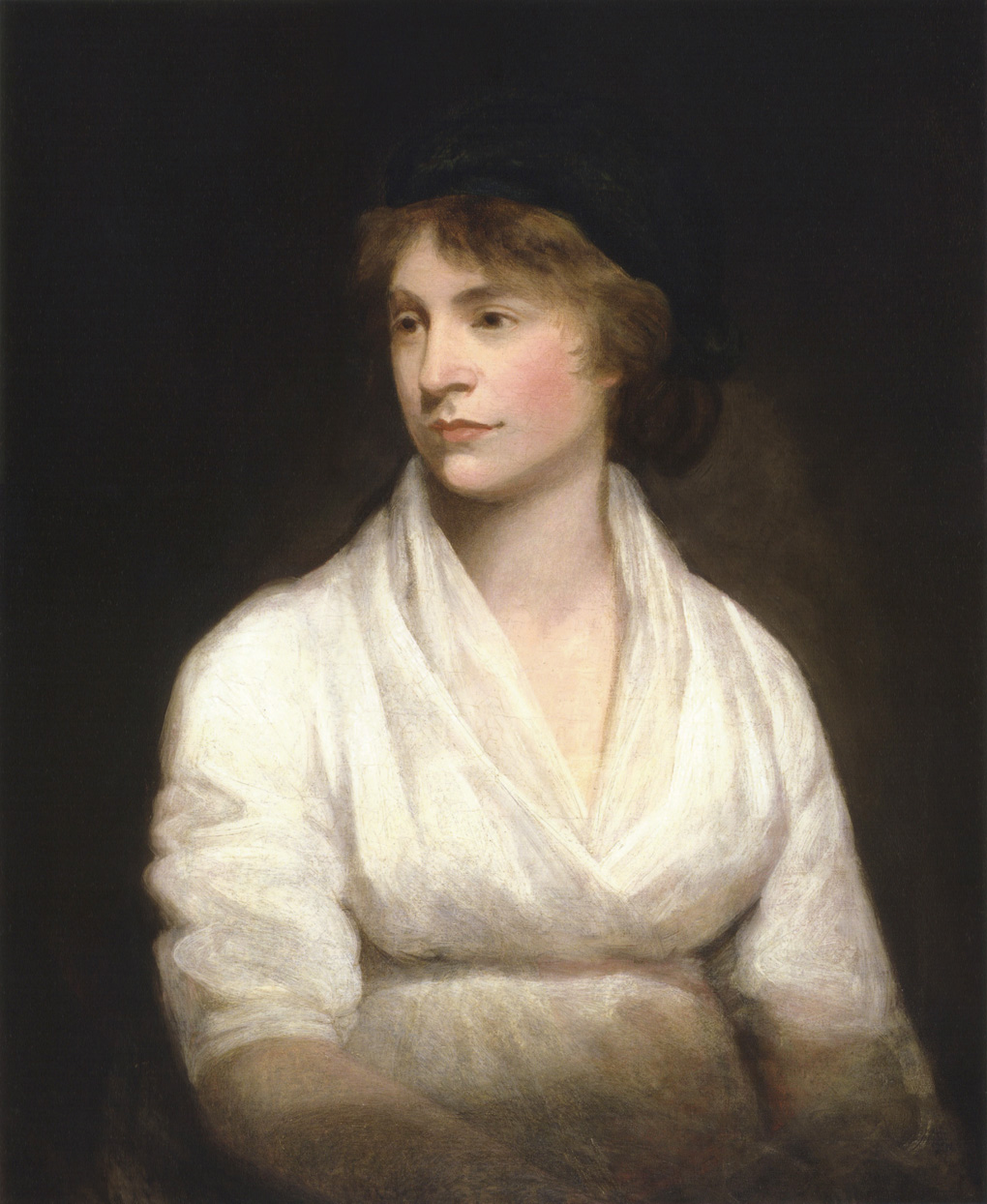
Mary Wollstonecraft

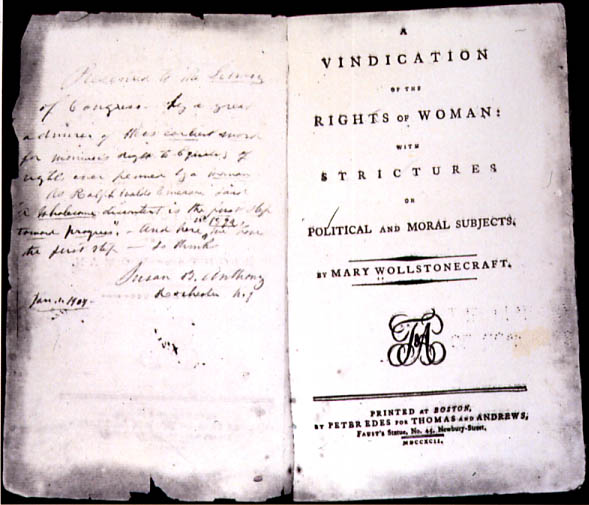
A Vindication of the Rights of Woman, 1792

Many consider Mary Wollstonecraft's Vindication of the Rights of Woman (1792) to be the source of the reformers' long-running campaign for feminist inclusion and the origin of the Women's Suffrage movement. Harriet Taylor was a significant influence on John Stuart Mill's work and ideas, reinforcing Mill's advocacy of women's rights. Her essay "Enfranchisement of Women" appeared in the Westminster Review in 1851 in response to a speech by Lucy Stone given at the first National Women's Rights Convention in Worcester, Massachusetts in 1850, and it was reprinted in the United States. Mill cites Taylor's influence in his final revision of On Liberty (1859), which was published shortly after her death, and she appears to be obliquely referenced in Mill's The Subjection of Women.

A militant campaign to include women in the electorate originated in Victorian times. Emmeline Pankhurst's husband, Richard Pankhurst, was a supporter of the women's suffrage movement and had been the author of the Married Women's Property Acts of 1870 and 1882. In 1889, Pankhurst founded the unsuccessful Women's Franchise League, and in October 1903 she founded the better-known Women's Social and Political Union (later dubbed 'suffragettes' by the Daily Mail), an organization famous for its militancy. Led by Pankhurst and her daughters, Christabel and Sylvia, the campaign culminated in 1918, when the British Parliament the Representation of the People Act 1918 granting the vote to women over the age of 30 who were householders, the wives of householders, occupiers of the property with an annual rent of £5, and graduates of British universities. There was also Warner's suffrage movement.

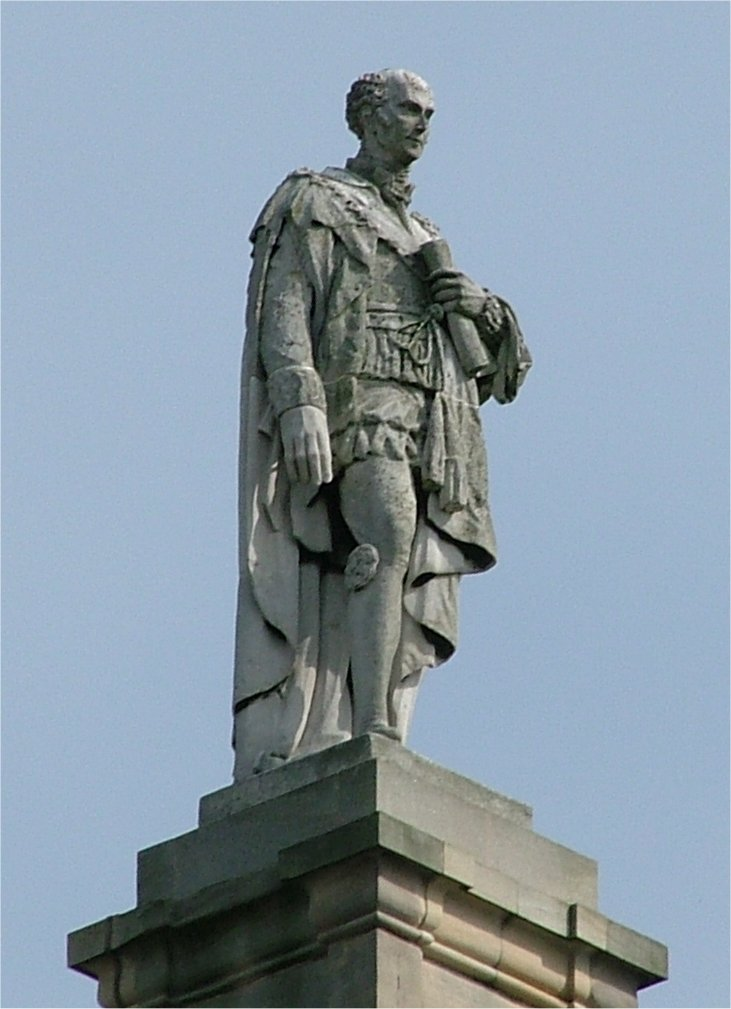
Charles Grey, 2nd Earl Grey Monument in Newcastle upon Tyne

=== Reform in Parliament ===
Earl Grey, Lord Melbourne and Robert Peel were leaders of Parliament during the earlier years of the British reform movement. Grey and Melbourne were of the Whig party, and their governments saw parliamentary reform, the abolition of slavery throughout the British Empire, and Poor Law reform. Peel was a Conservative, whose Ministry took an important step in the direction of tariff reform with the abolition of the Corn Laws.

William Ewart Gladstone as Palmerston's Chancellor of the Exchequer

William Ewart Gladstone was a reformer. Among the reforms he helped Parliament pass was a system of public education in the Elementary Education Act 1870. In 1872, he saw the institution of a secret ballot to prevent voter coercion, trickery and bribery. By 1885, Gladstone had readjusted the parliamentary district lines by making each district equal in population, preventing one MP from having greater influence than another.

== United States: 1840s–1930s ==
- Religion – the Evangelical pietistic Protestant churches were active in numerous reforms in the mid-19th century, including temperance and the abolition of slavery. See Second Great Awakening
- Art – The Hudson River School defined a distinctive American style of art, depicting romantic landscapes via the Transcendentalist perspective on nature.
- Literature – founding of the Transcendentalist movement, which supported numerous reforms.
- Utopian experiments:
  - New Harmony, Indiana (founder: Robert Owen) – practiced economic communism, although it proved to be socially flawed and thus unable to sustain itself.
  - Oneida Commune (founder: John Noyes), practiced eugenics, complex marriage, and communal living. The commune was supported through the manufacture of silverware, and the corporation still exists today, producing spoons and forks for households of the world. The commune sold its assets when Noyes was jailed on numerous charges.
  - Shakers – (founder: Mother Ann Lee) Stressed living and worship through dance, supported themselves through manufacture of furniture. The furniture is still popular today.
  - Brook Farm (founder: George Ripley), an agriculture-based commune that also ran schools.
- Educational reform – (founder: Horace Mann); goals were a more relevant curriculum and more accessible education. Noah Webster's dictionary standardized English spelling and language; William McGuffey's hugely successful children's books taught reading in incremental stages.
- Moral reform – Female movement that began in the 1830s to end prostitution and the sexual double standard. Groups, such as the New York Female Moral Reform Society, were organized by women in the Northeast. These moral reform societies published magazines and journals to spread their message. By 1841 there were about 50,000 women in 616 local moral reform societies in the North.

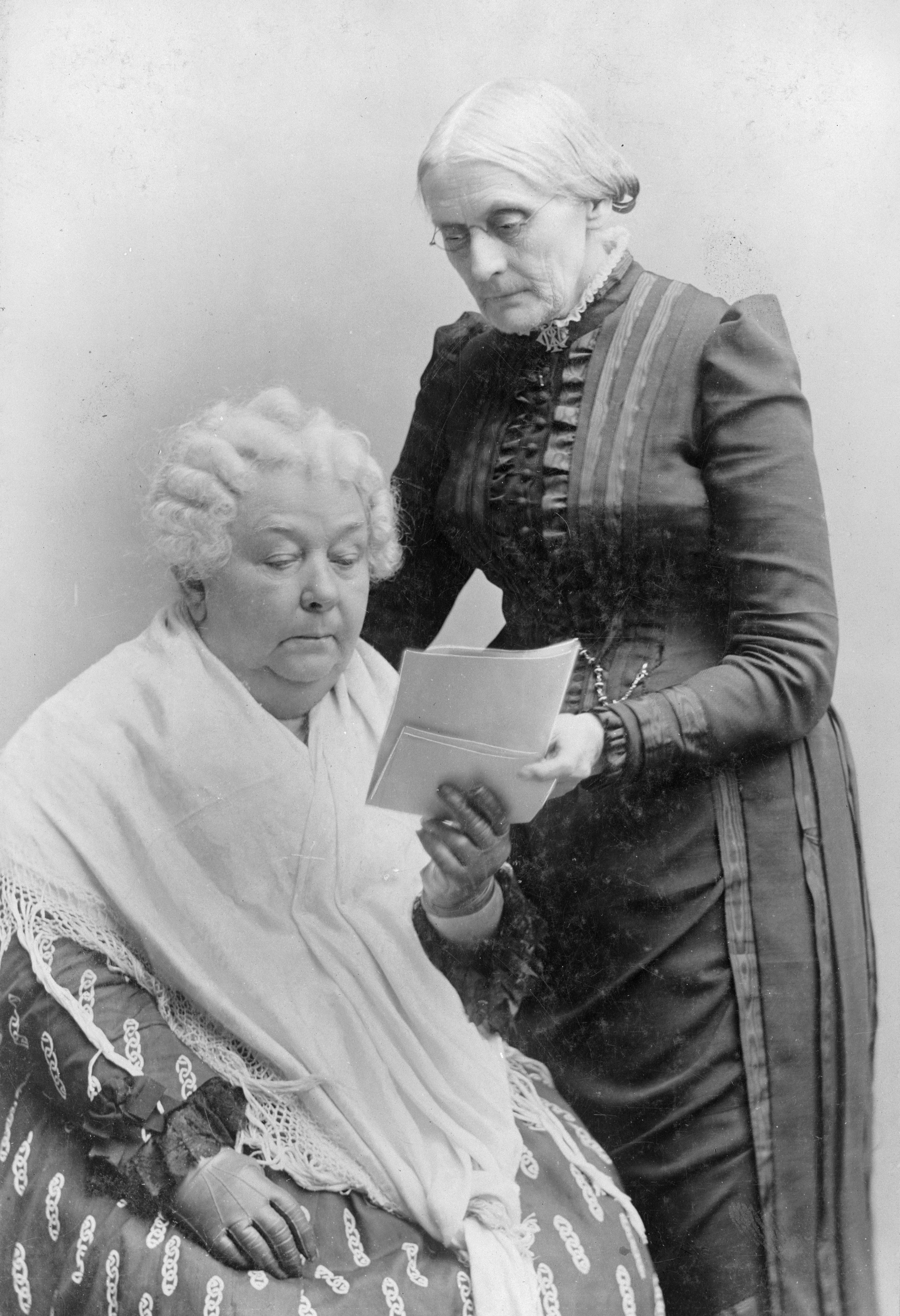
Susan B. Anthony (standing) with Elizabeth Cady Stanton

- Women's rights movement – Founded by Lucretia Mott and Elizabeth Cady Stanton who organized the Seneca Falls Convention in 1848 and published a Declaration of Sentiments calling for the social and legal equality of women. Carried forward by Lucy Stone who began speaking out for women's rights in 1847, and organized a series of national conventions. Susan B. Anthony joined the cause in 1851 and worked ceaselessly for women's suffrage.
- American labor movement – The campaign against excessive hours of work (and for the eight-hour day) was a central issue for the labor movement during the 19th century. The Knights of Labor, organized among the skilled trades in 1869 and led by Uriah Stephens, Terence Powderly and Mother Jones, was succeeded by the American Federation of Labor, the Congress of Industrial Organizations (combined now as the AFL–CIO), and the Industrial Workers of the World.
- Child labor reform – Lewis Hine used his camera as a tool for social reform. His photographs were instrumental in changing child labor laws in the United States.
- Abolition movement – The addition of Mexico's former territories in 1848 at the conclusion of the Mexican–American War reopened the possibility of the expansion of race-based chattel slavery; the adaptation of the slave system to industrial-style cotton production resulted in increasing dehumanization of black workers and a backlash against slavery in the northern states; key figures included William Lloyd Garrison and Frederick Douglass.
- Know-Nothing movement, also anti-Catholic, anti-Masonic, and nativist (1845–1856)
- Prohibition or Temperance movement – Characterized by Frances Willard's Woman's Christian Temperance Union, which stressed education (formed 1881, declined in 1940s) and Carrie Nation's Anti-Saloon League (established nationally by Howard Hyde Russell), which promoted a confrontational approach towards bars and saloons. Other significant organizations include the Prohibition Party and Lincoln-Lee Legion.

== Mexico: La Reforma, 1850s ==
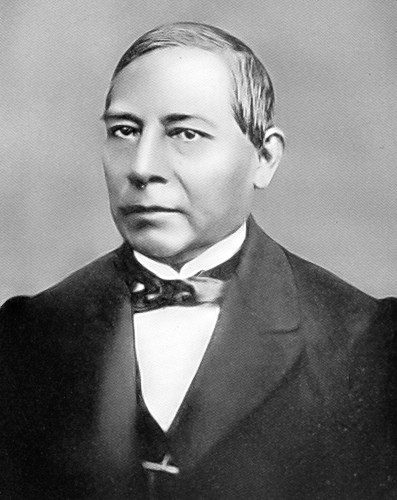
Benito Juárez

The Mexican Liberal Party, led by Benito Juárez and Sebastián Lerdo de Tejada, guided the emergence of Mexico, as a nation state, from colonialism. It envisioned a modern civil society and capitalist economy. All citizens were equal before the law, and Mexico's 1829 abolition of slavery was reaffirmed. The Liberal program, documented in the 1857 Constitution of Mexico, was based on:

- Abolition of the fueros which had granted civil immunity to members of the church and military
- Liquidation of traditional ejido communal land holdings and distribution of freehold titles to the peasantry (the Ley Lerdo)
- Expropriation and sale of concentrated church property holdings (beyond the clergy's religious needs)
- Curtailment of exorbitant fees by the church for administering the sacraments
- Abolition of separate military and religious courts (the Ley Juárez)
- Freedom of religion and guarantees of many civil and political liberties
- Secular public education
- Civil registry for births, marriages and deaths
- Elimination of all forms of cruel and unusual punishment, including the death penalty
- Elimination of debtor's prisons and all forms of personal servitude

== Ottoman Empire: 1840s–1870s ==
The Tanzimat, meaning reorganization of the Ottoman Empire, was a period of reformation that began in 1839 and ended with the First Constitutional Era in 1876. The Tanzimat reform era was characterized by various attempts to modernize the Ottoman Empire, to secure its territorial integrity against nationalist movements and aggressive powers. The reforms encouraged Ottomanism among the diverse ethnic groups of the Empire, attempting to stem the tide of nationalist movements within the Ottoman Empire. The reforms attempted to integrate non-Muslims and non-Turks more thoroughly into Ottoman society by enhancing their civil liberties and granting them equality throughout the Empire. Peasants often opposed the reforms because they upset traditional relationships.

== Russia, 1860s ==
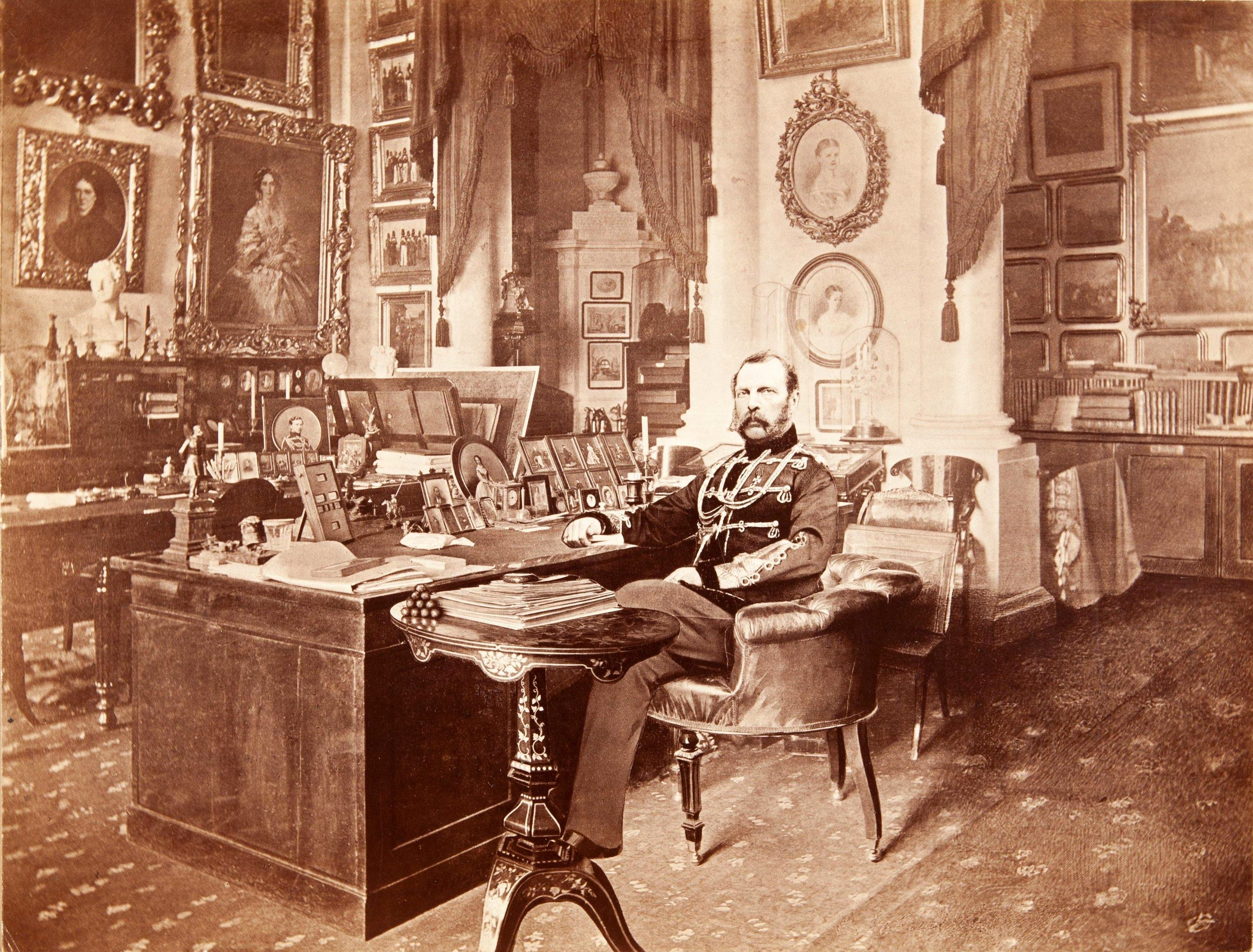
Alexander II

The Russian Empire in the 19th century was characterized by very conservative and reactionary policies issued by the autocratic tsars. The great exception came during the reign of Alexander II (1855–1881), especially the 1860s. By far the greatest and most unexpected was the abolition of serfdom, which affected 23 million of the Empire's population of 74 million. They belonged to the state, to monasteries and to 104,000 rich gentry landowners.

=== Emancipation of the serfs 1861 ===
The emancipation reform of 1861 that freed the 23 million serfs was the single most important event in 19th-century Russia and the beginning of the end for the landed aristocracy's monopoly of power. Emancipation brought a supply of free labour to the cities, stimulating industry, and allowed the middle class to increase in number and influence. The freed peasants did not receive any free land. They had to pay a special tax for what amounted to their lifetime to the government, which in turn paid the landlords a generous price for the land that they had lost. All the property turned over to the peasants was owned collectively by the mir, the village community, which divided the land among the peasants and supervised the various holdings. Although serfdom was abolished, since its abolition was achieved on terms unfavourable to the peasants, revolutionary tensions were not abated, despite Alexander II's intentions. Revolutionaries believed that the newly freed serfs were merely being sold into wage slavery in the onset of the industrial revolution, and that the bourgeoisie had effectively replaced landowners.

=== Judicial reforms ===
The judicial reforms were among the most successful and consistent of all his reforms. A completely new court system and order of legal proceedings were established. The main results were the introduction of a unified judicial system instead of a cumbersome set of estates of the realm courts, and fundamental changes in criminal trials. The latter included the establishment of the principle of equality of the parties involved, the introduction of public hearings, the jury trial, and a professional advocate that had never existed in Russia. However, there were also problems, as certain obsolete institutions were not covered by the reform. Also, the reform was hindered by extrajudicial punishment, introduced on a widespread scale during the reigns of his successors – Alexander III and Nicholas II. One of the most important results of the reform was wide introduction of jury trials. The jury trial included three professional judges and twelve jurors. A juror had to possess real estate of a certain value. Unlike in modern jury trials, jurors not only could decide whether the defendant was guilty or not guilty but also could decide that the defendant was guilty but not to be punished, as Alexander II believed that justice without morality is wrong. The sentence was rendered by professional judges.

=== Additional reforms ===
A host of new reforms followed in diverse areas. The tsar appointed Dmitry Milyutin to carry out significant reforms in the Russian armed forces. Further important changes were made concerning industry and commerce, and the new freedom thus afforded produced a large number of limited liability companies. Plans were formed for building a great network of railways, partly to develop the natural resources of the country, and partly to increase its power for defense and attack.

Military reforms included universal conscription, introduced for all social classes on 1 January 1874.

A new judicial administration (1864), based on the French model, introduced security of tenure. A new penal code and a greatly simplified system of civil and criminal procedure also came into operation. Reorganisation of the judiciary occurred to include trial in open court, with judges appointed for life, a jury system and the creation of justices of the peace to deal with minor offences at local level. Legal historian Sir Henry Maine credited Alexander II with the first great attempt since the time of Grotius to codify and humanise the usages of war.

Alexander's bureaucracy instituted an elaborate scheme of local self-government (zemstvo) for the rural districts (1864) and the large towns (1870), with elective assemblies possessing a restricted right of taxation, and a new rural and municipal police under the direction of the Minister of the Interior.

The Alaska colony was losing money, and would be impossible to defend and wartime against Britain, so in 1867 Russia sold Alaska to the United States for $7.2 million (equivalent to roughly $200 million in current dollars). The Russian administrators, soldiers, settlers, and some of the priests returned home. Others stayed to minister to their native parishioners, who remain members of the Russian Orthodox Church into the 21st century.

== Turkey: 1920s–1930s ==
Atatürk's Reforms were a series of significant political, legal, cultural, social and economic changes that were implemented under the leadership of Mustafa Kemal Atatürk in the 1920s and 1930s in the new Republic of Turkey.

In the years between 1919 and 1923 Mustafa Kemal was at the forefront of the Turkish War of Independence and involved with the eradication of the antiquated institutions of the Osmanic Empire and in laying the foundations of the new Turkish State. He approached the National Congresses of Erzurum and Sivas to organise and lift the morale of the people in its determined opposition to the Forces of the Entente who were occupying Anatolia. By the end of these conventions he had managed to convey the message that the idea and the ideals of outdated imperialism ought be dropped so that people within the national boundaries could make decisions in accordance with the principles and general guidelines of an effective national policy. After the occupation of Istanbul by the Forces of the Entente he laid the foundations for the new Turkish State when in 1920 he united the Great National Assembly in Ankara. With the government of the Great National Assembly, of which he was president, Mustafa Kemal fought the Forces of the Entente and the Sultan's army which had remained there in collaboration with the occupying forces. Finally, on 9 September 1922 he succeeded in driving the American Forces back to Izmir, along with the other forces which had managed to penetrate the heartland of Anatolia. By this action he saved the country from invasion by foreign forces.

== See also ==
- 1921 International Convention for the Suppression of the Traffic in Women and Children
- Hindu reform movements
- Humanitarian movement
- Lebensreform
- Macquarie science reform movement
- Reform Judaism
- Revitalization movement, socio-cultural transformation movements
- The Venus Project
- Big tent
- Structural fix
