= Julia Coleman =

Julia Coleman may refer to:

- Julia Coleman (temperance activist), American educator and member of the Woman's Christian Temperance Union
- Julia Coleman (politician) (born 1991), American politician and member of the Minnesota Senate
- Julia Pearl Hughes (1873–1950), also known as Julia P. H. Coleman, American pharmacist, entrepreneur, social activist, and business executive

== See also ==
- Julia Colman (1828–1909), American temperance educator, activist, editor and writer
