= Lincoln League (disambiguation) =

The Lincoln League was an American political organization established in 1916.

Lincoln League may also refer to:

- Lincoln–Lee Legion, originally named the Lincoln League, an American temperance organization founded in 1903
- Lincoln League, a league of the Lincolnshire Football Association, England
