= World League Against Alcoholism =

Anti-alcohol organization advocating for global Prohibition

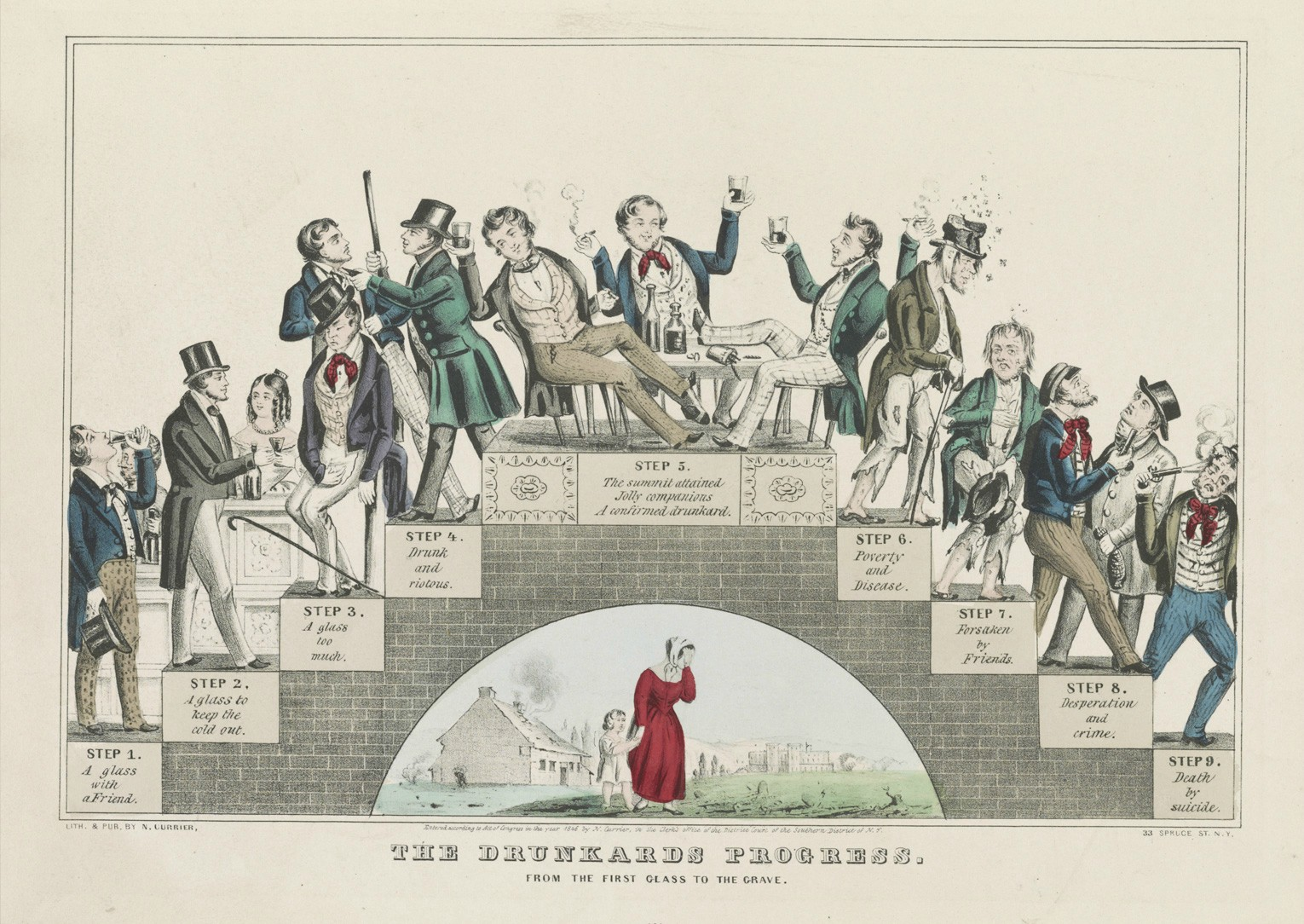
The Drunkard's Progress, A lithograph by Nathaniel Currier supporting the temperance movement, January 1846.

The World League Against Alcoholism (WLAA) was organized by the Anti-Saloon League, whose goal became establishing prohibition not only in the United States but throughout the entire world.

As ratification of the Eighteenth Amendment creating prohibition in the U.S. neared, Anti-Saloon leader Ernest Cherrington promoted the creation of the WLAA, which was founded in 1919. Members and supporters of the WLAA saw alcohol as "the poisoning of the body, germ-plasm, mind, conduct and society".

== History ==
The WLAA was formed in Washington, D.C., by Ernest Cherrington. Concerned about alcohol abuse, he left a teaching job to become a reporter and critic of alcohol. Then, in 1901, "the Ohio ASL [Anti-Saloon League] appointed him assistant head. Next, the Washington state ASL appointed him its leader". Cherrington then went on to help found the WLAA in 1919, at age 42. At the time, the Sunday Star described Cherrington as having "the charm and ease of manner of a senator in his palmiest days". He was elected general secretary and instructed to open permanent offices for the WLAA in Washington. Miles Yokes from Toronto, Canada, was chosen as treasurer.

By 1919, these were among the first countries expected to join the WLAA:

1. United States
2. Canada
3. Mexico
4. Japan
5. Scotland
6. Ireland
7. England
8. France
9. Belgium
10. Denmark
11. Switzerland
12. Australia
13. New Zealand
14. Sweden
15. Czechoslovakia
16. Italy

This list, however, is no simple ranking but rather just a list of those viewed most aligned (i.e., Canada), a top five number to push for (i.e., Great Britain, France, Italy, Japan, and Germany), and others deemed more challenging.

Contrastingly, and as a matter of priority, WLAA leaders opted to first focus on the Islamic world; lands of the former and fragmenting Ottoman Empire, British India, and so on. Figures like Cherrington sought to commence the WLAA's work with sites where they felt they could attain and demonstrate quick victories for the globalized teetotaling cause. Given prevailing nominal proscriptions of alcohol under most articulations of Islam, they felt assured of victory in places like Ottoman and republican Turkey, Egypt, the Palestinian Mandate, and the Iraqi Mandate.

In 1922, Anna Adams Gordon was elected to be one of the presidents of the WLAA. She spoke at a conference in 1922, in Toronto, and her message was "a plea for closer cooperation on the part of all temperance organizations everywhere for the great common objective of ‘the fight for a clear brain.'"

The WLAA wanted to target Scotland first, because they believed that if they were successful in Scotland, then England, Ireland and Wales would soon follow. Cherrington also wanted to bring prohibition to Japan. He chose Japan because of its progressiveness. He believed that China and other countries near Japan would follow in Japan's footsteps. Cherrington believed that Germany might even be one of the first countries in Europe to adopt prohibition. He thought this because, even though Germany was one of the most beer drinking countries in the world, German scientists and educators had done scientific studies on alcoholic beverages and the negative effects of them.

Following the repeal of prohibition in 1933, the Anti-Saloon League's fortunes fell dramatically, with its bank failing. It became unable to continue supporting the World League Against Alcoholism. Cherrington was forced to lead it with little income. Following the Great Depression, the World League failed and fell out of existence.

== Constitution ==
Part of the constitution of the WLAA stated:

"The object of this league is to attain by means of education and legislation the total suppression throughout the world of alcoholism, which is the poisoning of body germ-plasm, mind, conduct and society, produced by the consumption of alcoholic beverages. This league pledges itself to avoid affiliation with any political party as such, and to maintain an attitude of strict neutrality on all questions of public policy not directly and immediately concerned with the traffic in alcoholic beverages."

It also stated that the WLAA would have a meeting every 3 years, starting in October 1919, in Washington.

== Activities ==
This league spread awareness of their goals by publishing cartoons, encyclopedias (the Standard Encyclopedia of the Alcohol Problem), fliers, periodicals, songs, stories, dramas and yearbooks. These publications appealed to intellect and emotion. For example, here are two different fliers, one appealed to intellect and another appealed to emotion. A pamphlet written by Cherrington for the WLAA says that youth should have the right to know all the facts about alcoholic beverages, since it could greatly affect "physical fitness, social hygiene and the general public weal".

The WLAA assisted speakers and educational materials to advance an international temperance movement spanning six continents. Their first international convention was held in 1923, with attendees from 66 countries. Temperance movements from around the world gave support and cooperation to the WLAA. Examples of these temperance movements were the National Temperance League in Japan, the New Zealand alliance for the abolition of liquor traffic, the Irish Temperance League, the Temperance Committee of the Presbyterian Church in Ireland, etc. Poster, educational materials and speakers were provided to help promote the cause worldwide.

== Notable people ==
- Ernest Cherrington, founder, WLAA
- Deborah Knox Livingston, member, Executive Committee, WLAA

=== Presidents ===
The WLAA presidents included:

- Anna Adams Gordon, from the U.S. (Joint President)
- Leif Jones, from London, England
- Robert Hercord, from Lausanne, Switzerland, who also served as secretary of the International Temperance Bureau
- Howard H. Russel, from Westerville, Ohio. He was also the founder of the Anti-Saloon League
- Emile Vandervelde, from Brussels, Belgium

== Sources ==
- Cherrington, Ernest. America and the World Liquor Problem. Westerville, OH: American Issue Publishing Co., 1922.
- Odegard, Peter H. Pressure Politics: The Story of the Anti-Saloon League. NY: Columbia University Press, 1928.
- Westerville (Ohio) Public Library. Leaders: Ernest Cherrington. Westerville Public Library website.
- 1923 News on the State of Worldwide Prohibition. World prohibition. (2012).
- Alcohol prohibition in the USA. Ian Tyrrell. (2010, November 15).
- Evered, Emine Ö. 2024. Prohibition in Turkey: Alcohol and the Politics of Identity. Austin: University of Texas Press.
- Evered, Emine Ö. 2022. Anti-alcoholism, Turkish and American non-state actors, and their mutual pursuits of national and global sobriety, Middle Eastern Studies, 58:2, 256-270, DOI: 10.1080/00263206.2021.2007084.
- World League against alcoholism: World-wide prohibition. Alcohol Problems and Solutions. (2023, May 8).
