= Edith Smith Davis =

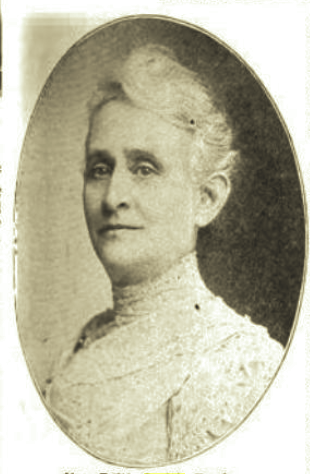
Edith Smith Davis (Union Signal, 1918)

Edith Smith Davis (January 20, 1869 – 1918) was a major leader in the temperance movement. Born on a farm near Janesville, Wisconsin, she served as Superintendent of the Bureau of Scientific Investigation and the Department of Scientific Temperance Instruction of both the U.S and the international Woman's Christian Temperance Union. Smith also edited The Temperance Education Quarterly (1910–1917). In 1884 she married Rev. J. S. Davis and began her work in the WCTU. In 1907, she received an honorary Doctor of Letters (Litt.D) degree from Lawrence University. Her book Whether White or Black a Man—a critique of racist attitudes in the Jim Crow Era—was published in 1898 by the Fleming H. Revell religious publishers. She considered it to be in the footsteps of Harriet Beecher Stowe's Uncle Tom's Cabin.

== Sources ==
- The Temperance Educational Quarterly
- International Women's Periodicals
