= Julia Coleman (temperance activist) =

American educator

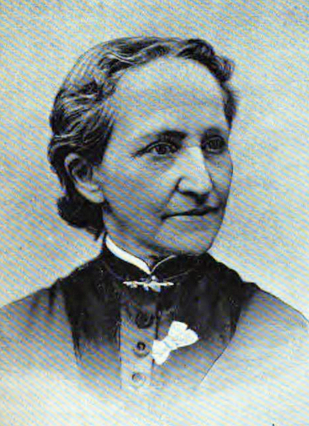
Julia Coleman (1887)

Julia Coleman was an American educator from the state of New York. She was Superintendent of the Literature (publications) Department of the Women's Christian Temperance Union (WCTU). In 1868 she presented a lecture on "Alcohol our Enemy" at her church and quickly became involved in anti-alcohol activities. She wrote temperance articles for the National Temperance Publishing House and the Youth's Temperance Visitor. She then became convinced that temperance should be taught in the schools, a belief shared by Mary Hunt, with whom she worked closely. In doing so she contributed significantly to Scientific Temperance Instruction and was an important part of the temperance movement.

== Sources ==
- Willard, Frances E. Women and Temperance. Hartford, Connecticut: Park Publishing, 1883.
