= William E. Johnson (prohibitionist) =

American prohibitionist

William Eugene Johnson
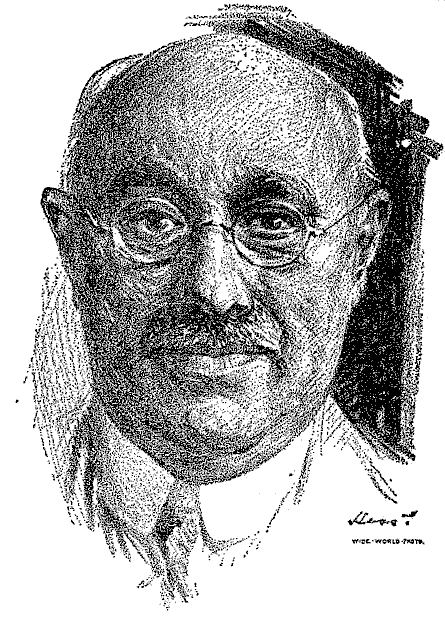
- William E. "Pussyfoot" Johnson
- Born: 25 March 1862; Coventry, New York
- Died: 2 February 1945 (aged 82); Chenango County, New York
- Occupations: Prohibition leader, law enforcement
- Spouses: Lillie M. Trevitt (m. 1886–1927) May B. Stanley (m. 1928–1945)

William Eugene "Pussyfoot" Johnson (25 March 1862 – 2 February 1945) was an American Prohibition advocate and law enforcement officer. In pursuit of his campaign to outlaw intoxicating beverages, he went undercover, posing as an habitué of saloons and collecting information against their owners.

== Nickname ==
He gained the nickname "Pussyfoot" due to his cat-like stealth in the pursuit of suspects in the Oklahoma Territory. Newspapers in Muskogee, Oklahoma referred to him as “the gent with the panther tread,” which led to "Pussyfoot." Johnson said that he wore rubber heels on his shoes.

A non-alcoholic "Pussyfoot" drink named for him was invented in 1920 by Robert Vermiere at The Embassy Club, London, England.

== Biography ==
Born in Coventry, New York, Johnson was educated at the University of Nebraska. Following college, he stayed in Lincoln, Nebraska, and worked at The Lincoln Daily News before becoming manager of the Nebraska News Bureau. He met Lillie M. Trevitt while in Lincoln and the two were married in 1886. Johnson's first wife died in 1927 and he married May B. Stanley of Washington, D.C., in 1928.

During his time in Nebraska, Johnson's views on temperance were formed and he gained a reputation as a Prohibitionist. In 1889, while Nebraska was engaged in a debate over statewide prohibition, Johnson posed as an anti-Prohibitionist to obtain information from brewery and saloon owners. He then published information which was detrimental to the "wet" cause.

Johnson's temperance activities earned him governmental notice and he was appointed special agent of the Department of the Interior to enforce laws in Indian Territory and Oklahoma in 1906. He was chief agent of the United States Indian Service from July 1908 until September 1911 and secured more than 4,400 convictions through a practice of sweeping into gambling saloons and other disorderly places. Saloon keepers affected by Johnson's raids banded together to offer a US$3,000 reward for his death. Upon learning of the reward, Johnson changed to nighttime raids and destroyed most of the raided establishments.

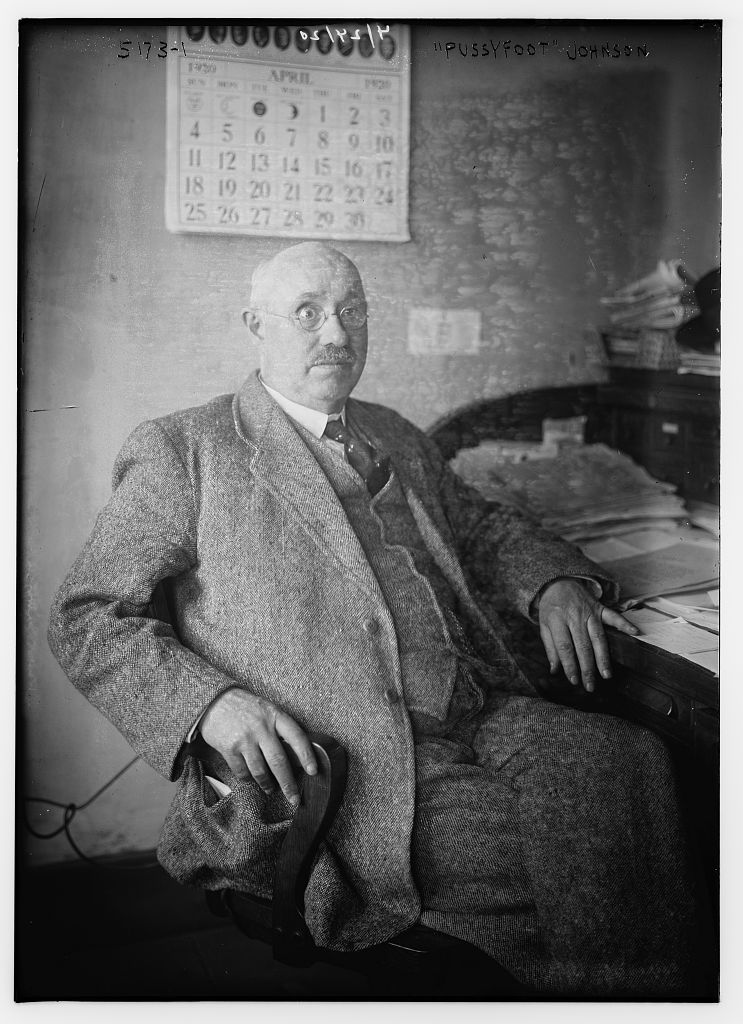
A news agency photograph of Johnson in April 1920.

After resigning from federal service, he moved to Kansas and began working with the Anti-Saloon League. There "he developed some of the tactics that would later be widely used in the Anti-Saloon League. For example, he wrote to wet leaders falsely claiming to be a brewer and asked for advice on how to defeat temperance activists. He then published the letters he received to embarrass and discredit his opposition."

Johnson served as managing editor of 35 Anti-Saloon League publications between 1912 and 1926 before becoming manager and then director of the London office of the World League Against Alcoholism. He was a member of the International Temperance Committee of Fifty in Paris (1919) and was also a delegate to the fourteenth International Anti-Alcoholic Congress in Milan (1913) and Tartu (1926).

In addition to his work within the United States, Johnson toured internationally to promote Prohibition. On 13 November 1919, he was captured by a mob of medical students while at a speaking engagement at Essex Hall and paraded through the streets of London on a stretcher before being rescued by police. During the ragging, Johnson was struck by an object thrown from the crowd and lost his right eye after physicians were unable to repair the resulting damage. In April 1921, Johnson was booed into silence at Toronto's Massey Hall and at a rally in downtown Windsor while campaigning for tightening Ontario's prohibition laws. The big Windsor crowd—in a city at the hub of "rumrunner" smuggling—was so hostile that Johnson had to be surrounded by police and escorted to Detroit.

Johnson retired from public life in 1930, returning to his family farm in Chenango County, New York, until his death on 2 February 1945.

== See also ==
- Pressure politics
