= Howard Hyde Russell =

American lawyer and clergyman

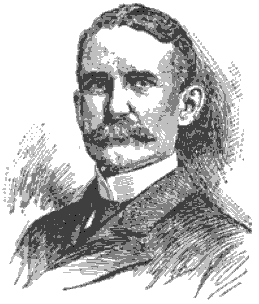
- Born: October 21, 1855; Stillwater, Minnesota, U.S.
- Died: June 30, 1946 (aged 90); New York City, U.S.
- Education: Griswold College; Iowa College of Law; Oberlin College
- Occupations: Lawyer, clergyman
- Spouse: Lillian Davis (m. 1880)

Howard Hyde Russell (October 21, 1855 – June 30, 1946) was an American lawyer and clergyman, the founder of the Anti-Saloon League.

== Biography ==
Howard Hyde Russell was born in Stillwater, Minnesota, on October 21, 1855. He was educated at Griswold College and the Iowa College of Law, and worked as a lawyer in Corning for six years. He married Lillian Davis on August 17, 1880, and they had two children.

Following a religious conversion, he gave up the practice of law to become a minister, studying theology at Oberlin College for five years.

In 1893, he organized the Ohio Anti-Saloon League. In 1895, when the Anti-Saloon League was established at the national level, Russell was elected superintendent. He mentored future leaders of the league, including Wayne Wheeler and Ernest Cherrington.

Russell also established the Lincoln-Lee Legion to promote the signing of temperance pledges by children and other young people. He is reported to have raised five million dollars to promote the temperance movement.

Russell was also the author of A Lawyer's Examination of the Bible, which is a work of Christian apologetics that argues the evidences for the Bible's authenticity concerning the life, teachings, death and resurrection of Jesus Christ. Russell believed that the testimony of the writers of the gospels could be tested by technical legal criteria and argued that such testimony was trustworthy. In this respect, he followed the arguments presented by the 19th century Harvard Law School professor Simon Greenleaf in his book The Testimony of the Evangelist. Russell's book was first published in 1893 and then re-released in 1935.

He died at his home in Westerville, Ohio, on June 30, 1946.

Ernie Pyle devotes an entire chapter to Mr. Russell in his book, Home Country.
