= Alcohol Justice =

Research and policy organization

- Abbreviation: AJ
- Formation: 1987
- Type: Non-profit 501(c)(3)
- Purpose: Public health advocacy and policy
- Location: San Rafael, California
- Region served: United States
- Exec. Dir/CEO: Bruce Lee Livingston
- Staff: 10
- Website: alcoholjustice.org

Alcohol Justice is a San Rafael, California–based non-profit advocacy, research and policy organization describing itself as "the industry watchdog". The Marin Institute was renamed and re-branded as Alcohol Justice in 2011; it was originally named The Marin Institute for the Prevention of Alcohol and Other Drug Problems.

In 2006, Alcohol Justice shifted its focus to the practices of alcohol corporations who produce, distribute, retail and advertise alcoholic beverages. Until 2006, Alcohol Justice focused strictly on alcohol harms and environmental prevention strategies. These strategies included reducing the hours during which time alcohol can be sold, increasing the size of warning labels on alcoholic beverage containers, requiring warnings on all alcohol advertisements, restricting the content and placement of alcohol ads, and prohibiting alcohol sponsorship of athletic events.

== History ==
Alcohol Justice was established in 1987 as one of three major projects funded by the Leonard and Beryl H. Buck Trust at the same time the Marin Community Foundation was formed. The Marin Institute reported in 2006 that "countering the alcohol industry has always been a high priority for the Marin Institute, but we now want to make it the central focus of our efforts. That means we'll put 100% of our energy into stopping the alcohol industry from harming public health." In July 2011, the Marin Institute changed its name to Alcohol Justice to better align the organization's name with the national reach of its network.

== Campaigns and programs ==
Alcohol Justice, although based in San Rafael, California, plays a research and advocacy role in other cities and counties of California, such as Los Angeles and San Francisco, and has led numerous campaigns for legislation and regulatory reform in Sacramento, California. Nonetheless, it is a national organization that has conducted national and international research projects, conducted hundreds of trainings of youth, community leaders and public health advocates throughout the United States, and participated in international activities as well in Canada, Europe, Africa and Thailand.

=== Alcohol taxes and fees: Charge for Harm ===
The Marin Institute participated in a flurry of alcohol tax increase campaigns in the early 1990s, which resulted in small increases in beer excise taxes in California at the U.S. federal level in 1991 and 1992. From December 2006 to November 2010, The Marin Institute convened and organized a California coalition to promote proposals for nickel or dime a drink excise taxes or mitigation fees, including AB 1019 (Assm. Jim Beall, Dem-Santa Clara) supported in a testimonial video by John O. Whitaker Jr.

The Charge for Harm campaign supported various bills in Sacramento and the San Francisco "Alcohol Cost Recovery Fee" ultimately vetoed by PlumpJack wine-distributorship owning Mayor Gavin Newsom in September 2010. (More info at San Francisco Alcohol Cost Recovery database.)

Ultimately the California campaign ground to a halt in November 2010 with the passage of Proposition 26 with 51.4% of the vote, supported by the Wine Institute, the California Chamber of Commerce, Chevron, and collectively oil, tobacco, and alcohol corporations. Proposition 26 now requires in California a 2/3 vote of both legislative houses to pass impact or mitigation fees to charge industries for the harm caused by production or consumption, and requires a 2/3 vote of the electorate to pass such fees at the municipal or county level.

=== Stop Alcopops ===
Alcohol Justice argues that alcopops should be regulated because they appeal to youth, who might not like other alcoholic beverages. When caffeinated alcoholic beverages, commonly containing 12% ABV and packaged in 24-oz cans, went off the market, the manufacturers of these beverages reformulated the beverages so as to be without caffeine. Alcohol Justice especially argues against the reformulated products partly due to the fact that the alcohol content has not changed. Alcohol Justice is currently lobbying for legislation to limit the size and alcohol concentration of alcopops.
