= Mary Hunt =

American temperance activist (1830–1906)

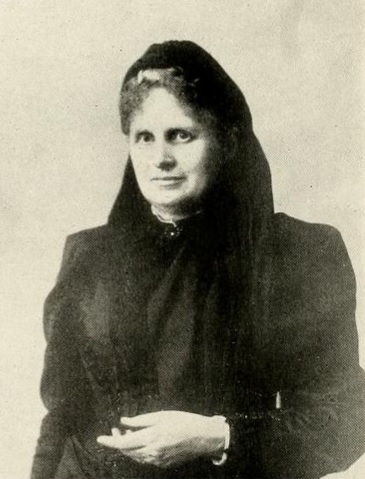
- undated image
- Born: Mary Hannah Hanchett; 1830
- Died: 1906 (aged 75–76)
- Spouse: Leander B. Hunt
- Children: Alfred E. Hunt
- Parent(s): Nancy Swift and Ephraim Hanchett

Mary Hunt (July 4, 1830 – April 24, 1906) was an American activist in the United States temperance movement promoting total abstinence and prohibition of alcohol. She gained the power to accept or reject children's textbooks based on their representation of her views of the danger of alcohol. On her death there were questions asked regarding the finances of the organisation.

== Background ==
Mary Hannah Hanchett was born in Litchfield, Connecticut on July 4, 1830, the daughter of Nancy Swift Hanchett (1804–1897) and Ephraim Hanchett (1803–1854). She graduated from Maryland's Patapsco Female Institute and stayed on to teach science. She married Leander B. Hunt of Massachusetts in 1852 and moved to Hyde Park, Boston. While helping her son Alfred E. Hunt study for a chemistry course at the Massachusetts Institute of Technology, she became interested in how the textbooks addressed the effects of alcohol on the human body. She developed a set of instructional materials for teaching elementary school children about the problems of drinking alcohol.

== Woman's Christian Temperance Union ==
In 1879 Frances Willard invited Hunt to speak on her instructional programming at the national convention of the Woman's Christian Temperance Union. By 1880, Hunt convinced the Woman's Christian Temperance Union to develop its textbook committee into a new Department of Scientific Temperance Instruction. As Superintendent of the national Department of Scientific Temperance Instruction, she worked with local superintendents on how to implement curriculum reform at the state, county and local levels. She provided step-by-step instructions to the WCTU chapters' superintendents for education, including how to put direct, single-issue pressure on elected representatives through demonstrations, meetings, petitions, pamphlets and letters. She envisioned success from the grass roots to the national level to ensure passage of laws requiring that textbooks teach every school child a curriculum promoting complete abstinence for everyone and alcohol prohibition.

She achieved the de facto power to veto any such textbook of which she did not approve. Hunt sent the first of her criteria for acceptable books to publishers, who then submitted the resulting drafts to her for recommendations and possible endorsement. For example, the WCTU leader did not approve of any book that mentioned the widespread medicinal use of alcohol or any book that even implied that drinking in moderation did not inevitably lead to serious alcohol abuse.

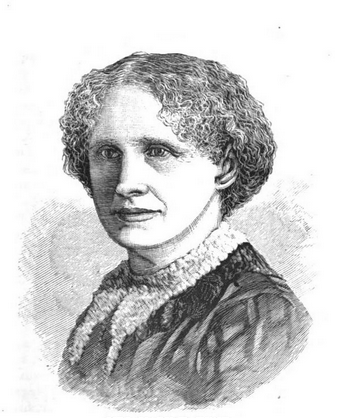
Mary Hanchett Hunt (before 1889)

By the mid-1890s, the WCTU's program of temperance instruction and the textbooks endorsed by Mary Hunt were increasingly being criticized. The Committee of Fifty, a group formed in 1893 by scholars to study the "liquor problem", was highly critical of the ideological purity demanded by Mrs. Hunt. It argued that children should not be taught "facts" that they would later find to be incorrect. The group concluded that the WCTU's program of temperance instruction was seriously defective and probably counter-productive.

Mrs. Hunt prepared a reply in which she charged the Committee of Fifty with being prejudiced against abstinence instruction, criticized it for what she considered gross misrepresentation of facts, and insisted that the endorsed textbooks were completely accurate. She then had the reply entered into the Congressional Record and distributed more than 100,000 copies.

== Death and legacy ==
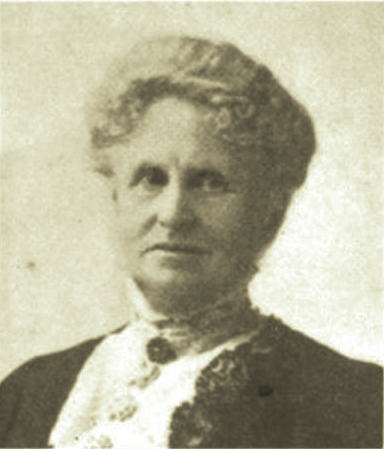
Portrait photo in Standard Encyclopedia of the Alcohol Problem, 1926

Although she stirred controversy, one writer noted that "by the time of her death in 1906, Mary Hunt had shaken and changed the world of education" with her campaign for mandatory temperance instruction. In 1901–1902, 22 million school children were required to take Hunt-approved temperance instruction. "The WCTU was perhaps the most influential lobby ever to shape what was taught in public schools. Though it was a voluntary association, it acquired quasi-public power as a censor of textbooks, a trainer of teachers, and arbiter of morality".

Temperance writers viewed the WCTU's program of compulsory temperance education as a major factor leading to the Eighteenth Amendment establishing National Prohibition. Other knowledgeable observers, such as the U.S. Commissioner of Education, agreed (Timberlake, 1963, p. 46). A study of legislative control of curriculum in 1925 indicated that teaching about temperance "is our nearest approach to a national subject of instruction; it might be called our one minimum essential". The WCTU "laid the groundwork for the formal drug education programs that remain high on the agendas of today", and some of the laws for which Mrs. Hunt lobbied so persistently still remain.

Controversy followed Mary Hunt even after her death. In order to deal with the accusation that she profited from her position and power, Mary Hunt had signed over to charity the royalties due her on the thousands of temperance textbooks sold annually. Her never-publicized charity was the Scientific Temperance Association, a group composed of Hunt, her pastor, and a few friends. Hunt's secretary Cora Frances Stoddard took over the leadership of the organisation. The association used its funds to support the maintenance of the national headquarters of the WCTU's Department of Scientific Temperance Instruction, a large house in Boston that was also Mrs. Hunt's residence.

Emma Lee Benedict Transeau published Hunt's biography in the Scientific Temperance Federation Series.

== Selected works ==
- Hunt, Mary H. A History of the First Decade of the Department of Scientific Temperance Instruction in Schools and Colleges. Boston, MA: Washington Press, 1892.
- Hunt, Mary H. An Epoch of the Nineteenth Century: An Outline of the Work for Scientific Temperance Education in the Public Schools of the United States. Boston, MA: Foster, 1897.
- Hunt, Mary H. Reply to the Physiological Subcommittee of the Committee of Fifty. Boston: Woman’s Christian Temperance Union, 1904. See also 58th Congress, 2d Session. Senate. Document No. 171.
- Hunt, Mary Hannah Hanchett Hunt. In: Garraty, John A. and Cames Mark C. (eds) American National Biography. N.Y.: Oxford University Press, 1999, vol. 11, pp. 498–499.
