= American Issue Publishing House =

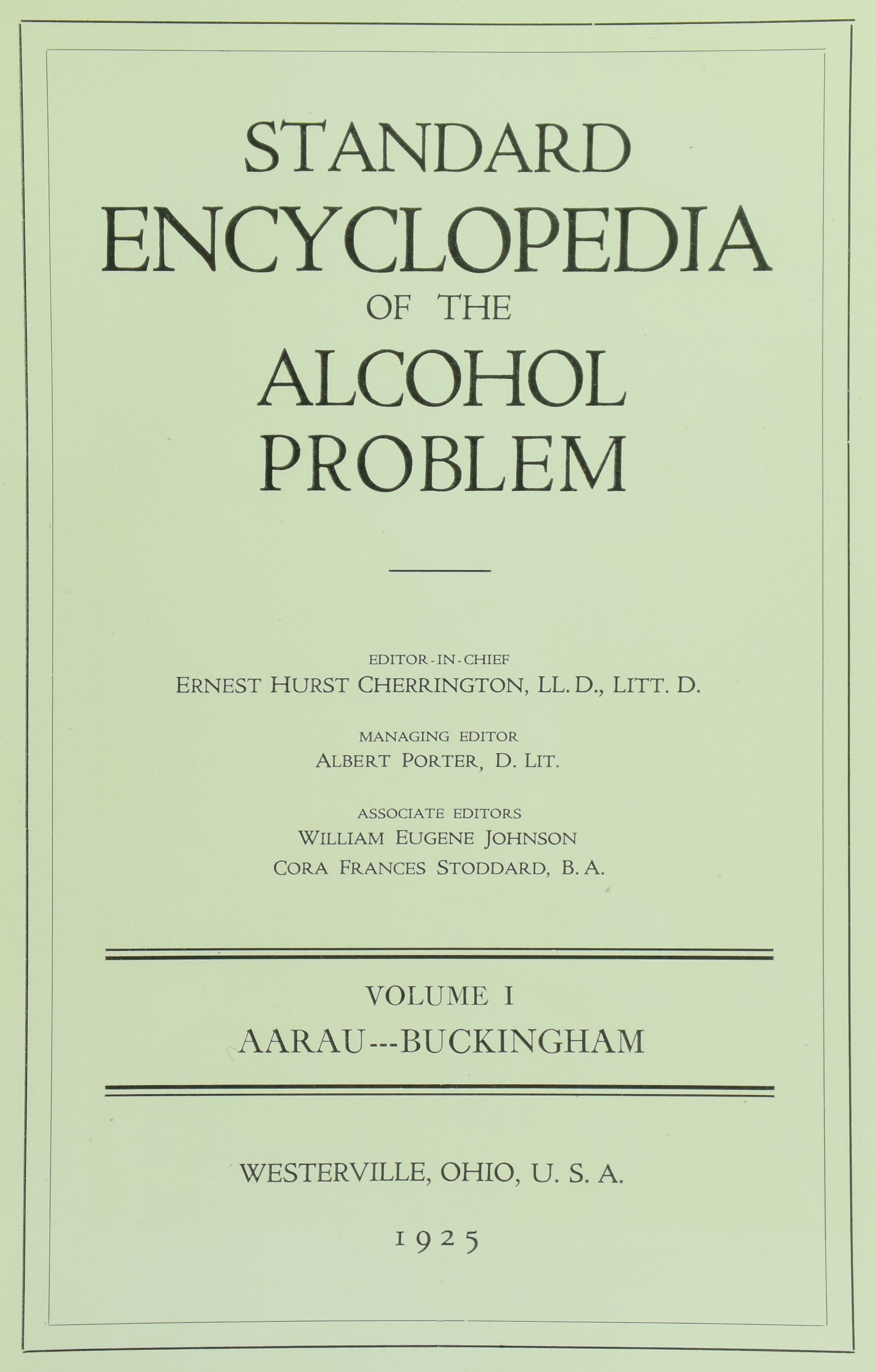
Title page of volume 1 of The Standard Encyclopedia of the Alcohol Problem, published in 1925 by the American Issue Publishing Company

The American Issue Publishing Company, incorporated in 1909, was the holding company of the Anti-Saloon League of America. Its printing presses operated 24 hours a day and it employed 200 people in the small town of Westerville, Ohio, where the company had its headquarters. Within the first three years of its existence the publishing house was producing about 250,000,000 (one quarter billion) book pages per month, and the quantity increased yearly. This dwarfed the output of the National Temperance Society and Publishing House, which took over half a century to print one billion pages.

The American Issue Publishing Company played a major role in advancing the interests of the temperance movement. Not only did it publish an enormous quantity of temperance materials, but it also produced some of the most prestigious temperance publications; including The Standard Encyclopedia of the Alcohol Problem, a multi-volume work edited by Ernest Cherrington and published between 1924 and 1930.

== Sources ==
- Hanson, David J. Preventing Alcohol Abuse: Alcohol, Culture, and Control. Westport, CT: Praeger, 1996.
- Odegard, Peter H. Pressure Politics: The Story of the Anti-Saloon League. NY: Columbia University Press, 1928.
