= Department of Scientific Temperance Instruction =

The Department of Scientific Temperance Instruction, the educational arm of the Woman’s Christian Temperance Union (WCTU), was an important part of the temperance movement and played a significant role in generating support for prohibition of alcohol in the U.S.

== Background ==
Calls for alcohol education were heard as early as 1869, when temperance writer Julia Coleman addressed the Fulton County (NY) Teachers' Institute on the subject. Similar appeals were made by others over the next few years.

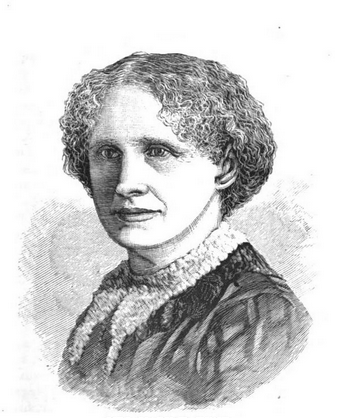
Mary Hanchett Hunt c1880

In 1873 the National Temperance Society called for instruction in public and private schools on the effects of alcohol on the human system. At about the same time, Mary Hunt, a former school teacher, persuaded her local school board in Massachusetts to establish temperance instruction in its schools. Then, together with Julia Coleman, Hunt extended the campaign to other school districts in the state.

== Founding ==
In 1879, Hunt addressed the WCTU's national convention on the subject of "Scientific Temperance Instruction," in which she argued for "thorough text-book study of Scientific Temperance in public schools as a preventive against intemperance." The following year, at the seventh convention of the U.S. WCTU, the Department of Scientific Temperance Instruction in Schools and Colleges was established, and Mary Hunt was elected the founding national superintendent.

== Promoting Compulsory Curriculum ==
After experiencing some missteps in her campaign to bring about temperance instruction by persuading local school boards to have it taught, Hunt developed the strategy of having WCTU members pressure state legislators to mandate temperance instruction and to promote the nomination and candidacy of pro-temperance candidates in election years. Her highly organized members campaigned for temperance candidates, developed letter writing campaigns, obtained temperance endorsements from leading citizens, presented legislators with petitions, and packed open hearings on proposed bills. The technique was effective.

By the turn of the 20th century, the Scientific Temperance Instruction movement directed by Hunt had proved to be highly successful. Virtually every state, the District of Columbia, and all United States possessions had strong legislation mandating that all students receive anti-alcohol education. The implementation of this legislation was closely monitored down to the classroom level by legions of determined and vigilant WCTU members throughout the nation.

The WCTU promoted compulsory temperance education so as to create "trained haters of alcohol to pour a whole Niagara of ballots upon the saloon." To this end Hunt required that textbooks which she approved "teach that alcohol is a dangerous and seductive poison; that fermentation turns beer and wine and cider from a food into poison; that a little liquor creates by its nature the appetite for more; and that degradation and crime result from alcohol." Publishers had difficulty selling textbooks that were not approved by Mary Hunt; therefore, they closely followed her guidelines for content.

Hunt shared the common temperance belief that drinking in moderation was undesirable. Therefore, books which she approved asserted that "To attempt to drink fermented liquors moderately has led to the hopeless ruin of untold thousands" and "It is the nature of alcohol to make drunkards." Central to Hunt’s approval was the absolute insistence that alcohol in any form and in any amount was a poison to the human system.

== Protest by Committee of Fifty ==
By the mid-1890s, the content of textbooks endorsed by the WCTU were increasingly criticized by leading scientists and educators. The Committee of Fifty for the Study of the Liquor Problem investigated the nature of alcohol education promoted by Mary Hunt and the Department of Scientific Temperance Instruction.

The committee believed that instruction should be based on facts so that students could form their own educated opinions. They "should not be taught that the drinking of a glass or two of wine by a grown-up person is very dangerous." This was diametrically opposed to the beliefs of Hunt, who referred to the enormous "harvest of death that might result from the universal teaching that the drinking of one or two glasses of wine is not 'very dangerous'" and asserted that "such teaching would be nothing less than crime."

After extensive investigation, the Committee of Fifty concluded that "under the name of 'Scientific Temperance Instruction' there has been grafted upon the public school system of nearly all our States an educational scheme relating to alcohol which is neither scientific, nor temperate, nor instructive."

Hunt prepared a Reply in which she charged the Committee with being prejudiced against abstinence instruction, accused it of grossly misrepresenting facts, and insisted that the WCTU-endorsed textbooks were completely accurate. She then had the Reply entered into the Congressional Record and distributed more than 100,000 copies.

== National Prohibition ==
When national prohibition went into effect in 1920, the WCTU actually promoted its temperance education efforts with even greater fervor to protect its hard-won gain. However, the repeal of prohibition in 1933 signaled the beginning of the end for scientific temperance instruction. In states and counties that chose to remain "dry" (maintain prohibition), students tended to continue receiving temperance instruction. The WCTU helped to ensure that temperance textbooks were available to meet the declining demand.

== See also ==
- Mary Hannah Hanchett Hunt
- Scientific Temperance Federation
- Woman's Christian Temperance Union
