= Wayne Wheeler =

American attorney and prohibitionist (1869–1927)

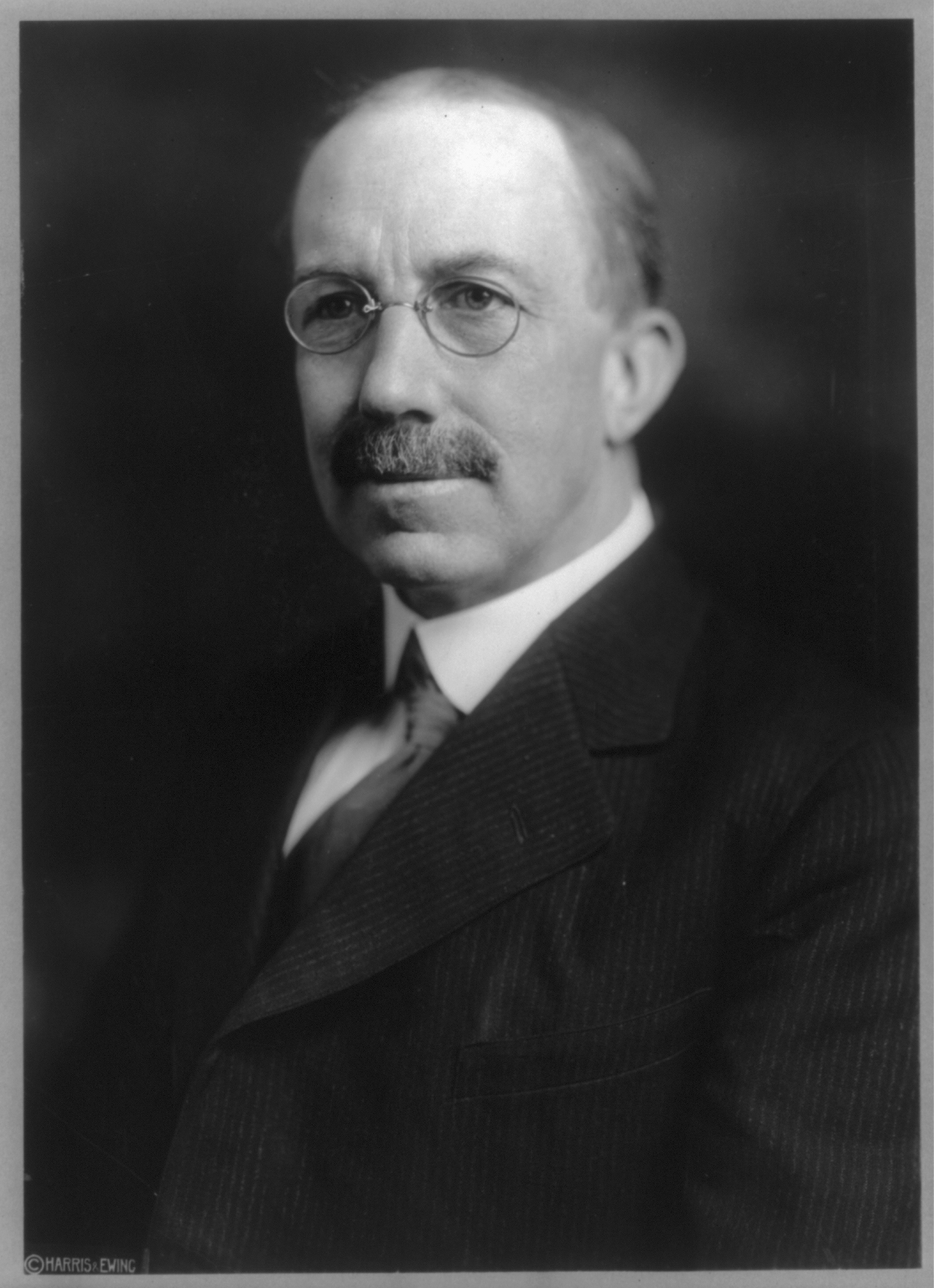
- Wheeler, c. 1920
- Born: Wayne Bidwell Wheeler; November 10, 1869; Brookfield Township, Trumbull County, Ohio, US
- Died: September 5, 1927 (aged 57); Battle Creek, Michigan, US
- Resting place: Green Lawn Cemetery
- Education: Oberlin College; Western Reserve University
- Occupations: Teacher; Attorney; Political organizer Lobbyist
- Known for: Prohibition advocate
- Political party: Republican
- Spouse: Ella Belle Candy (m. 1901–1927)
- Children: 3

Wayne Bidwell Wheeler (November 10, 1869 – September 5, 1927) was an American attorney and longtime leader of the Anti-Saloon League. The leading advocate of the prohibitionist movement in the late 1800s and early 1900s, he played a major role in the passage of the Eighteenth Amendment to the United States Constitution, which outlawed the manufacture, distribution, and sale of alcoholic beverages.

Wheeler was a native of Brookfield Township in Trumbull County, Ohio, where he was raised on his family's farm. A childhood accident caused by an intoxicated hired hand gave Wheeler a lifelong aversion to alcohol. He used the story later to recruit converts to the prohibition movement and to promote a prohibition amendment to the U.S. Constitution. Wheeler graduated from high school in Sharon, Pennsylvania, received his teaching qualification, and taught for two years before becoming a student at Oberlin College. After graduating in 1894, Wheeler became an organizer for the Anti-Saloon League. He earned his LL.B. degree from Western Reserve University in 1898. In 1902, Wheeler became a leader of the Anti-Saloon League, and perfected a system of single-issue pressure politics, including media campaigns and public demonstrations, to win enactment of laws limiting or banning the sale and consumption of alcohol.

Wheeler's career hit its high point with the passage of the Eighteenth Amendment and the Volstead Act in 1920. As enforcement of Prohibition became increasingly difficult, federal agencies resorted to draconian measures including poisoning alcohol to try to dissuade people from consuming it. Wheeler's refusal to compromise, for example by amending Prohibition measures to allow for consumption of beer, made him appear increasingly unreasonable. His influence began to wane, and he retired in 1927.

Soon after his retirement, Wheeler was beset by several tragedies. His wife was killed in an accidental kitchen fire, and his father-in-law had a fatal heart attack after trying unsuccessfully to aid her. Wheeler suffered from kidney disease, and died at a sanitarium in Battle Creek, Michigan, on September 5, 1927.

== Early life and education ==
Wheeler was born on November 10, 1869, in Brookfield Township, Trumbull County, Ohio, to Mary Ursula Hutchinson Wheeler and Joseph Wheeler. His nondrinking stance started while working on the farm, when an intoxicated hired hand accidentally stabbed Wheeler with a hayfork. As an adult, Wheeler turned the incident into an effective anecdote that supported his position on banning the use of alcohol.

Upon graduation from high school, Wheeler taught school for two years, and in 1890, he enrolled at Oberlin College. To pay his tuition, Wheeler worked as a waiter, dormitory janitor, summer school teacher, and salesman.

== Early career ==
Wheeler was studying at Oberlin when Howard Hyde Russell offered him a job with the newly-organized Anti-Saloon League (ASL), saying later that he saw in Wheeler "a loving, spirited self-sacrificing soul who yearns to help the other fellow."

After graduating in 1894, Wheeler accepted Russell's job offer and became a field organizer for the ASL. Wheeler studied law while working for the ASL, and in 1898, he earned his LL.B. degree from Western Reserve University.

Wheeler's background in teaching and law enabled him to become a skilled organizer and debater, and after receiving his law degree, he was appointed head of the ASL's legal office, where he was responsible for initiating numerous lawsuits in support of regulating the production, sale, and consumption of alcohol.

== Continued career ==
In 1903, Wheeler became acting superintendent of the Ohio ASL and its full-time executive director, and in 1904, he was appointed to the post permanently. Wheeler advocated for prohibitionists to enforce laws strictly and unsympathetically, rather than attempting to curb alcohol consumption through treatment and education.

To that end, Wheeler and the ASL campaigned against Myron T. Herrick, who ran for re-election as Governor of Ohio in 1906. Herrick was a Republican and a conservative and supported a local option bill backed by the ASL but had agreed to some modifications to ensure passage. For his willingness to compromise, the ASL decreed that Herrick was not sufficiently in favor of prohibition and backed his opponent, the Democrat John M. Pattison, a temperance advocate. Pattison won, a result that marked the first significant victory for the Anti-Saloon League.

== Wheelerism ==
As the ASL's leader, Wheeler developed a method of activism that came to be called "Wheelerism," which focused on only one issue, and relied heavily on mass media to persuade politicians that there was widespread public support for the ASL's position. Wheelerism also included direct persuasion of those in power with tactics such as threats to withdraw campaign endorsements; endorsing and financing opponents; and revealing embarrassing information to obtain support for restrictions on the liquor trade.

== Years of power ==
Under Wheeler's leadership, the League focused entirely on the goal of achieving Prohibition. Unlike Frances Willard's Women's Christian Temperance Union, which dealt with many humanitarian issues, Wheeler felt that the only way to challenge the political influence of the beer, wine, and liquor makers successfully was to focus on achieving national prohibition by any means necessary.

Wheeler was able to elect politicians by encouraging the prohibitionists of both political parties to vote for candidates who supported the cause, regardless of party affiliation or position on other issues. Unlike other temperance groups, the ASL recognized the supremacy of the two-party system and worked with Democrats and Republicans, rather than the small ineffective Prohibition Party.

During the Wheeler years, the ASL elected numerous statewide officials, state legislators, and members of Congress. Its influence was felt on issues related to the sale and consumption of alcohol, including Congress's override of President William Howard Taft's veto of the Webb-Kenyon Act. The Act outlawed the transport of alcoholic beverages into states with prohibition laws, even small amounts for individual consumption. Taft argued that it was a states' rights issue, which did not require federal legislation. Congress disagreed, and the override votes in the US Senate and the US House of Representatives were completely unexpected and gave tangible proof of how powerful the ASL and other prohibitionists had become.

The override was followed by enactment of a national income tax authorized by the recently ratified Sixteenth Amendment. Until 1913, the federal government had depended on liquor taxes for as much as 40 percent of its annual revenue, but with the income tax replacing the liquor tax, that argument evaporated.

The ASL was thus positioned to achieve its primary goal, a constitutional amendment imposing prohibition.

== Eighteenth Amendment ==
As the prohibition movement's power continued to grow, Wheeler adroitly expanded the influence of the ASL through timely alliances with the advocates of other causes. One of his primary successes was supporting the women's suffrage movement in the belief that women would support ASL candidates at the ballot box. Because Wheeler supported the suffragists in their quest for a Constitutional amendment giving women the right to vote, they supported his efforts to obtain passage of a prohibition amendment. After decades of trying, in 1919 the ASL was able to obtain passage of the Eighteenth Amendment, which banned the production, transport, and sale of alcoholic beverages. The Nineteenth Amendment, adopted in 1920, provided women the right to vote.

== Prohibition enforcement ==
In the early 1920s, Wheeler's power was at its zenith. He was involved in drafting the Volstead Act, which provided the means for enforcing the prohibition amendment, as well as federal and state laws that refined prohibition's enforcement mechanisms. Candidates who ran with ASL backing controlled state governments and the U.S. Congress. In addition, Wheeler's influence extended to the Bureau of Prohibition, which gave him control of a patronage operation that hired the enforcement officers responsible for identifying and apprehending illicit alcohol makers, distributors and sellers.

== Decline of influence ==
The desire for alcohol among Americans did not dissipate as Wheeler had envisioned would occur after passage of the Eighteenth Amendment, and Prohibition became increasingly unenforceable. By 1926, Wheeler was being criticized by members of Congress, who questioned the ASL's financing and campaign contributions.

A turning point came when the Prohibition Bureau began adding poison to industrial alcohol to prevent its use in beverages. Wheeler opposed the use of non-fatal substances such as soap, and argued that fatal poisons in industrial alcohol was an acceptable measure because the government was under no obligation to protect the lives of its citizens if they broke the law by consuming alcohol. Between 10,000 and 50,000 deaths resulted, and Wheeler argued that in essence the victims had committed suicide. His callous attitude and refusal to compromise on enforcing prohibition began to change the way the public viewed the Anti-Saloon League, and Wheeler's influence began to wane.

== Death ==
Wheeler retired shortly after the public outcry over the poisoning deaths, but he continued to fight for prohibition. Wheeler's wife was burned to death on August 14, 1927, in a cooking accident at the couple's house in Little Point Sable, Michigan, and her father suffered a fatal heart attack after trying to come to her aid. On September 5, aged 57, Wheeler died of kidney disease while seeking treatment at Battle Creek Sanitarium. He was buried at Green Lawn Cemetery in Columbus, Ohio.

== Legacy ==
Wheeler is not widely known today, but historians familiar with the Prohibition era regard him as playing an important role in the passage of the Eighteenth Amendment. His use of pressure politics, his expertise in building the Prohibition movement, and the time and effort that he contributed to the ASL were the keys to the success of the ASL and the Prohibition movement as a whole.

== Sources ==
- Hanson David. "Wheeler, Wayne Bidwell" American National Biography Online, Feb. 2000.
- Okrent, Daniel. Last Call: The Rise and Fall of Prohibition. New York, NY:Simon and Schuster, Inc., 2010.
- Anti-Saloon League. The Brewers and Texas Politics. Vols. 1 and 2. San Antonio: Passing Show Printing, 1916.
- _______. Proceedings of the Fifteenth Annual Convention of the Anti-Saloon League of America. Westerville, OH: 1913.
- Steuart, Justin. Wayne Wheeler, Dry Boss. Westport, CT: Greenwood, 1971.
- Hanson, David. Wayne Bidwell Wheeler. In: Garraty, John A. and Cames, Mark C. (eds.) American National Biography. N.Y.: Praeger, 1999, vol. 23, pp. 144–145.
