= Ernest Cherrington =

American temperance journalist (1877–1950)

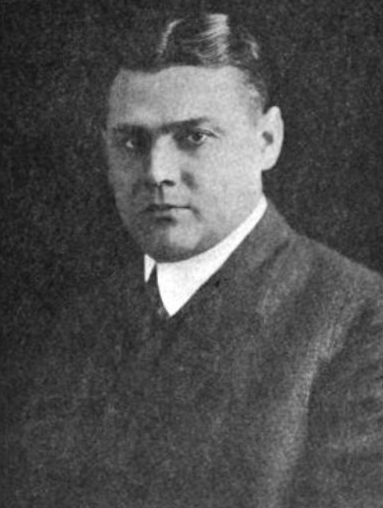
- Cherrington in 1922 publication
- Born: Ernest Hurst Cherrington; November 24, 1877; Hamden, Ohio, U.S.
- Died: March 13, 1950 (aged 72); Columbus, Ohio, U.S.
- Education: Ohio Wesleyan University
- Occupation: Journalist

Ernest Hurst Cherrington (November 24, 1877 – March 13, 1950) was a leading temperance journalist. He became active in the Anti-Saloon League and was appointed editor of the organization's publishing house, the American Issue Publishing Company. He edited and contributed to the writing of The Standard Encyclopedia of the Alcohol Problem, a comprehensive six-volume work. In addition, he was active in establishing the World League Against Alcoholism.

Cherrington favored education over the coercive use of force to bring about Prohibition and sobriety, a position in direct opposition to that of Anti-Saloon leader Wayne Wheeler. Following a number of name changes, the league is now the American Council on Alcohol Problems.

Cherrington remained active in temperance activities until shortly before his death in 1950.

== Early life ==
Cherrington was born on November 24, 1877, in Hamden, Ohio. He went to college at Ohio Wesleyan University and then became a teacher. Cherrington was against the consumption of alcohol and the effects it had on the declining mortality of his fellow Americans. He then decided to leave teaching to become newspaper reporter and critic of alcohol consumption.

== Ohio Anti-Saloon League ==
In 1901, Cherrington joined the Ohio Anti-Saloon League, who was the leading organization lobbying the prohibition in the United States in the early 20th century. Cherrington would then climb the ladders within the organization and find himself becoming the assistant superintendent of the Ohio Anti-Saloon League, and then finally being promoted to the superintendent of the Washington Anti-Saloon League.

== Later life ==
Cherrington died from cancer in Columbus, Ohio, on March 13, 1950.

== Publications ==
- History of the Anti-Saloon League. 1913.
- The Evolution of Prohibition in the United States of America. 1920.
- America and the World Liquor Problem. Westerville, OH: American Issue Publishing Co., 1922.
- A World Prohibition Crisis. 1926.
