= Anti-Saloon League =

American organization lobbying for prohibition

- Successor: American Council on Addiction and Alcohol Problems
- Formation: 1893
- Founded at: Oberlin, Ohio
- Type: Nonprofit
- Legal status: Defunct
- Purpose: Temperance activism
- Leader: Wayne Wheeler

The Anti-Saloon League, now known as the American Council on Addiction and Alcohol Problems, is an organization of the temperance movement in the United States.

Founded in 1893 in Oberlin, Ohio, it was a key component of the Progressive Era and was strongest in the South and rural North, drawing support from Protestant ministers and their congregations, especially Methodists, Baptists, Disciples and Congregationalists. It concentrated on legislation, and cared about how legislators had voted, not whether they drank or not. Established initially as an Ohio state society, its influence spread rapidly. In 1895, it became a national organization and quickly rose to become the most powerful prohibition lobby in America, overshadowing the older Woman's Christian Temperance Union and the Prohibition Party. Its triumph was nationwide prohibition locked into the Constitution with passage of the 18th Amendment in 1919. It was decisively defeated when Prohibition was repealed in 1933.

The organization continued – albeit with multiple name changes – and as of 2016 is known as the American Council on Addiction and Alcohol Problems (ACAAP). It remains active in lobbying to restrict alcohol advertising and promoting temperance. Its periodical is titled The American Issue. Member organizations of the American Council on Addiction and Alcohol Problems include "state temperance organizations, national Christian denominations and other fraternal organizations that support ACAAP's philosophy of abstinence".

== Organizational structure and operation ==
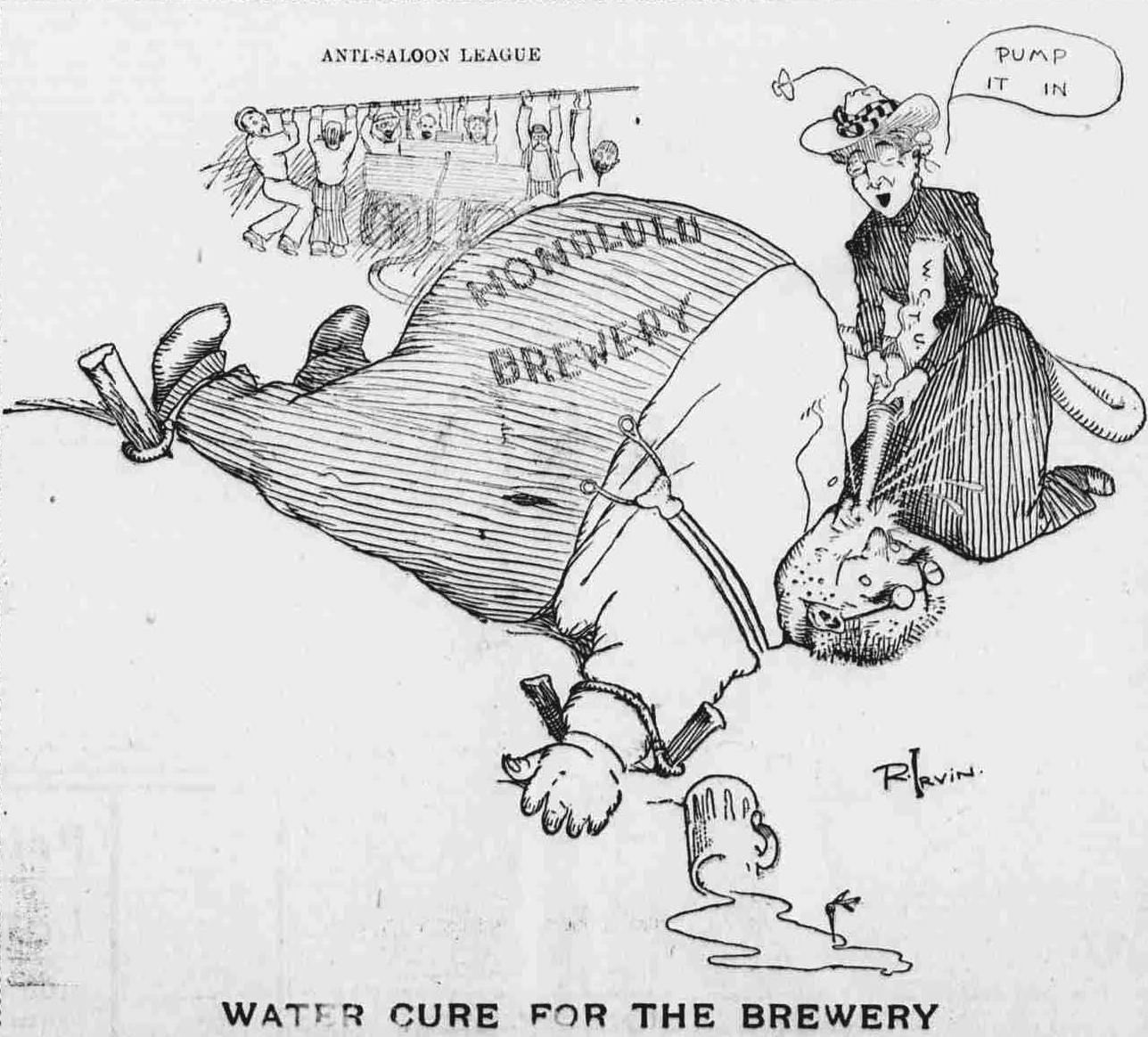
This 1902 illustration from the Hawaiian Gazette newspaper humorously illustrates the Anti-Saloon League and the Woman's Christian Temperance Union's campaign against the producers and sellers of beers in Hawaii.

The league was the first modern pressure group in the United States organized around one issue. Unlike earlier popular movements, it utilized bureaucratic methods learned from business to build a strong organization. The league's founder and first leader, Howard Hyde Russell, believed that the best leadership was selected, not elected. Russell built from the bottom up, shaping local leagues and raising the most promising young men to leadership at the local and state levels. This organizational strategy reinvigorated the temperance movement. Publicity was handled by Edward Young Clarke and Mary Elizabeth Tyler of the Southern Publicity Association.

In 1909 the league moved its national headquarters from Washington to Westerville, Ohio, which had a reputation for supporting temperance. The American Issue Publishing House, the publishing arm of the league, was also in Westerville. Ernest Cherrington headed the company. It printed so many leaflets – over 40 tons of mail per month – that Westerville was the smallest town to have a first class post office.

From 1948 until 1950 the group was named the Temperance League, from 1950 to 1964 the National Temperance League, and from 1964 to 2015 the American Council on Alcohol Problems; in 2016 the group rebranded as the American Council on Addiction and Alcohol Problems (ACAAP). As of 2020 the organization continues its "neo-prohibitionist agenda", with the addition of "other drugs" such as opioids. ACAAP is headquartered in Birmingham, Alabama. A museum about the Anti-Saloon League is at the Westerville Public Library.

== Pressure politics ==
The most prominent leader was Wayne Wheeler, although both Cherrington and William E. "Pussyfoot" Johnson were also highly influential and powerful. The league used pressure politics in legislative politics, which it is credited with developing. Howard Ball has written that the Ku Klux Klan and the Anti-Saloon League were both powerful pressure groups in Birmingham, Alabama, during the Post-World War I period. A local newspaper editor at the time writes "In Alabama, it is hard to tell where the Anti-Saloon League ends and the Klan begins". During the May 1928 primary in Alabama, the League joined with Klansmen and members of the Woman's Christian Temperance Union. When an Alabama state senator proposed an anti-masking statute "to emasculate the order's ability to terrorize people", lobbying led by J. Bib Mills, the superintendent of the Alabama Anti-Saloon League, ensured that the bill failed.

When it came to fighting “wet” candidates, especially candidates such as Al Smith in the presidential election of 1928, the League was less effective because its audience was already Republican.

== National constitutional amendment ==
The League used a multi-tiered approach in its attempts to secure a dry (prohibition) nation through national legislation and congressional hearings, the Scientific Temperance Federation, and its American Issue Publishing Company. The League also used emotion based on patriotism, efficiency and anti-German sentiment in World War I. The activists saw themselves as preachers fulfilling their religious duty of eliminating liquor in America. As it tried to mobilize public opinion in favor of a dry, saloonless nation, the League invented many of the modern techniques of public relations.

== Local work ==
The League lobbied at all levels of government for legislation to prohibit the manufacture or import of spirits, beer and wine. Ministers had launched several efforts to close Arizona saloons after the 1906 creation of League chapters in Yuma, Tucson, and Phoenix. A League organizer from New York arrived in 1909, but the Phoenix chapter was stymied by local-option elections, whereby local areas could decide whether to allow saloons. League members pressured local police to take licenses from establishments that violated closing hours or served women and minors, and they provided witnesses to testify about these violations. One witness was Frank Shindelbower, a juvenile from a poor family, who testified that several saloons had sold him liquor; as a result those saloons lost their licenses. However, owners discovered that Shindelbower had perjured himself, and he was imprisoned. After the Arizona Gazette and other newspapers pictured Shindelbower as the innocent tool of the Anti-Saloon League, he was pardoned.

== State operations ==
At the state level, the League had mixed results, usually doing best in rural and Southern states. It made little headway in larger cities or among liturgical church members such as Catholics, Jews, Episcopalians and German Lutherans. Pegram (1990) explains its success in Illinois under William Hamilton Anderson. From 1900 and 1905, the League worked to obtain a local option referendum law and became an official church federation. Local Option was passed in 1907 and, by 1910, 40 of Illinois's 102 counties and 1,059 of the state's townships and precincts had become dry, including some Protestant areas around Chicago. Despite these successes, after the Prohibition amendment was ratified in 1919, social problems ignored by the League – such as organized crime – undermined the public influence of the single-issue pressure group, and it faded in importance. Pegram (1997) uses the League's failure in Maryland to explore the relationship between Southern Progressivism and national progressivism. William H. Anderson was the League's Maryland leader from 1907 to 1914, but he was unable to adapt to local conditions, such as the large German element. The League failed to ally with local political bosses and attacked the Democratic Party. In Maryland, as in the rest of the South, Pegram concludes, traditional religious, political, and racial concerns constrained reform movements even as they converted Southerners to the new national politics of federal intervention and interest-group competition.

William M. Forgrave was superintendent of the Massachusetts Anti-Saloon League from 1923 to 1928. In his first year as leader, the statewide referendum on the state's liquor enforcement code was passed by a majority of 8,000 votes. The same referendum had been defeated by 103,000 votes two years earlier. In 1928, the Massachusetts House of Representatives voted 97 to 93 to censure him and strip him of his right to act as a legislative agent after he made unsubstantiated allegations the Massachusetts General Court held a "wild party" and gave away liquor confiscated by the Massachusetts Department of Public Safety. The Senate rejected the amendment because Forgrave had censured without a hearing. He resigned as superintendent on November 27, 1928, due to his impending divorce.

== Post-1928 ==
Unable to cope with the failures of prohibition after 1928, especially bootlegging and organized crime as well as reduced government revenue, the League failed to counter the repeal forces. Led by prominent Democrats, Franklin D. Roosevelt handily won the U.S. presidency election in 1932 on a wet platform. A constitutional amendment passed in 1933 to repeal the 18th Amendment, and the League lost much of its former influence afterwards.

As of 2016, the organization remains active in lobbying to restrict alcohol advertising and promoting temperance. It additionally aims to reduce alcohol consumption by Americans. Member organizations of the American Council on Addiction and Alcohol Problems include "state temperance organizations, national Christian denominations and other fraternal organizations that support ACAAP's philosophy of abstinence".

== See also ==
- Board of Temperance Strategy
- Index of drinking establishment–related articles
- Purley Baker
- List of Temperance organizations
- Teetotalism
