= Lincoln–Lee Legion =

The Lincoln–Lee Legion was established by Anti-Saloon League-founder Howard Hyde Russell in 1903 to promote the signing of abstinence pledges by children. The organization was originally called the Lincoln League, named after Abraham Lincoln. However, in 1912 it was renamed the Lincoln–Lee Legion, adding a reference to Robert E. Lee in order to make it more appealing to southern children and their parents.

The pledge called for a lifetime commitment to abstain from alcoholic beverages: "Whereas, the use of intoxicating liquors as a beverage is productive of pauperism, degradation and crime; and believing it our duty to discourage that which produces more evil than good, we therefore pledge ourselves to abstain from the use of intoxicating liquors as a beverage".

Pledge signing drives were heavily promoted at churches, Sunday schools, and temperance meetings. Girls who signed the pledge were called "Willards," after Frances Willard of the Women's Christian Temperance Union. Northern boys were called "Lincolns" and southern boys became "Lees." By 1925, over five million children had signed the total abstinence pledge cards.
