= Scientific Temperance Federation =

The Scientific Temperance Federation was founded in 1906 upon the death of Mary Hunt, head of the Women's Christian Temperance Union's Department of Scientific Temperance Instruction.

Mrs. Hunt had avoided accusations that she profited from her volunteer work by signing over to the Scientific Temperance Association the royalties from the temperance textbooks she wrote and edited for the WCTU. That association, which consisted of Mary Hunt, her pastor, and a few of her friends, used its income to maintain the national headquarters of the Department of Scientific Instruction. That building was also the very large home of Mrs. Hunt.

Upon her death, this arrangement clouded ownership of her estate, which led to the creation of the Scientific Temperance Foundation. Mrs. Hunt's personal secretary, Cora Stoddard, headed the new organization. Because of the substantial fortune she had amassed in promoting compulsory temperance education, and the tens of millions of textbooks this required, the Scientific Temperance Federation was able to engage in a wide variety of activities to promote the temperance movement and prohibition. A major nation-wide project was an innovative "Education on Wheels" project that took temperance education directly to people at their homes and farms.

With the repeal of prohibition and the decline of the temperance movement, the Federation joined the Temperance Education Foundation in 1933.

== Sources ==
- Scientific Temperance Federation. Westerville (Ohio) Public Library. Papers of the Anti-Saloon League.
