= List of covers of Time magazine (1920s) =

This is a list of people and other topics appearing on the cover of Time magazine in the 1920s. Time was first published in 1923. As Time became established as one of the United States' leading news magazines, an appearance on the cover of Time became an indicator of notability, fame or notoriety. Such features were accompanied by articles.

For other decades, see List of covers of Time magazine.

== 1923 ==
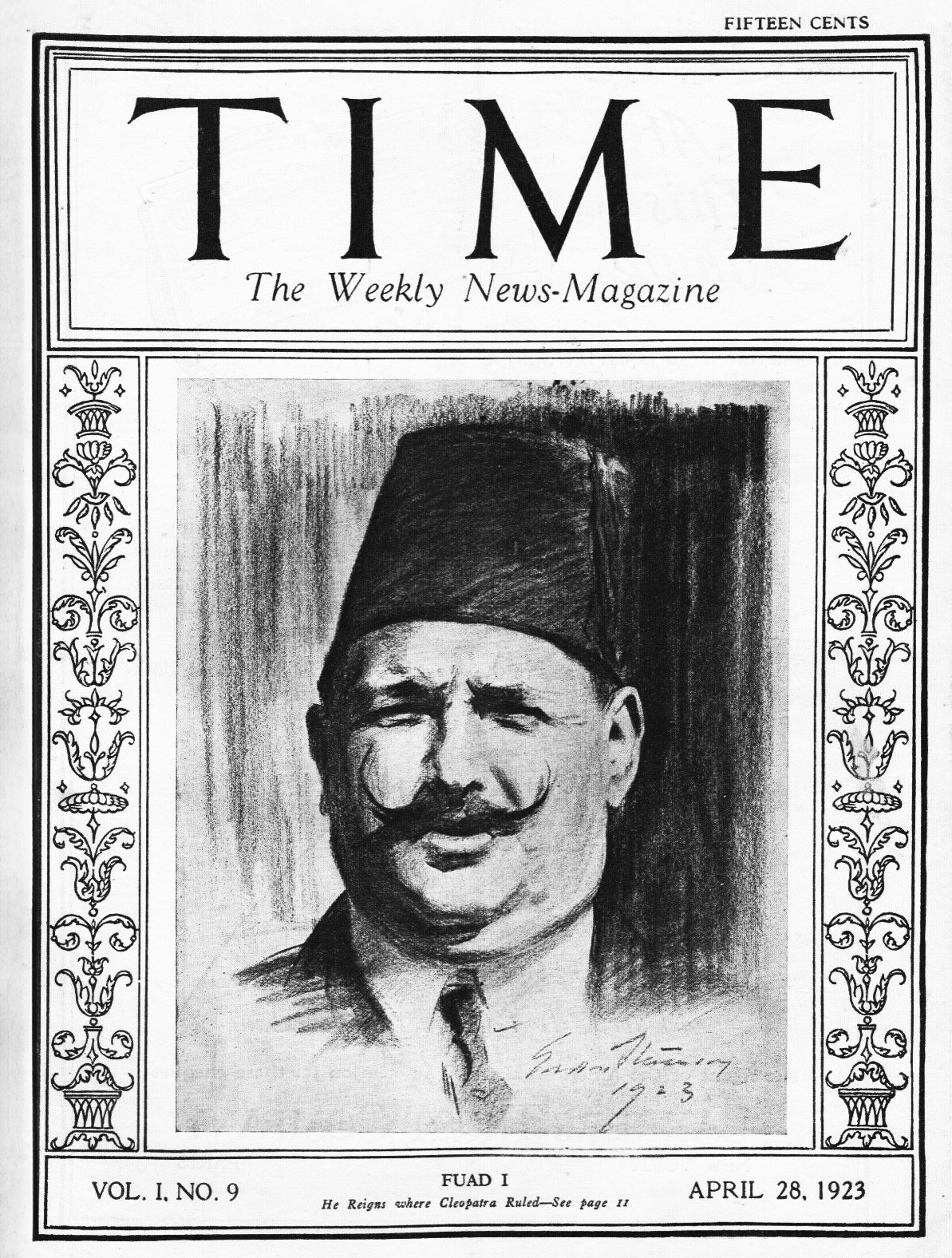
Cover for April 28, 1923, with Fuad I of Egypt

- March 3 – Joseph G. Cannon
- March 10 – Warren G. Harding
- March 17 – Hugo Stinnes
- March 24 – Mustafa Kemal Atatürk
- March 31 – Stephen Sanford
- April 7 – Joseph Conrad
- April 14 – Winston Churchill
- April 21 – Samuel M. Vauclain
- April 28 – Fuad I of Egypt
- May 5 – James M. Beck
- May 12 – John Barton Payne
- May 19 – René Viviani
- May 28 – Franklin D. Roosevelt
- June 4 – John L. Lewis
- June 11 – Herbert L. Pratt
- June 18 – Burton K. Wheeler
- June 25 – Edward M. House
- July 2 – Andrew Mellon
- July 9 – Mason M. Patrick
- July 16 – James Couzens
- July 23 – Roy Asa Haynes
- July 30 – Eleanora Duse
- August 6 – Benito Mussolini
- August 13 – Samuel George Blythe
- August 20 – F. E. Smith, 1st Earl of Birkenhead
- August 27 – Frederick G. Banting
- September 3 – David Lloyd George
- September 10 – Jack Dempsey
- September 17 – Israel Zangwill
- September 24 – J. P. Morgan Jr.
- October 1 – Samuel Gompers
- October 8 – H. H. Asquith
- October 15 – Frank O. Lowden
- October 22 – John W. Weeks
- October 29 – Roy Chapman Andrews
- November 5 – Giulio Gatti-Casazza
- November 12 – Woodrow Wilson
- November 19 – Erich Ludendorff
- November 26 – Hugh S. Gibson
- December 3 – Robert M. La Follette Sr.
- December 10 – Albert Baird Cummins
- December 17 – Anton Lang
- December 24 – George Bernard Shaw
- December 31 – Anthony H. G. Fokker

== 1924 ==
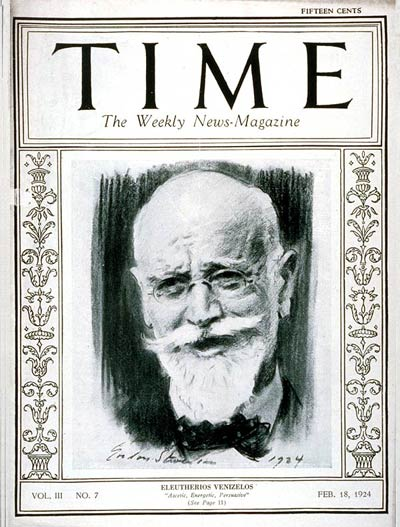
Cover for February 18, 1924, with Eleutherios Venizelos

- January 7 – William G. McAdoo
- January 14 – Bishop William Lawrence
- January 21 – Henry Cabot Lodge
- January 28 – Herbert B. Swope
- February 4 – Edward Eberle
- February 11 – John Hessin Clarke
- February 18 – Eleutherios Venizelos
- February 25 – Bernard M. Baruch
- March 3 – Reginald McKenna
- March 10 – Warren Stanford Stone
- March 17 – Eugene O'Neill
- March 24 – Raymond Poincaré
- March 31 – George Eastman
- April 7 – King George V
- April 14 – George Fisher Baker
- April 21 – Lou Henry Hoover
- April 28 – Gelasio Caetani
- May 5 – William E. Borah
- May 12 – Homer Saint-Gaudens
- May 19 – Henry Seidel Canby
- May 26 – Sir James Craig
- June 2 – Alfred von Tirpitz
- June 9 – Carter Glass
- June 16 – Pope Pius XI
- June 23 – Hiram W. Evans
- June 30 – William Howard Taft
- July 7 – James Stillman Rockefeller
- July 14 – Alexey Rykov
- July 21 – Gaston Doumergue
- July 28 – William Sproule
- August 4 – Queen Marie
- August 11 – John J. Pershing
- August 18 – Ramsay MacDonald
- August 25 – Edith Cummings
- September 1 – Adolph S. Ochs
- September 8 – Wu Pei-fu
- September 15 – Seymour Parker Gilbert
- September 22 – Leo H. Baekeland
- September 29 – Hiram Johnson
- October 6 – William Allen White
- October 13 – Glenn H. Curtiss
- October 20 – Sir Patrick Hastings
- October 27 – Sigmund Freud
- November 3 – Sir Thomas Lipton
- November 10 – Ethel Barrymore
- November 17 – Frederick Huntington Gillett
- November 24 – William R. Inge
- December 1 – Chauncey M. Depew
- December 8 – Plutarco Calles
- December 15 – Dwight F. Davis
- December 22 – King Alfonso XIII
- December 29 – Charles Evans Hughes

== 1925 ==
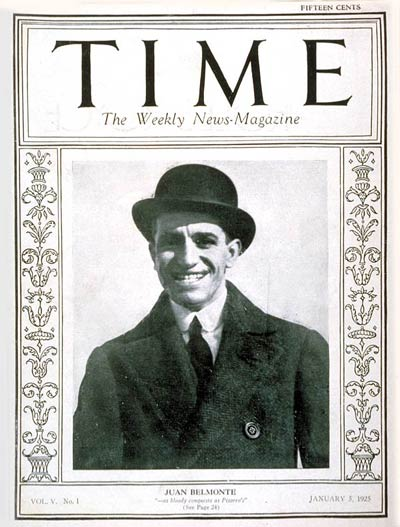
Cover for January 5, 1925, with Juan Belmonte

- January 5 – Juan Belmonte
- January 12 – Albert, Duke of York
- January 19 – John D. Rockefeller Jr.
- January 26 – Charles B. Warren
- February 2 – Fritz Kreisler
- February 9 – William Lyon Mackenzie King
- February 16 – Harry S. New
- February 23 – Owen D. Young
- March 2 – Amy Lowell
- March 9 – Nicholas Longworth
- March 16 – Marshal Ferdinand Foch
- March 23 – Edvard Beneš
- March 30 – George Harold Sisler
- April 6 – John Ringling
- April 13 – Arthur Balfour
- April 20 – Walter P. Chrysler
- April 27 – James B. Hertzog
- May 4 – Thomas J. Walsh
- May 11 – Winston Churchill
- May 18 – Leon Trotsky
- May 25 – Thomas A. Edison
- June 1 – Richard Swann Lull
- June 8 – Miguel Primo de Rivera
- June 15 – Victor Emmanuel III of Italy
- June 22 – Charles Horace Mayo
- June 29 – Theodore E. Burton
- July 6 – Charlie Chaplin
- July 13 – Alfred E. Smith
- July 20 – George Gershwin
- July 27 – Henry Ford
- August 3 – Lincoln C. Andrews
- August 10 – Stanley Baldwin
- August 17 – Abd el-Krim
- August 24 – F. Trubee Davison
- August 31 – Bobby Jones
- September 7 – Joseph Caillaux
- September 14 – Zachary Lansdowne
- September 21 – Harry Emerson Fosdick
- September 28 – Frank B. Kellogg
- October 5 – Red Grange
- October 12 – Dwight W. Morrow
- October 19 – Louis D. Brandeis
- October 26 – Admiral William S. Sims
- November 2 – Otto H. Kahn
- November 9 – Paul Painlevé & Aristide Briand
- November 16 – Herbert Hoover
- November 23 – Gifford Pinchot
- November 30 – Austen Chamberlain
- December 7 – José R. Capablanca
- December 14 – Charles G. Dawes
- December 21 – Booth Tarkington
- December 28 – James Wadsworth Jr.

== 1926 ==
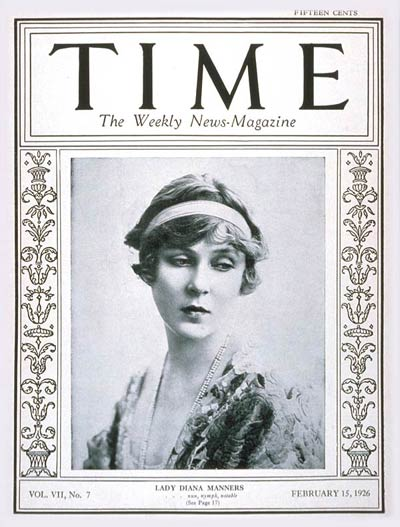
Cover for February 15, 1926, with Lady Diana Manners

- January 4 – Georges Clemenceau
- January 11 – Jimmy Walker
- January 18 – Arthur Capper
- January 25 – Arturo Toscanini
- February 1 – Henry Bérenger
- February 8 – Alfred Stearns
- February 15 – Lady Diana Manners
- February 22 – Ellen Browning Scripps
- March 1 – Marion N. Talley
- March 8 – Robert Todd Lincoln
- March 15 – Oliver Wendell Holmes Jr.
- March 22 – Paul von Hindenburg
- March 29 – Andrew J. Volstead
- April 5 – Alanson B. Houghton
- April 12 – Lord Irwin
- April 19 – Leonard Wood
- April 26 – Raquel Meller
- May 3 – King Haakon VII
- May 10 – John Hays Hammond
- May 17 – Philip Albright Small Franklin
- May 24 – Albert C. Ritchie
- May 31 – Cardinal Mundelein
- June 7 – Józef Piłsudski
- June 14 – Carrie Chapman Catt
- June 21 – A. Lawrence Lowell
- June 28 – Kaiser Wilhelm
- July 5 – Elbert Henry Gary
- July 12 – Benito Mussolini
- July 19 – Will Rogers
- July 26 – Helen Wills
- August 2 – Gaston Doumergue
- August 9 – George E. Brennan
- August 16 – Arthur Brisbane
- August 23 – René Fonck
- August 30 – Gene Tunney
- September 6 – Pietro Mascagni
- September 13 – Will H. Hays
- September 20 – H. G. Wells
- September 27 – Rudyard Kipling
- October 4 – William H. "Big Bill" Edwards
- October 11 – Ogden L. Mills
- October 18 – Elihu Root
- October 25 – George B. Harvey
- November 1 – Giulio Gatti-Casazza
- November 8 – Heihachiro Togo
- November 15 – Henry Sloane Coffin
- November 22 – Charles M. Schwab
- November 29 – Samuel Insull
- December 6 – Guglielmo Marconi
- December 13 – Ralph A. Cram
- December 20 – Charles Curtis
- December 27 – Alfred P. Sloan Jr.

== 1927 ==
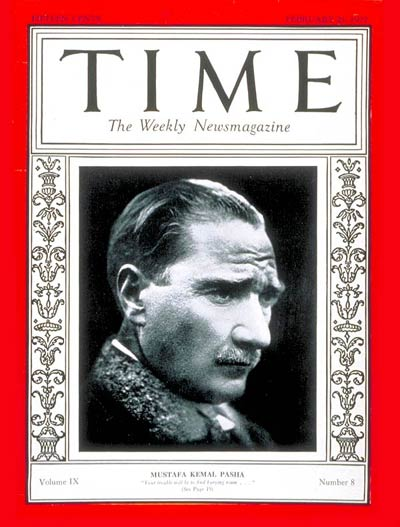
Cover for February 21, 1927, with Mustafa Kemal Atatürk

- January 3 – Leopold C. Amery
- January 10 – James J. Davis
- January 17 – Charles Copeland
- January 24 – Richard Strauss
- January 31 – Pierre S. du Pont
- February 7 – Alice Roosevelt Longworth
- February 14 – Mortimer L. Schiff
- February 21 – Mustafa Kemal Atatürk
- February 28 – Ray Lyman Wilbur
- March 7 – James A. Reed
- March 14 – Sinclair Lewis
- March 21 – Paul Claudel
- March 28 – Charles Dana Gibson
- April 4 – Chiang Kai-shek
- April 11 – Cornelius McGillicuddy
- April 18 – Nellie Melba
- April 25 – Robert Andrews Millikan
- May 2 – Michael Arlen
- May 9 – Charles Frederick Hughes
- May 16 – Julius Klein
- May 25 – André Tardieu
- May 30 – King George V & Queen Mary
- June 6 – James A. Farrell
- June 13 – John Joseph Kennedy
- June 20 – Smedley Butler
- June 27 – Nicholas Murray Butler & John McGraw
- July 4 – Giuseppe Mario Bellanca
- July 11 – Ion I. C. Brătianu
- July 18 – Hugh S. Gibson
- July 25 – Wallace Farrington
- August 1 – Michael of Romania
- August 8 – Prince Edward, Prince Henry & Prince George
- August 15 – William Randolph Hearst
- August 22 – Max Reinhardt
- August 29 – Charles Henry Brent
- September 5 – Devereux Milburn
- September 12 – E. Phillips Oppenheim
- September 19 – Roger Wolfe Kahn
- September 26 – Howard Paul Savage
- October 3 – Graham McNamee
- October 10 – William M. Butler
- October 17 – Nikita Balieff
- October 24 – Bishop Freeman
- October 31 – Alfred Hertz
- November 7 – Knute Rockne
- November 14 – Newton D. Baker
- November 21 – Leon Trotsky
- November 28 – Frank Orren Lowden
- December 5 – Geraldine Farrar
- December 12 – Robert M. La Follette Jr.
- December 19 – Aristide Briand
- December 26 – Stanley Baldwin

== 1928 ==
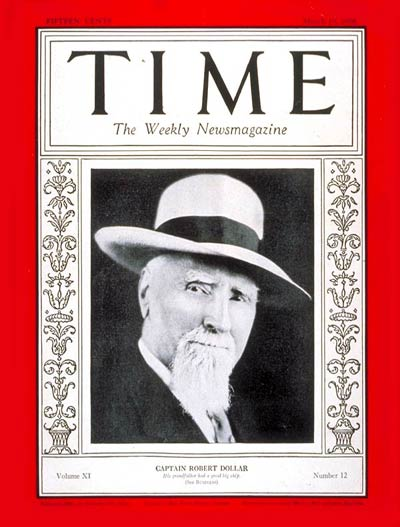
Cover for March 19, 1928, with Robert Dollar

- January 2 – Charles Lindbergh
- January 9 – Thomas Campbell
- January 16 – Calvin Coolidge
- January 23 – Ignacy Jan Paderewski
- January 30 – Myron T. Herrick
- February 6 – Vincent Astor
- February 13 – Eugene O'Neill
- February 20 – Charles Frederick Hughes
- February 27 – Baby Basset Hound
- March 5 – Tomáš Garrigue Masaryk
- March 12 – Bernard Baruch
- March 19 – Robert Dollar
- March 26 – Herbert Hoover
- April 2 – Amadeo Giannini
- April 9 – Harry F. Sinclair
- April 16 – George Eastman
- April 23 – Ruth Hanna McCormick
- April 30 – Alfred E. Smith
- May 7 – Robert McCormick & Joseph Medill Patterson
- May 14 – Florenz Ziegfeld
- May 21 – John D. Rockefeller
- May 28 – Andrew W. Mellon
- June 4 – John Dewey
- June 11 – Charles G. Dawes
- June 18 – Charles Curtis
- June 25 – Joseph Taylor Robinson
- July 2 – Feng Yuxiang
- July 9 – Rogers Hornsby
- July 16 – Julian Byng
- July 23 – King Alfonso XIII
- July 30 – Melvin A. Traylor
- August 6 – Albert I
- August 13 – Jean-Charles Worth
- August 20 – Richard Evelyn Byrd
- August 27 – Frank R. Kent
- September 3 – Jed Harris
- September 10 – Augustus John
- September 17 – Grace Coolidge
- September 24 – James William Good
- October 1 – Alexander Meiklejohn
- October 8 – William Howard Taft
- October 15 – Harry F. Byrd
- October 22 – Philip La Follette
- October 29 – Lord Melchett
- November 5 – The American people
- November 12 – Maria Jeritza
- November 19 – Emperor Hirohito
- November 26 – Mikhail Kalinin
- December 3 – Orville Wright
- December 10 – Arthur W. Cutten
- December 17 – Christ the Redeemer of the Andes
- December 24 – William Henry O'Connell
- December 31 – Henry Fairfield Osborn

== 1929 ==
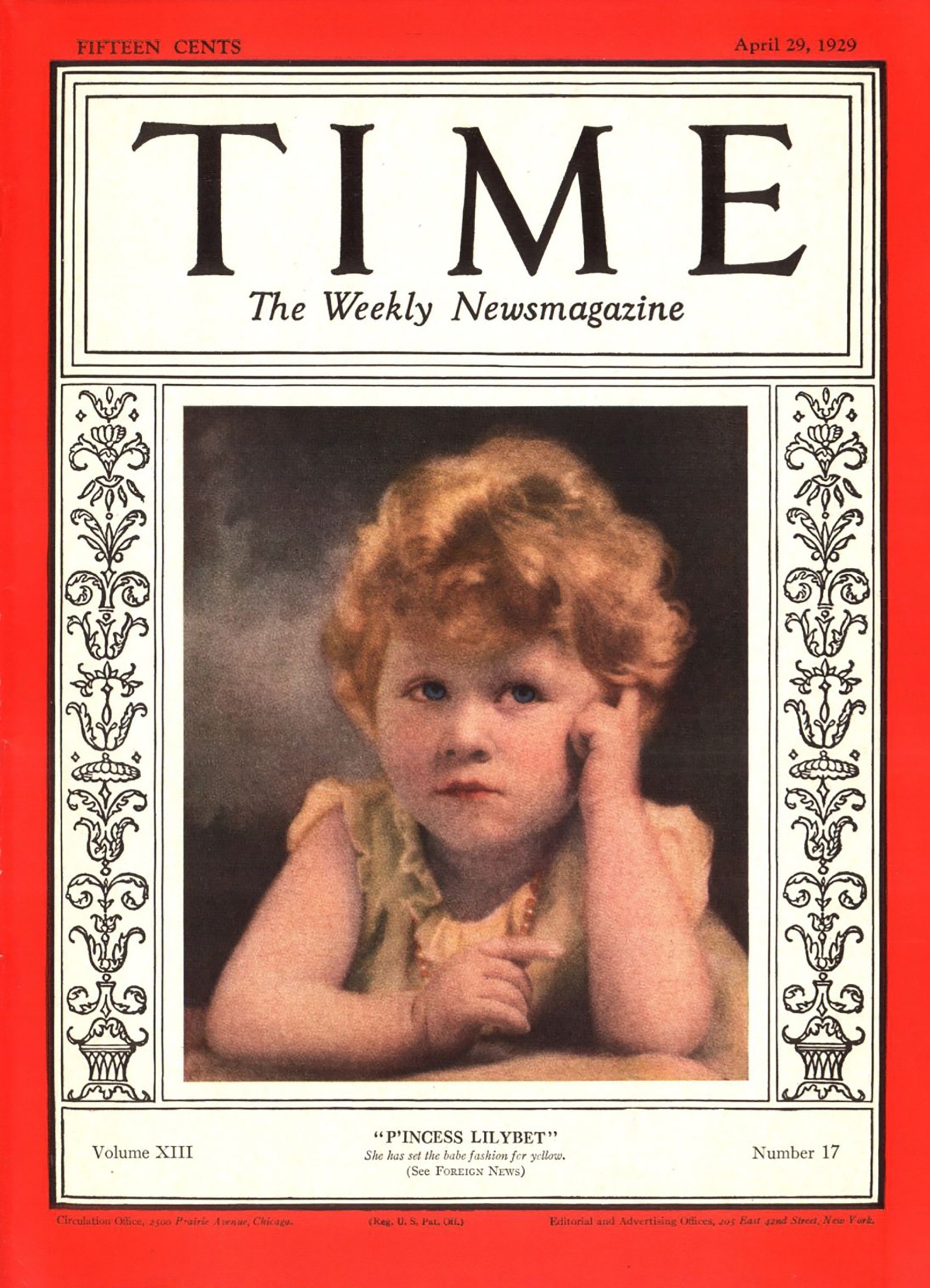
Cover for April 29, 1929, with Princess Elizabeth

- January 7 – Walter Chrysler
- January 14 – Adolph Zukor
- January 21 – James Simpson
- January 28 – Afranio do Amaral
- February 4 – Clarence C. Little
- February 11 – King Alexander
- February 18 – Albert Einstein
- February 25 – J. P. Morgan Jr.
- March 4 – Walter Hampden
- March 11 – Henry L. Stimson
- March 18 – Billy Barton
- March 25 – Crown Prince Olaf and Crown Princess Märtha
- April 1 – Prince Edward
- April 8 – Reed Smoot
- April 15 – Edgar Wallace
- April 22 – Myron C. Taylor
- April 29 – Princess Elizabeth
- May 6 – Harlan F. Stone
- May 13 – Lou Henry Hoover
- May 20 – Jimmy Walker
- May 27 – Edward Dean Adams
- June 3 – Francis Scott McBride
- June 10 – Oil State Governors (Billy Adams, Dan Moody, Frank Emerson, Clyde M. Reed, John Edward Erickson, William Judson Holloway, George Dern, Richard C. Dillon, Clement Calhoun Young)
- June 17 – Livingston Farrand
- June 24 – Max Schmeling
- July 1 – Helen Wills Moody
- July 8 – Lawrence M. Judd
- July 15 – David Sarnoff
- July 22 – Alvan Macauley
- July 29 – Jimmie Foxx
- August 5 – Arthur M. Hyde
- August 12 – Paul Shoup
- August 19 – Montagu C. Norman
- August 26 – Mabel Walker Willebrandt
- September 2 – James William Good
- September 9 – Graham Bethune Grosvenor
- September 16 – Hugo Eckener
- September 23 – Christian K. Cagle
- September 30 – Ina Claire
- October 7 – Ramsay MacDonald
- October 14 – William Wrigley Jr.
- October 21 – Harry Guggenheim
- October 28 – Ivar Kreuger
- November 4 – Samuel Insull
- November 11 – Thomas W. Lamont
- November 18 – Lewis Edward Lawes
- November 25 – Eva Le Gallienne
- December 2 – Robert Bridges
- December 9 – Walter C. Teagle
- December 16 – Nicholas Longworth
- December 23 – Wendell Cushing Neville
- December 30 – Pascual Ortiz Rubio

== See also ==
- Lists of covers of Time magazine

Lists of covers of Time magazine	Next
1920s	1930s
