= List of Muskingum University alumni =

This is a list of Muskingum University alumni.

== Government and politics ==
- T. Coleman du Pont, (class 1900), senator from Delaware
- Annie Glenn (class of 1941), civic leader; wife of John Glenn
- John Glenn (class of 1942), former astronaut, Democratic U.S. senator from Ohio (1975–1999), candidate for 1984 Democratic presidential nomination
- Warren G. Harding, president (via Muskingum's assumption of Ohio Central College)
- Earl R. Lewis (class of 1911), former Republican U.S. representative from Ohio, 1939–1940 and 1943–1948
- Sean Logan (class of 1988), current director of the Ohio Department of Natural Resources; former Columbiana County, Ohio commissioner
- Francis Scott McBride (class of 1895), leader of prohibition; longtime National Superintendent of the U.S. Anti-Saloon League
- John Willis Menard (via Iberia College and Ohio Central College), first African-American to address the U.S. House of Representatives, in 1869
- C. Ellis Moore (class of 1907), Republican U.S. representative from Ohio, 1919–1933
- Charles J. Pilliod, Jr. (class of 1941), United States ambassador to Mexico, 1986–1989
- Robert T. Secrest (class of 1926), Democratic U.S. representative from Ohio, 1933–1967
- Wilbur F. Simlik (class of 1943), major general in the Marine Corps
- Robert M. Warner (class of 1949), sixth archivist of the United States

== Entertainment ==
- Jack Hanna (class of 1969), former Columbus Zoo and Aquarium director; television personality
- Agnes Moorehead (class of 1923), Emmy Award-winning actress (Bewitched); member of the Delta Gamma Theta Sorority

== Arts ==
- David Budbill (class of 1962), poet, author and playwright
- Laurence Overmire (valedictorian, class of 1979), poet, author, actor, playwright
- Helen Camille Stanley (class of 1961) composer, violist

== Education ==
- Dennis D. Berkey (class of 1969), president, Worcester Polytechnic Institute
- William Rainey Harper (class of 1870), first president, University of Chicago
- Richard Pipes (class of 1944), professor emeritus of History, Harvard University
- William Oxley Thompson (class of 1870), president of Ohio State University and Miami University

== Business ==
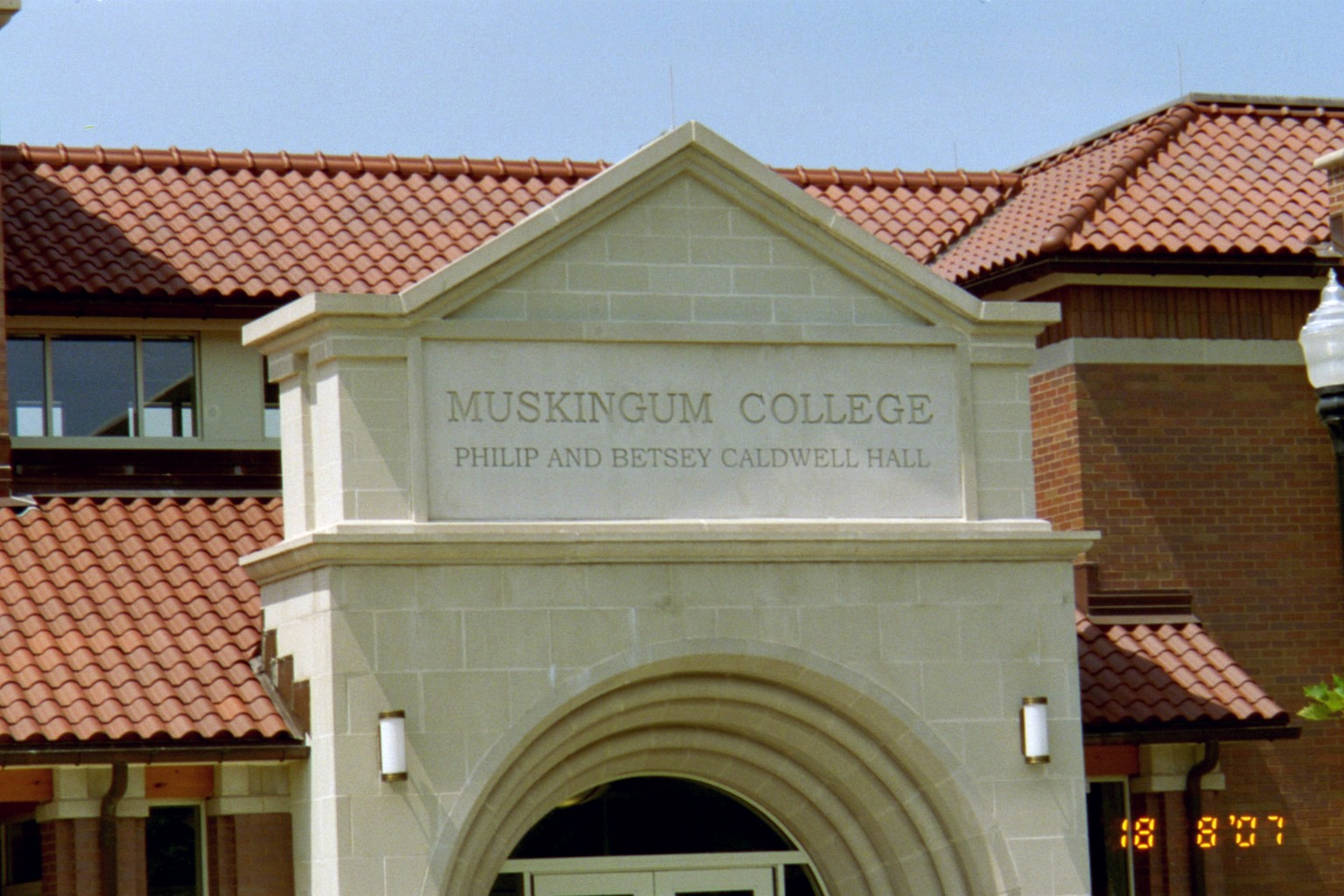
Muskingum's Caldwell Hall was named after alumnus Philip Caldwell and his wife Betsey.

- Philip Caldwell (class of 1940), retired CEO of Ford Motor Company

== Sports ==
- Darrell Hazell (class of 1986), wide receivers coach for the Minnesota Vikings of the NFL
- Jim Heacock (class of 1970), defensive coordinator and defensive line coach at Ohio State University
- Jon Heacock, defensive coordinator at Iowa State University
- Edgar "Ed" Sherman (class of 1936), legendary Muskingum head football coach for 22 years; College Football Hall of Fame inductee
- Tim Timmons, Major League Baseball umpire
- Brandon Todd, known as the 5'5" dunker, played for the 2001, 2002, and 2003 All-Ohio team with LeBron James; developed an athletic training program called "FlytRight"
- Tyson Veidt, associate head coach and linebackers coach at Iowa State University

== Science ==
- John Glenn (class of 1942), first American to orbit the Earth, became oldest man in space; is still the oldest person to orbit the Earth
- Charles E. Waring (class of 1931), chemistry professor at the University of Connecticut
