= Council of Thirteen =

The Council of Thirteen may refer to:

- The name of the ruling body of various fictional villainous species, such as:
  - the Yeerks, from the Animorphs book series
  - the Skaven, from the miniature wargame Warhammer Fantasy
  - The Guild of Calamitous Intent in the Venture Bros universe
- International Council of 13 Indigenous Grandmothers
