= Laurence Overmire =

American dramatist

- Born: August 17, 1957 (age 69); Rochester, New York, U.S.
- Education: Muskingum University, B.A., B.S. University of Minnesota, M.F.A.
- Occupations: Poet, author, actor, educator, genealogist
- Spouse: Nancy McDonald
- Website: www.laurenceovermire.com

Laurence Overmire (born August 17, 1957) is an American poet, author, actor, educator, genealogist, peace activist, civil rights, human rights, and animal rights advocate and environmentalist.

He is the author of The One Idea That Saves The World: A Call to Conscience and A Call to Action (2012), a philosophical prose work that deals with the spiritual and moral issues that confront humankind in the 21st century. The book has been endorsed by Thom Hartmann, Bill McKibben, Raffi Cavoukian, The World Business Academy, Mona Polacca of the International Council of 13 Indigenous Grandmothers, Aaron Viles of The Gulf Restoration Network, Adele Douglass of Humane Farm Animal Care and many others.

Overmire's poetry has been widely published in the U.S. and abroad in hundreds of journals and anthologies. As an actor, he has performed on Broadway, film and television.

== Biography ==
=== Stage, TV and Film Career ===
Laurence Overmire began his professional acting career in 1981 at the Guthrie Theatre in Minneapolis appearing in Our Town directed by Alan Schneider, the American premier of Nelly Sachs' Eli: A Mystery Play of the Sufferings of Israel directed by Garland Wright, and Liviu Ciulei's productions of The Tempest, featuring Boyd Gaines and Frances Conroy, and As You Like It, starring Val Kilmer and Patti LuPone.

Thereafter, Overmire moved to New York City landing roles on and off Broadway including Amadeus directed by Sir Peter Hall and starring Frank Langella, Mark Hamill and Mary Elizabeth Mastrantonio, Joseph Papp's New York Shakespeare Festival production of Don Juan, directed by Richard Foreman and featuring future stars Kelly McGillis, Melissa Leo, and Jere Burns, Charles Busch's comedy hits Vampire Lesbians of Sodom and Psycho Beach Party, Robert David MacDonald's Summit Conference for New York Studio Theatre, and the Equity Library Theatre production of Lanford Wilson's Fifth of July.

Overmire also worked at many regional theatres across the country performing in Twelfth Night starring Ethan Phillips, Richard Ryder, Susan Diol and Christine Andreas at Alaska Repertory Theatre, Hay Fever with Mary-Louise Parker at Buffalo's Studio Arena Theater, The Tooth of Crime at Delaware Theatre Company, A Christmas Carol at Totem Pole Playhouse, Hamlet at Nashville Institute for the Arts directed by Eric Booth, Dracula and The Comedy of Errors directed by Charles Nolte at Michigan's Meadow Brook Theatre, and Henry IV part 1 at Yale Repertory Theatre directed by David Hammond and starring Paul Shenar, Patricia Clarkson, Dylan Baker, Adam LeFevre, Patrick Kerr and Courtney B. Vance.

On television, Overmire made numerous appearances on the network soaps All My Children, As the World Turns, Another World, One Life to Live and Loving working with such notable actors as Philip Bosco, Noelle Beck, Robert S. Woods, Cady McClain and Maurice Benard.

Later, Overmire moved to Hollywood where he starred in Roy Brocksmith's production of The One Less Traveled at the California Cottage Theatre, played a featured role in the independent feature film The Thing at Pete and Julie's directed by Jerry Rapp, and founded and served as Executive Producer of The Writer's Lab, a non-profit organization created to develop material for the entertainment industry. Many talented actors, writers and directors were involved with The Writer's Lab including Debra Jo Rupp, Jerry Lambert, Lucy Liu, Ted Lange, Kevin Meaney, Hill Harper, Richard Schiff, Robin Curtis, Michael Kostroff, Teresa Parente, Jeanne Glynn, Chris Mulkey, Anita Finlay, Forbes Riley, Time Winters, Mike Evans, and Yuri Rasovsky.

In 2007, Overmire directed his play A Scrooge Mart Christmas Carol for No Illusions Theatre in Portland, OR, raising over $3,000 for charity.

Throughout his career, he has been involved in education, developing and teaching arts programs for Lincoln Center Institute, Manhattan Theatre Club, Oregon Children's Theatre, and others.

=== Poetry ===
Laurence Overmire's poetry has been published in hundreds of magazines, journals and anthologies worldwide. Eclectic in form and style, his work can be provocative in its confrontation of social issues. He is the author of three books of poetry, Honor & Remembrance, Report From X-Star 10 and Gone Hollywood. He began writing poetry as a way to reflect upon his life experience, what became for him "a diary in art."

An advocate for peace, social justice, the environment, civil rights, human rights, and animal rights, Overmire was the Poet In Residence on The Jeff Farias Show in 2010, where during a weekly segment he would read poetry and discuss the political and social issues of the day. Central to his philosophy is the need for an open mind and an open heart. "I reserve the right to evolve. What I think and feel today is subject to revision tomorrow," he says.

In 2009, several of Overmire's peace poems including Middle Eastern Night and Day were translated into Arabic and published in the Lebanese newspaper An-Nahar. Recently, he has been publishing videopoems on YouTube (see videopoems below).

"Poetry is the art of using language to transcend language," Overmire says. "Much of my work comes out of two simple ideas. The first is The Golden Rule. Do unto others as you would have them do unto you. And the second is We are One. All of us are one family, interconnected and interdependent upon one another for our well-being. And central to both of these ideas are love and compassion. So a lot of what I write about are the things I see in the world that somehow violate these two ideas. As an artist, I believe it's very important to look at and confront the dark aspects of human nature. Those who refuse to look at or give expression to the dark side of life are in denial—fear preventing passage through the door of growth, truth and, ultimately, wisdom."

=== Genealogy ===
Laurence Overmire began researching his genealogy in the 1990s. He is a descendant of Gov. William Bradford, William Brewster and several other Mayflower passengers. He also has three Native American lines of ancestry. He created several databases on RootsWeb to help others trace their own family roots, including The Ancestry of Overmire, Tifft, Richardson, Bradford, Reed, which has generated more than 1.5 million hits. Note: Upon checking for the information on Rootsweb on Dec. 2, 2019, the full text of The Ancestry of Overmire, Tifft, Richardson, Bradford, Reed no longer seems to exist.

In 2009, Overmire completed One Immigrant's Legacy: The Overmyer Family in America 1751-2009, A Biographical Record of Revolutionary War Veteran Capt. John George Overmire and His Descendants. Recognized as the foremost authority on the Overmyer clan in the U.S., Laurence was the keynote speaker at the Overmyer Family National Reunion in Rochester, Fulton Co., IN, the first reunion of its kind in over 100 years.

In the afterword to One Immigrant's Legacy, Overmire writes, "Over the course of the millennia, all these multitudes of ancestors, generation upon generation, have come down to this moment in time - to give birth to you. There has never been, nor will ever be, another like you. You have been given a tremendous responsibility. You carry the hopes and dreams of all those who have gone before. Hopes and dreams for a better world. What will you do with your time on this Earth? How will you contribute to the ongoing story of humankind?"

=== Education ===
Overmire graduated summa cum laude as valedictorian from Muskingum University, Ohio, in 1979, with a Bachelor of Arts in Theatre and a Bachelor of Science in Psychology. He was awarded a Bush Fellowship to attend graduate school at the University of Minnesota, Minneapolis, where he received his Master of Fine Arts

=== Honors and awards ===
- Selected as Judge for the Oregon state finals of the NEA's National Poetry Out Loud Recitation contest, 2011, and for the regionals, 2012
- Received Enchanting Verses International Poetry Journal's "Enchanting Poet Award", 2008
- First Place and Honorable Mention prizes for the Barnes & Noble Everybody Reads Contest, Fahrenheit 451, 2004
- Poetry Award for The Poet’s Porch and named to the Poet's Hall of Fame, 2001
- Honorable Mention in The Jeremiah Reeves Poetry Prize For Justice, Uprising, Issue #5, Apr 1999

== Books ==
- Honor & Remembrance: A Poetic Journey through American History (Indelible Mark Publishing, 2007)
- Report From X-Star 10: Sci-Fi Poetry (Indelible Mark Publishing, 2009)
- One Immigrant's Legacy: The Overmyer Family in America, 1751-2009, A Biographical Record of Revolutionary War Veteran Capt. John George Overmire and His Descendants (Indelible Mark Publishing, 2009)
- Gone Hollywood (Indelible Mark Publishing, 2011)
- The One Idea That Saves The World: A Call to Conscience and A Call to Action (Indelible Mark Publishing, 2012)

== Plays ==
- Slingshot (2005)
- A Woman In Washington's Army (2007)
- A Scrooge Mart Christmas Carol (2007)

== Videopoems ==
- Ode To An Endangered Species on YouTube, 2010
- Viewpoint on YouTube, 2010
- Beach Walk At Sunset on YouTube, 2010
- Maybe the Trees on YouTube, 2011

== Selected Poems ==
- A Little Poetry, Voracious Verses, 2007 Overmire poems: Unable to Label, Gyroscope, Burning Wood
- Jack Magazine, Vol. 1 No. 1, 2000 Overmire poems: Less Than Infinity, Kerouac, The Right Reverend, Dastardly Dick
- Boloji Media Inc., India Overmire poems: Don't Interfere, Mentor, Nuclear Fission, Sunblock, The Burning of Alexandria
- Thanal Online, Vol 1, Issue 2, 2006 Overmire poems: Only the Poets, Sins of the Fathers, Sitting Bull's Dream, The Road to Baghdad, Refracting LIght
- Poets Against War, ed. Sam Hamill, Overmire poems: The Warning of Tombstones, There's, Bodies
- Kimera: A Journal of Fine Writing, Winter 1998 Volume 3, Number 2, Overmire poems: The Amish Girl, Reunion, Mid-Life
- Swans, Boonville, CA, Dec. 2000 Overmire poem: Refugee
- Badosa Literary Project, 2002 Overmire poems: Expectant, Forgiveness, How Old?, Good and Bad, Last Card
- The Courtship of Winds, Issue 1, Jan 2000 Overmire poems: The Convention, Killer Groceries, Snowbound
- Gangway, Issue 30/31, Mar 2004, Germany Overmire poems: Sand in the Mouth, Schlock, Die Andere, Pig Heart, Jobber Wocky
- Scottish Radiance, Scotland, Nov 2000 Overmire poem: Culloden Moor
- ken*again, the literary magazine, Vol. 2, No.2, May 2001 Overmire poem: Dance of the Wounded Heart
- The Pittsburgh Quarterly Online, Jan 2000 Overmire poem: The Wake of a Dream
- Rustlings of the Wind: Whereness Issue, 2000 Overmire poem: In-Betweens
- Tryst, Issue V, June 1, 2003 Overmire poem: The Fallow Time
- The Centrifugal Eye, Aug. 2008 Overmire poems: Saturday Night, Brooklyn Nights
- CommonSense2, Aug. 2008 Overmire poem: Good Guys and Bad Guys

== Audio/Video ==
- Writers Read, Stage and Studio with Dmae Roberts, KBOO 90.7FM, March, 2011
- Laurence Overmire, Poet-in-Residence, The Jeff Farias Show, Video Recordings, 2010

== Anthologies ==
- World's Strand, An International Anthology of Poetry (Mandelbachtal-Cambridge 2006)
- The Taj Mahal Review (Cyberwit, India, vol. 5, no. 2, 2006)
- Poets Against War (ed. Sam Hamill, Port Townsend, WA, 2003)
- Poetry The Write Way: Webstatic – First Journey (Iuniverse Inc., June 2000)
- Rinse and Repeat (Scars Publications, Chicago, IL, 1999)
- The Other Voices International Project (Vol. 20, 2006)

== See also ==
- List of peace activists
