= Taft High School (Lincoln City, Oregon) =

Location
- 3780 Spyglass Ridge SE; Lincoln City, (Lincoln County), Oregon 97367; United States; 44.937596°N 124.015464°W

Information
- Type: Public
- Established: 1998 (current building)
- School district: Lincoln County School District
- Principal: Nick Lupo
- Grades: 7–12
- Enrollment: 311 (2025-26)
- Colors: Orange and Black
- Athletics conference: OSAA PacWest Conference 3A-3
- Mascot: Tiger
- Newspaper: The 45th Parallel
- Website: Taft High School

Taft High School, also known as Taft High 7–12, is a public high school and middle school located in Lincoln City, Oregon, United States. It is one of five high schools in the Lincoln County School District. It serves students from seventh through twelfth grade. It is named for Taft, one of the communities that combined to form Lincoln City in 1965.

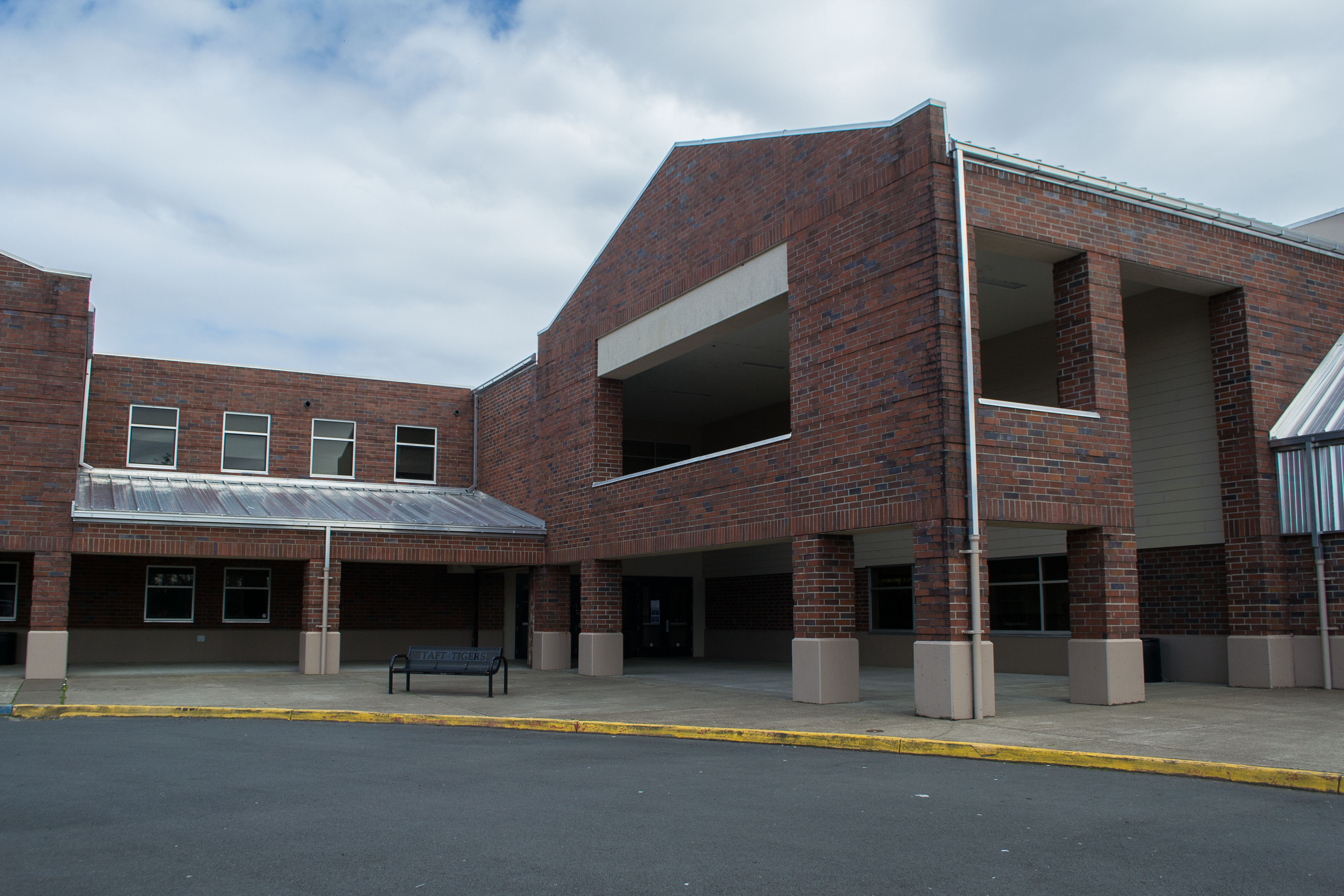
The front entrance of Taft High School as it appeared in March 2013

== Notable alumni/staff ==
- Agnes Baker Pilgrim (1942), spiritual elder of the Takelma Tribe and chairperson of the International Council of 13 Indigenous Grandmothers.
- Gary Stevens (1959), current president of the Alaska Senate.
- Health advocate teacher Angela Schafer was convicted in June 2025 for raping a student under the age of 16 from the school.
