= Bernadette Rebienot =

Traditional healer from Gabon

Rose Bernadette Rebienot Owansango
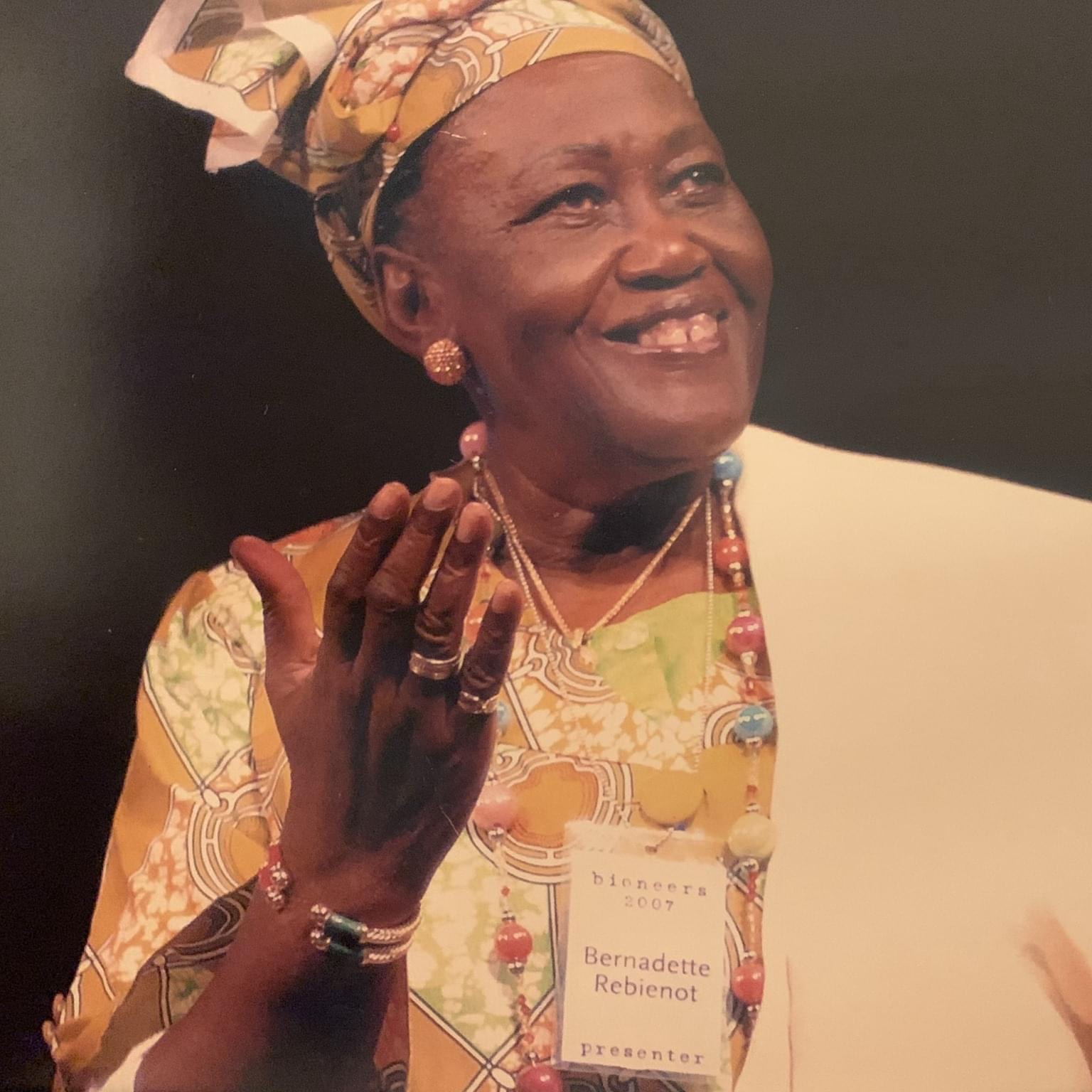
- Born: 1 January 1934; Libreville
- Died: 21 January 2021 (aged 87); Libreville
- Occupation: Traditional medicine practitioner
- Organization: Village Oyenano
- Known for: Member of the International Council of 13 Indigenous Grandmothers
- Title: President of the Union of Traditional Medicine Practitioners from Gabon

Rose Bernadette Rebienot Owansango (1 January 1934 – 21 January 2021) was a traditional medicine practitioner from Gabon known for her membership in the International Council of 13 Indigenous Grandmothers.

== Early life ==
Rebienot was born in Libreville on 1 January 1934.

Although having received a Catholic education, Rebienot was confronted with traditional African medicine at a very young age. As a teenager, she suffered from incurable pain in her feet. She found no effective solution to help her ailments, and turned to traditional medicine through which she received relief. She was initiated into the traditional Ndjembè rite in July 1948 at the age of 14. In July 1958, she ascended to the supreme grade of Ngwèvilo (priestess).

She was later introduced to the Bwiti Dissumba rite with iboga and then to Abanji, which opened the doors to her career as a traditional healer on a national and international scale. She worked for a better knowledge of the use of iboga and for an enhancement of the place of women in society.

== Career ==
She was the president and founder of the association Village Oyenano, located in Libreville and which works for the development of traditional medicine and the preservation of cultural heritage.

She started as president of the Union of Traditional Medicine Practitioners from Gabon in 1994.

Rebienot and Maria Alice Campos Freire met Jyoti, a descendent of the Cherokee Nation, and encouraged Jyoti to gather indigenous grandmothers, which she did starting with their first meeting in 2004 at the Dhalai Lama's retreat. This gathering became known as the International Council of 13 Indigenous Grandmothers established in 2004. The last meeting was held at Village Oyenano, and resulted in the production of a film entitled Le Dernier Conseil by Jean-Claude Cheyssial.

Rebienot died on January 21, 2021. She was the mother of 10 biological children.

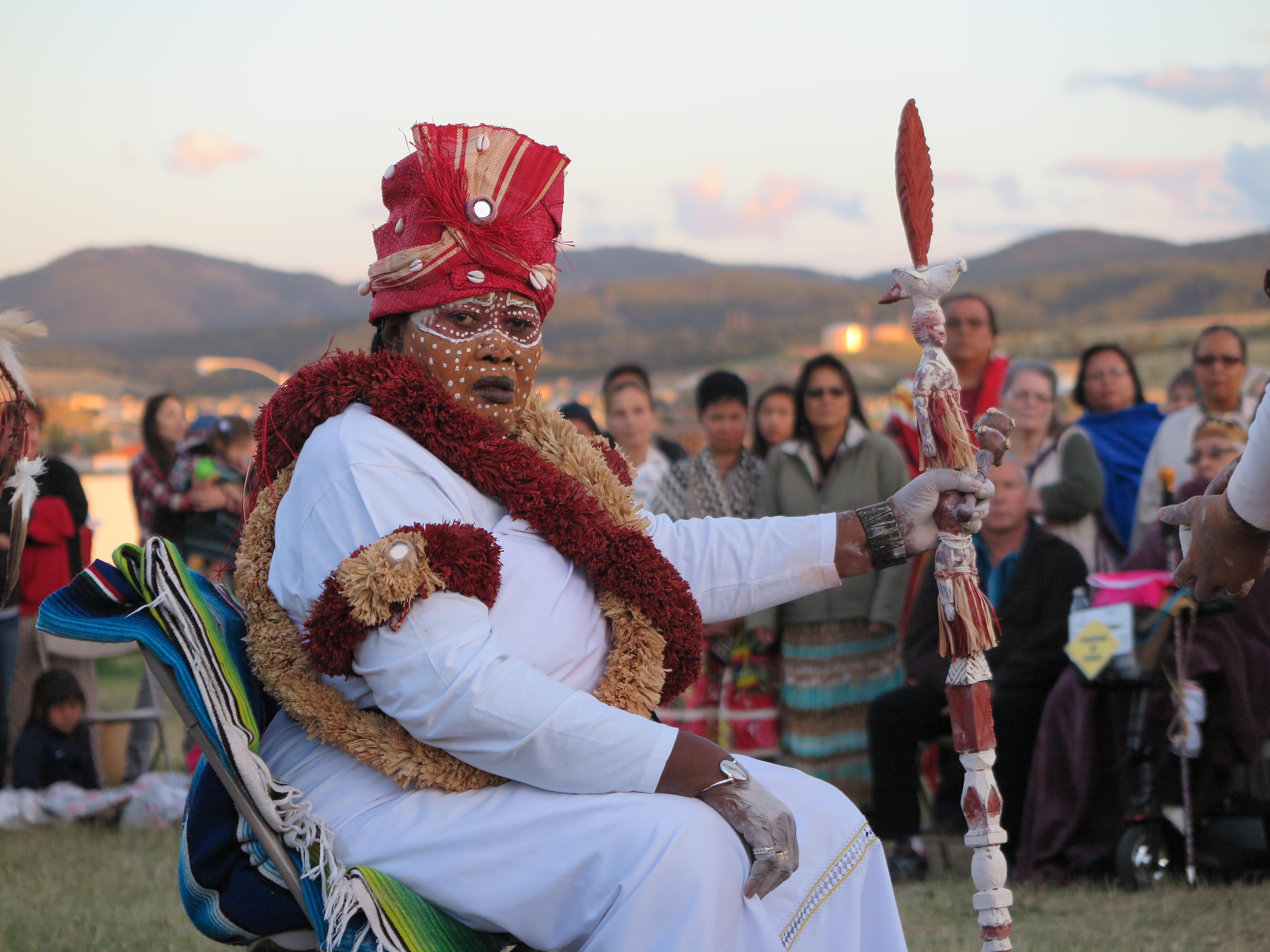
Grandmother Bernadette at the Council of 13 Indigenous Grandmothers held in Spear Fish, South Dakota, USA in 2014.

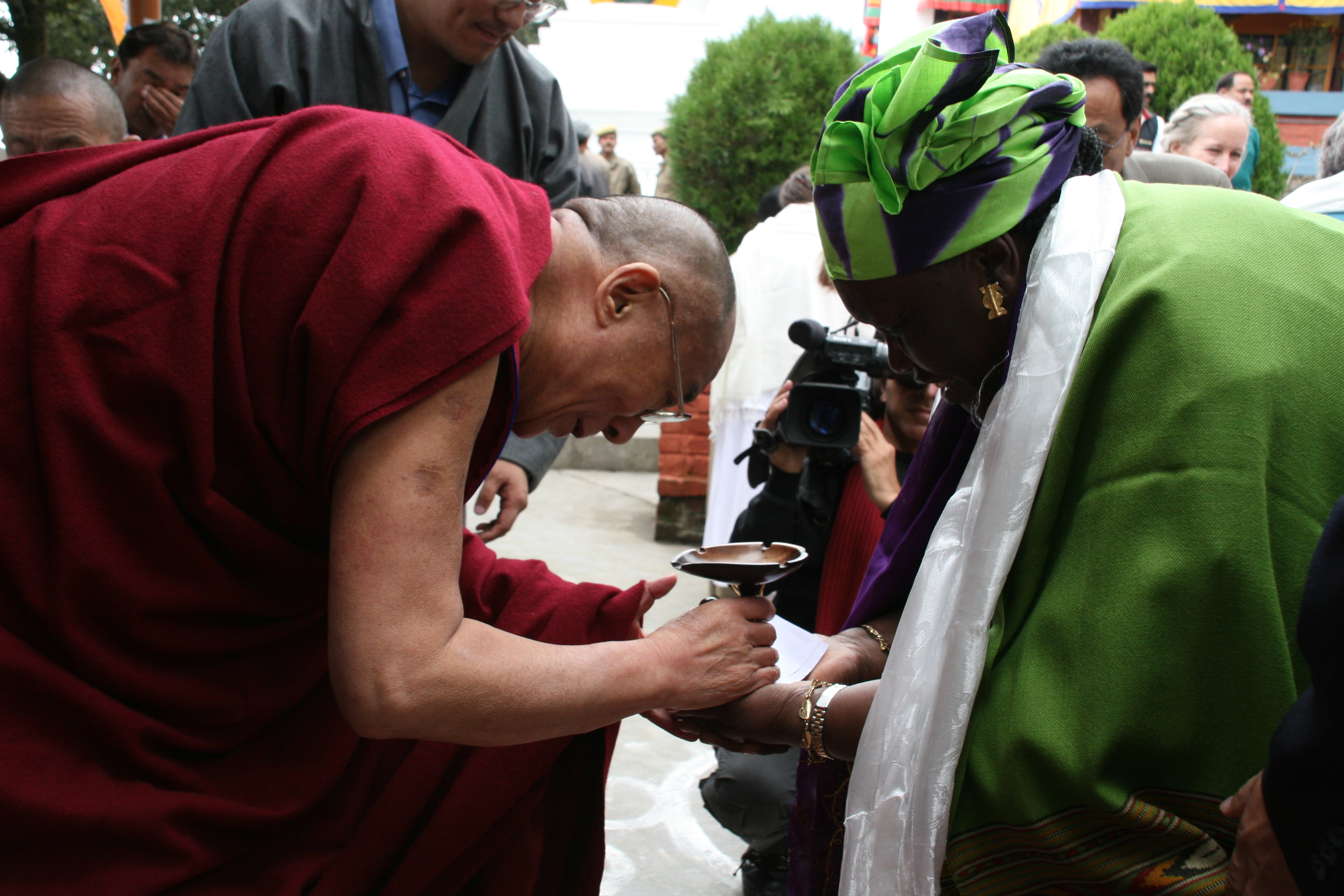
Grandmother Bernadette with the Dalai Lama during the Council of 13 Indigenous Grandmothers held in India in Dharamsala in October 2006.

== Filmography ==
- Secrets de femmes de Jean-Claude Cheyssial (1999)
- L'esprit de l'Ayahuasca de Jean-Claude Cheyssial (2002)
- La Guérisseuse de la forêt de Jean-Claude Cheyssial (2005)
- For the next 7th Generations de Bruce Hart et Carol Hart (2009)
- Le Dernier Conseil de Jean-Claude Cheyssial (2016)
