= Temperance Row Historic District =

Historic district in Ohio, United States

- U.S. National Register of Historic Places
- U.S. Historic district
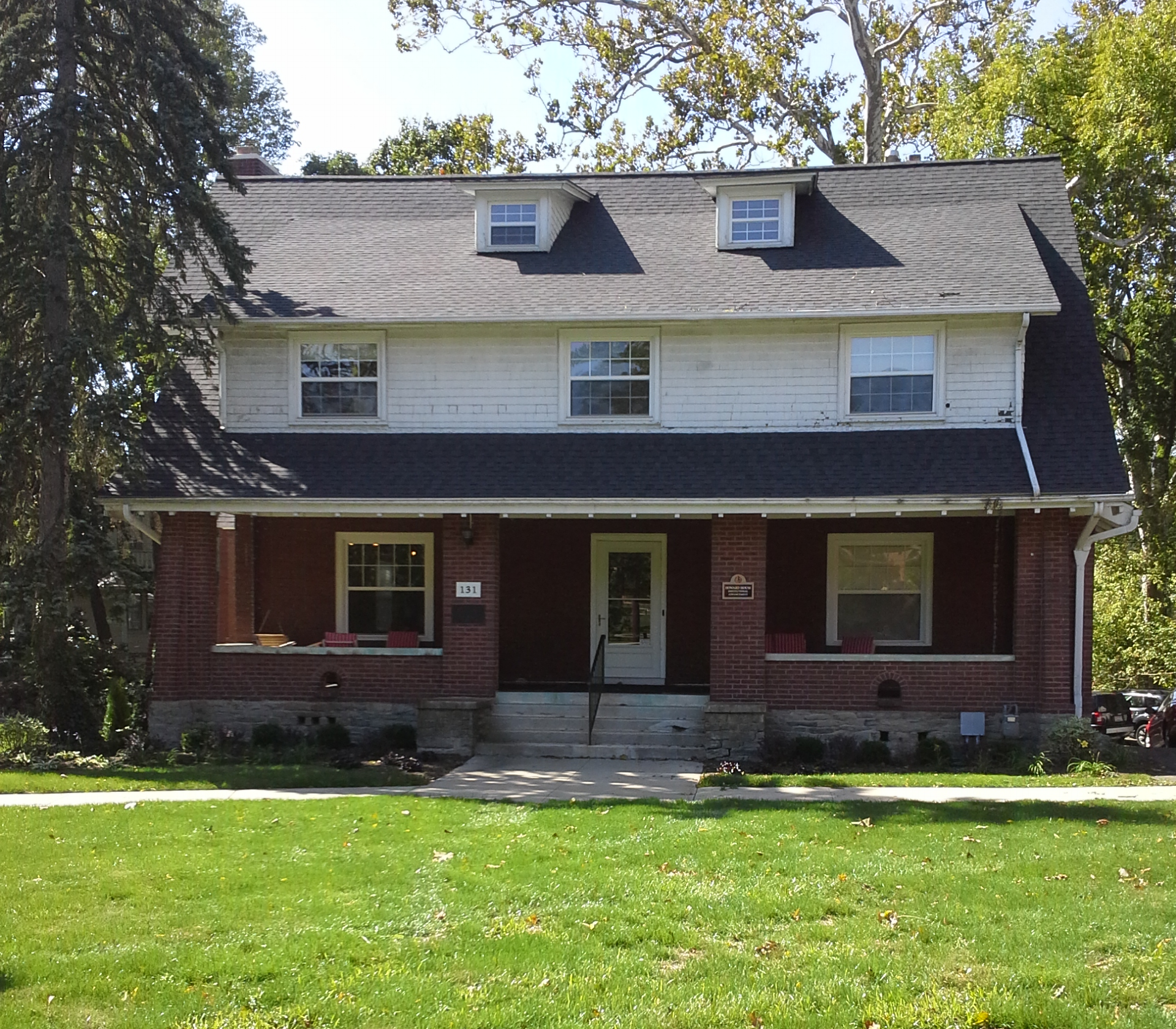

- Location within Ohio Location within the United States
- Location: Park, Grove, Walnut, and University Sts., Westerville, Ohio
- Coordinates: 40°7′24″N 82°56′11″W
- Area: 11 acres (4.5 ha)
- Built: 1900-1949
- NRHP reference No.: 08000995
- Added to NRHP: October 16, 2008

The Temperance Row Historic District is a historic district in Westerville, Ohio. Westerville became the headquarters of the Anti-Saloon League of America (ASLA) in 1909. In the same year, the 11-acre (45,000 m^{2}) tract of land that would become Temperance Row was purchased by Purley Baker, general superintendent of the ASLA. Over the next fifteen years, new homes in the district were built for and occupied by the founders and leaders of the ASLA. The architecture in the district is predominantly Craftsman in style. The district was listed on the National Register of Historic Places on October 16, 2008.

It is the 17th property listed as a featured property of the week in a program of the National Park Service that began in July, 2008.
