= Agnes Baker Pilgrim =

American activist

- Taowhywee (or Morningstar)
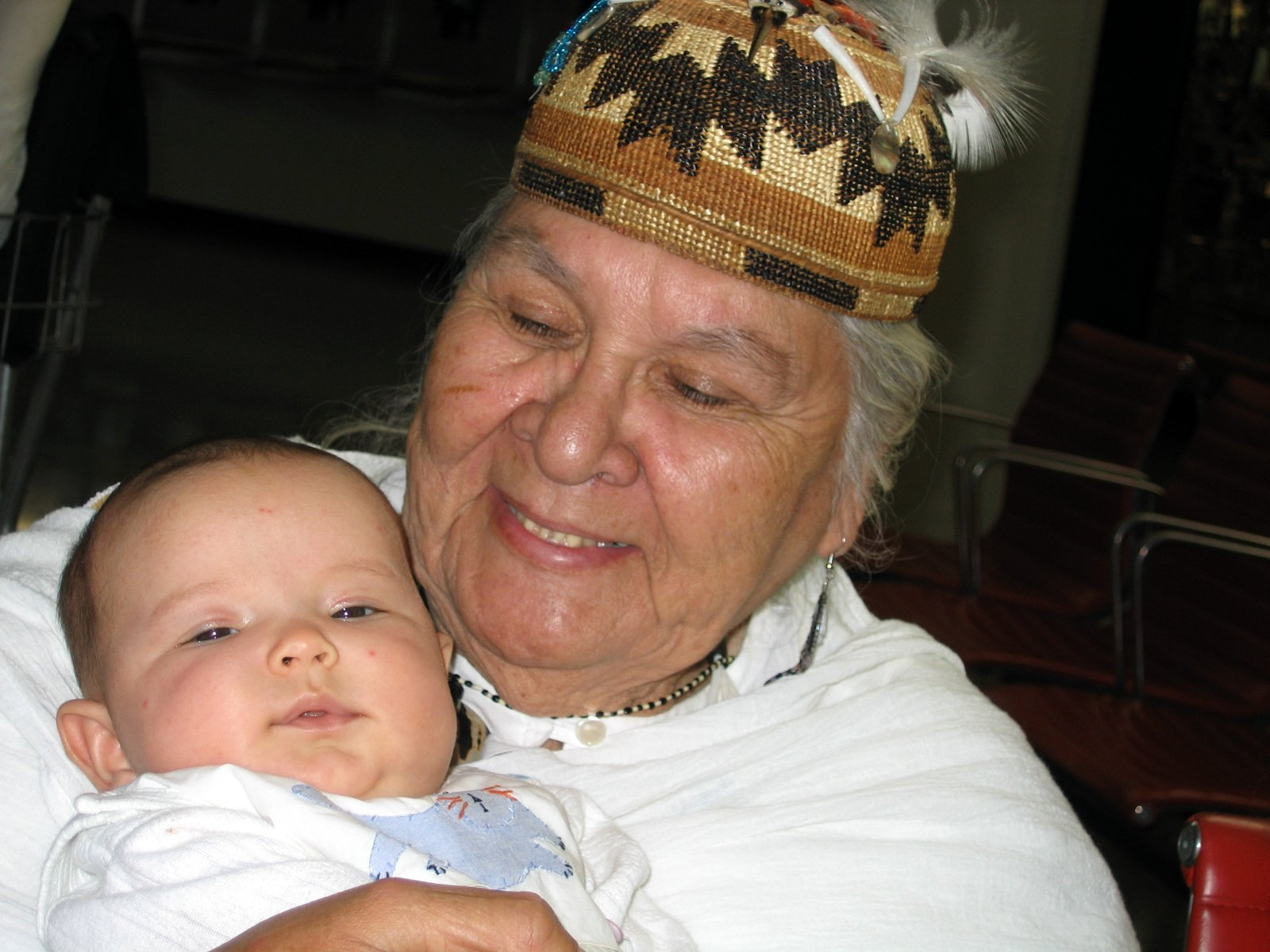
- Pilgrim (with friend)

Takelma, Confederated Tribes of Siletz leader

Personal details
- Born: September 11, 1924 Logsden, Oregon
- Died: November 27, 2019 (aged 95) Grants Pass, Oregon
- Education: Taft High School; Southern Oregon State College
- Known for: Chairperson of International Council of 13 Indigenous Grandmothers; brought back the 'Salmon Ceremony' to Southern Oregon after 150 years.
- Nickname: Grandma Aggie

Agnes Emma Baker Pilgrim (September 11, 1924 – November 27, 2019) was a Native American spiritual elder from Grants Pass, Oregon. She was the oldest member of her tribe, the Takelma. She was also the granddaughter of Jack Harney, the first elected Chief of the Confederated Tribes of Siletz. Pilgrim was Elected Chairperson of the International Council of 13 Indigenous Grandmothers at its founding in 2004. "She was honored as a "Living Treasure" by the Confederated Tribes of Siletz, and as a "Living Cultural Legend" by the Oregon Council of the Arts."

== Personal life ==
Pilgrim was born on September 11, 1924 having been delivered by Elizabeth Juliana Tole Harney, Pilgrim's grandmother who was a midwife. Her family was poor during the Depression and survived with no electricity.

Grandma Aggie, as she was affectionately known, had a rich and varied working life ranging from working for the Indian Health Service as a physician's assistant, an alcohol and drug counselor, a scrub nurse, a logger, a singer, a bouncer, a barber in a jail and a stock car racing driver.

Married three times, Pilgrim had three daughters and three sons. Pilgrim also had twenty grandchildren, thirty-one great-grandchildren and a great-great-grandchild.

In 1982 Pilgrim was seriously ill with cancer. Pilgrim claimed that she asked the Creator to let her live as she had many friends and family who relied on her, and that, she had a lot left to do in the world. Ever since that time she had a transformation and gravitated to a very spiritual type of life – even though Pilgrim admitted to have initially being reluctant to travel her spiritual path as she doubted her worthiness for this task.

Agnes Baker Pilgrim spoke of her life, her calling and her philosophy in an oral history collected on January 23, 2018, on the banks of the Rogue River in Grants Pass, Oregon as part of the Stories of Southern Oregon project at Southern Oregon University.

== Sacred Salmon Ceremony ==
A ceremony to welcome, bless, and thank the returning salmon each year was held by the Takelma tribe, as well as many other Indian tribes in the northwest United States and Canada, . However, for 140 years, due to the loss of traditional ways, the ceremony was not performed publicly by the Takelma tribe. To revive the ceremony, Pilgrim and her late husband Grant Pilgrim (Yurok tribe), visited with area tribes that continued to perform this ceremony. Following numerous visits to ceremonial and spiritual gatherings of northwest tribes, the Pilgrims brought back their version of the ceremony to Southern Oregon. Due to Pilgrim's contribution in returning the Salmon Ceremony to Jackson County, she is known to some locals as the 'Keeper of the Sacred Salmon Ceremony'.

A great deal of interest has since been shown by the National Geographic magazine and the World Wildlife Fund and Martha Stewart due to the unprecedented increase in salmon seen in the river since the ceremony has been performed.

The ceremony is annually held on the bank of the Applegate River in Southwest Oregon

== Konanway Nika Tillicum (All My Relations) Youth Academy ==
While studying psychology and Native American studies at Southern Oregon University at the age of 50, Pilgrim co-founded the Konanway Nika Tillicum (All My Relations) Native American Summer Youth Academy. She was the Elder-Woman-in-Residence for the academy.

== The International Council of 13 Grandmothers ==
In 2004, Pilgrim was approached by The Center for Sacred Studies to serve on the International Council of 13 Indigenous Grandmothers. Pilgrim was the oldest of the Grandmothers and was elected as the council's Chairpersonchairman.

The council has been active in protecting indigenous rights and medicines, promoting ancient wisdom.

Pilgrim considered the International Council of 13 Grandmothers not to have come together by accident, coming at the eleventh hour to be "a voice for the voiceless."

In 2008, she traveled with the group on "a trip to Rome to try to get Pope Benedict XVI to rescind historical papal bulls, which played a role in the genocidal onslaught of indigenous people worldwide," according to Indian Country Today Media Network.

== Legacy ==
Pilgrim's likeness is featured in the bronze statue, We Are Here, in downtown Ashland, Oregon. Pilgrim attended the dedication ceremony on May 24, 2013.
