= Margaret Behan =

American activist

- Red Spider Woman
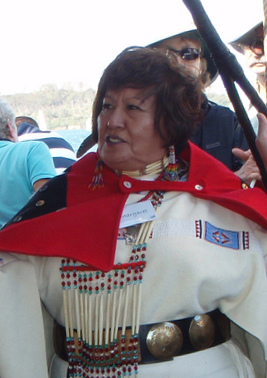
- Margaret Behan blessing a 350.org event in 2009

Arapaho/Cheyenne leader

Personal details
- Born: July 4, 1948 (age 77) Clinton Indian Health Center
- Children: 3
- Parent(s): Harry Behan and Daisy Behan (nee Fletcher)
- Education: St. Patrick's Mission School, to age 10. Concho Government Boarding School to age 13. Chilacco Government Boarding School, Jr. College in Weatherford, Oklahoma and Brigham Young University
- Known for: The Founder and CEO of the privately incorporated organization "Cheyenne Elders Council".
- Nickname: Maggie
- mentioned in Father Powell's "Sweet Medicine"

Margaret Behan (born July 4, 1948), is a Native American artist and a former member of the International Council of 13 Grandmothers.

== Early years ==
Behan is "of the Kit Fox Clan of the Cheyenne Nation of Oklahoma on her mother’s side, and on her father’s side she is half Northern Cheyenne and half Arapahoe of the Rabbit Lodge." She was one of eight children. Her parents were migrant farmworkers. Behan claims that she was prayed for and a Peyote ceremony was arranged before her conception.

She is a fourth generation descendant of a survivor of the Sand Creek Massacre.

== Personal life ==
Behan has 3 children, 11 grandchildren, and one great grandchild.

== Work as an artist ==
Began's mother-in-law suggested that she might want to work in clay after noticing Behan's work on a pair of beaded moccasins. Behan felt so confident in her new career as an artist that she resigned from her job in 1982 and took up her new artistic career full-time. Her work is mentioned in four Folk Art books. She later moved to Taos, New Mexico due to the properties of the clay there.

== Addiction work ==
Behan suffered from alcohol addiction as a young woman. She feels that she drank in order to 'fit in' with her friends. With the aid of addiction clinics, and more of her grandparents' ceremonies, she was able to become free of her addiction.

As a result of this experience, Behan trained to be a Licensed Substance abuse Counselor and with her traditional teachings, has led retreats for children and co-dependants of alcoholics to help other First Nation people that had found themselves in a similar position. Historical trauma commonly leads to alcohol, drug, and behaviour issues.

== The Cheyenne Elders Council ==
Behan is the founder of "The Cheyenne Elders Council", formed in 2007–2008, with Behan as the sole member, and has the mission to, "Heal Our Own Oppression." She had recently bought land next to the Northern Cheyenne Reservation, and said she "was troubled when she heard one of her people say that Cheyenne youth would have to save themselves," saying "They were not getting any kind of influence or teaching from the elders." Behan reported that she had created "the T’sistsistas’s Sacred School" in her home. Behan says, "We need to bring our Cheyenne identity and pride back to the young people, teach them the traditional ceremonies and language."

She was interviewed by AARP International Magazine in October, 2011.

In July 2012, Behan hosted the "11th Gathering of the International Council of 13 Indigenous Grandmothers" at which the riders commemorating the Northern Cheyenne Exodus of 1878 shared stories of their journey. Initially planned to be held on her private property, wildfires led to the event being held at the pow wow grounds leased from the Northern Cheyenne Reservation. "The gathering ... [was] set up as a traditional Cheyenne encampment", with "thirteen teepees, one for each grandmother." In attendance was a great-great-great grandniece of General Custer, who made a "formal apology to the Northern Cheyenne," and a great-great-granddaughter of Brig. Gen. Anson Mills, who also offered an apology.

A two-part video of attendees from Vashon Intuitive Arts describing the event is available on the Internet Archive.
