= Aama Bombo =

Nepali shaman

Aama Bombo or Buddhi Maya Lama is a shaman in the Nepali Tamang tradition. Aama Bombo means "Mother Shaman." She is also a member of the International Council of 13 Indigenous Grandmothers (IC13G).

== Biography ==
Bombo was born in Melong and later moved to Kathmandu after she was married at age sixteen. Following convulsions at age 25, she believed that her dead father, who had taught her shamanism as a child, was trying to leave her body. She began to practice as a faith healer afterwards. She is one of the first female shamans among the Tamang people.

She sees around 60 people a day at the Boudhanath Temple. Her work involves removing "bad spirits" from people, and she does not claim to cure cancer. She also teaches students about spirituality and faith healing.
