= Tsering Dolma Gyaltong =

Tibetan spiritual leader (1930–2018)

- Born: August 27, 1930; Lhasa, Tibet
- Died: March 5, 2018
- Known for: Member of International Council of 13 Indigenous Grandmothers, revived the Tibetan Women's Association

Tsering Dolma Gyaltong was a Tibetan spiritual leader living in exile in Toronto, Ontario, Canada. Tsering was a Founding Member of the Tibetan Women's Association and participated in its re-establishment in 1984.

She openly criticized China's treatment of Tibetans.

Tsering was a member of the International Council of 13 Indigenous Grandmothers–a group of spiritual elders, medicine women and wisdom keepers–until her death in 2018.

== Life ==
On March 17, 1959, the day that the Dalai Lama began his escape from the Norbulingka Palace, the Tibetan Women's Association, of which Tsering was a founding member, carried out a street demonstration with 500 of its members in protest of China's Invasion of Tibet and the Chinese government's treatment of Tibetans. Due to her role in the demonstration, Tsering is said to have been 'instrumental' in creating the diversion to get the Dalai Lama out of Tibet in 1959. Tsering's husband, Tsering Gyaltong, had a role in lobbying for support for Tibet from other governments. Because of his political action, Tsering and her family had to leave Chinese-occupied Tibet. Tsering followed the Dalai Lama into exile in India.

Tsering and her family moved to Toronto, Canada in 1972.

In 1984, Tsering returned to India to reinstate the central Tibetan Women's Association. She took on many roles on the Executive Committee over the span of 10 years: Vice President from 1985–1988, Special Assistant from 1988–1991, Vice President from June–October in 1992, and President from 1993–1994.

== Fourth World Women’s Conference ==
Tsering and two other Canadian Tibetan Refugees were joined by Tibetan delegates from Australia, Norway, Sweden, the United Kingdom, and the United States at the Fourth World Conference on Women, which was held in Beijing, China in 1995. Here, Tsering and her fellow delegates criticized China's treatment of Tibetans, especially women.

Due to the heavy-handedness of Chinese security, Tsering's outspokenness, and the actions of other members of the Tibetan Women's Delegation, the event was seen as a public relations disaster for China.

Another success was that they were able to meet with hundreds of other international female delegates. They were able to network and get their message heard internationally.

== The International Council of 13 Grandmothers ==
In 2004, Tsering was approached by The Center for Sacred Studies to serve on the International Council of 13 Indigenous Grandmothers.

The council has been active in protecting indigenous rights and medicines, and promoting indigenous wisdom traditions. In 2006, Tsering Dolma Gyaltong hosted a visit by the Grandmothers to Dharamshala, where they presented a sacred condor feather to the Dalai Lama, held prayers for world peace, and "emphasised on protection of the diverse cultural heritage in the form of different languages, medicine and ceremonies."
