= Izzy Einstein and Moe Smith =

American Prohibition enforcement officer duo, celebrity cops

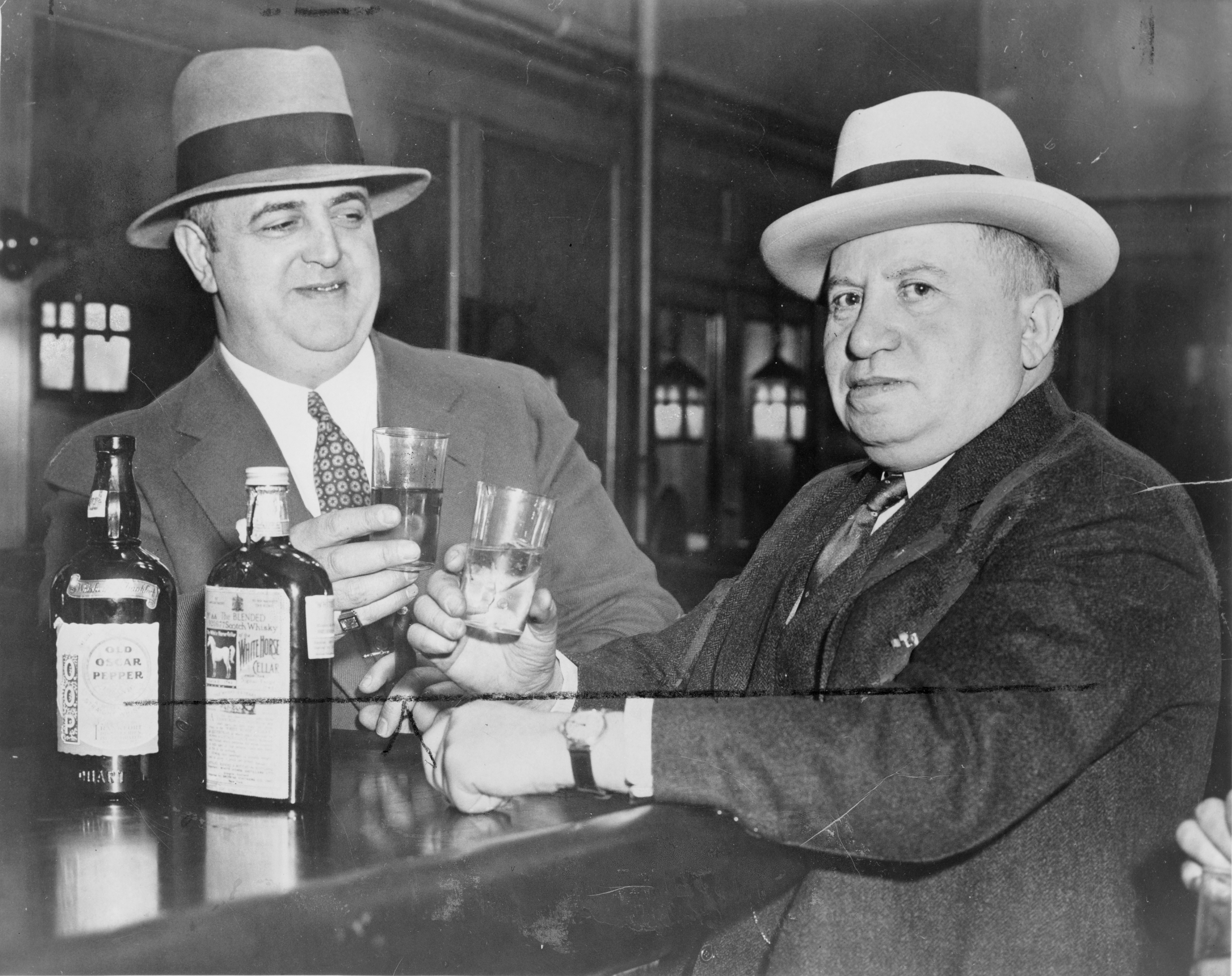
Izzy (right) and Moe at a New York City bar, 1935

Isidor "Izzy" Einstein (1880–1938) and Moe W. Smith (1887–1960) were United States federal police officers, agents of the U.S. Prohibition Unit, who achieved the most arrests and convictions during the first years of the alcohol prohibition era (1920–1925). They were known nationally for successfully shutting down illegal speakeasies and for using disguises in their work.

They made 4,933 arrests. In late 1925, Izzy and Moe were laid off in a reorganization of the bureau of enforcement. A report in Time magazine suggested they had attracted more publicity than wanted by the new political appointee heading the bureau, although the press and public loved the team. By 1930 both men were working as insurance salesmen.

== Early lives and educations ==
Isidor Einstein (sometimes spelled Isadore) was born in 1880 into a Jewish family in the Austro-Hungarian Empire. He grew up speaking Yiddish and likely was educated in a yeshiva; he also learned Hungarian, Polish and German, together with a smattering of other European languages. Einstein emigrated as a young man to the United States around 1901.

Moe W. Smith was born about 1887 in New York City. As a young man, Moe was a boxer for awhile before opening his own cigar shop. He was then invited by his good friend Izzy to become his partner in prohibition. Moe married a Jewish native from Bohemia named Sadie Strauch, they had one daughter named Estelle in 1925..

== Marriages and families ==
Around 1906, Einstein married Esther (born c. 1888, Austria/Galicia; immigrated c. 1891), an immigrant from Galicia. They had at least seven children together, but two died young before 1910. Surviving children were Joseph (c. 1910), Charles (c. 1912), Edward (c. 1914), Albert (c. 1916), and Milton (c. 1927).

Before 1920 Smith married Sadie Strauch, a Jewish native of Bohemia in the Austro-Hungarian Empire, who had immigrated to New York and was a native Yiddish speaker. In the 1920 census, Moe and Sadie Smith (born c. 1891, imm./nat. 1898 or 1900) were recorded as living with her brother, Benjamin Strauch in Brooklyn. Their daughter Estelle was born c. 1925.

== Careers ==
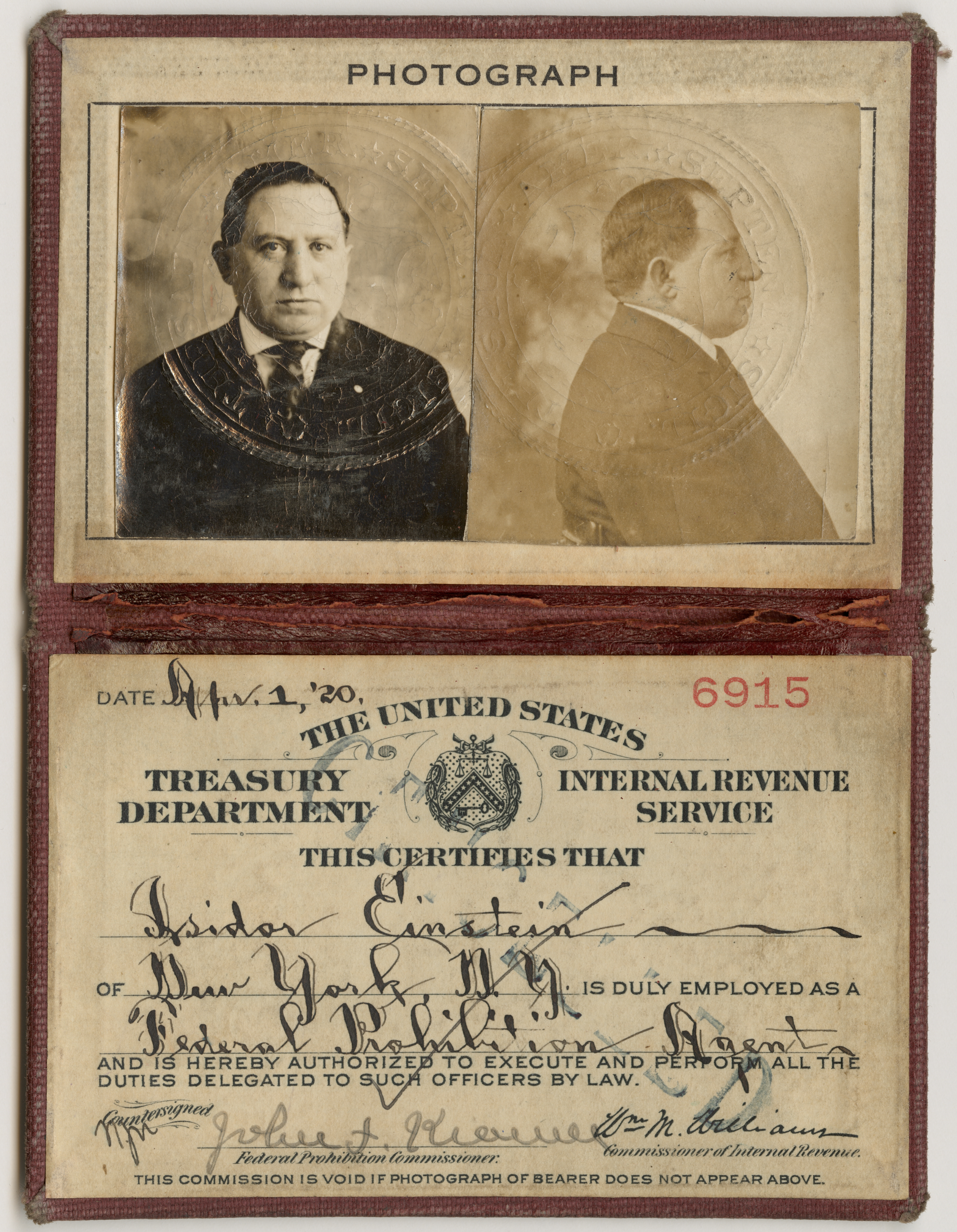
Izzy Einstein's badge.

Einstein had started work as a salesman and later served as a postal clerk. He struggled to support his family, including his father, on that salary. Smith first worked as a cigar salesman, and then managed a small fight club. He also owned a cigar store.

The ratification in 1919 of the amendment to establish Prohibition in the United States required federal and local police forces to recruit new members rapidly in order to enforce the law. With no background in law enforcement, but speaking several languages (Yiddish, Hungarian, German, Polish, with a little Russian, French, Spanish and Italian) in addition to English, Einstein signed up as Prohibition Agent No. 1. In a short time, he invited his friend Moe Smith to join him as a partner. (They were both Masons, and may have met in the fraternal group. Though both were personally indifferent to temperance, they felt the law must be upheld, no matter how hard it was to enforce.)

Einstein and Smith were both rather rotund and apparently disarmed many of their quarry by their unthreatening appearances. They claimed to have used more than 100 disguises and were never detected. Einstein developed what he called the "Einstein Theory of Rum Snooping". They usually did not carry weapons and made arrests while unarmed. Their disguises included appearing as "streetcar conductor, gravedigger, fisherman, iceman, opera singer" and as the state of Kentucky delegates to the Democratic National Convention of 1924 held in New York, where they found only soda being served. Several times Einstein went to a bar and identified himself as a Prohibition agent. The bouncer, thinking he was joking, laughed and let him in. One time he took bets in the joint that he was the agent whose picture was up on the wall. When the customers paid up, he arrested them.

As Prohibition Bureau agents, they were the most famous and successful, known nationally for making thousands of arrests and gaining a high rate of convictions. They made 4,932 arrests, and achieved a 95% conviction rate. They confiscated 5 million US gal (19 million L) of liquor, worth an estimated $15 million. As a result of their work, thousands of bartenders, bootleggers and speakeasy owners were sentenced to jail.

Einstein and Smith used the press to build support:

They frequently scheduled their raids to suit the convenience of the reporters and the newspaper photographers, and soon learned that there was more room in the papers on Monday mornings than on any other day of the week. One Sunday, accompanied by a swarm of eager reporters, they established a record by making seventy-one raids in a little more than twelve hours.

In November 1925, the partners were among 38 men laid off from the New York office after a reorganization plan announced by General Lincoln C. Andrews of the national bureau. He and other officials in Washington, D.C. appeared to resent the favorable coverage that Einstein and Smith received, who gained far more attention than higher officials. Andrews was reported as disapproving of Prohibition agents who gained publicity, and Einstein and Smith's exploits had been well covered by the press, both tabloids and major papers such as The New York Times; their successes were sensational. As Time magazine wrote at the time,

The public which looked upon them with as much delight as ever it looked on Robin Hood was denied their adventures — adventures as thrilling as those of Sir Launcelot, as those of Richard Cœur de Lion, as those of Don Quixote de la Mancha.

== Later lives ==
Both men went into the insurance business and did well, despite the Great Depression. Einstein worked for the New York Life Insurance Company. He died at age 57, February 17, 1938, several days after having a leg amputated. He was buried at Mount Zion Cemetery, Queens County, New York.

Smith lived until 1960, when he died from a stroke in Yonkers, New York.

== Legacy and honors ==
- Einstein wrote an autobiography telling of their exploits, called Prohibition Agent No 1. It was published in 1932. It had almost a million readers.
- At their deaths, each man was featured in an obituary in the national magazine Time, which noted their joint achievements during Prohibition as the "funniest and most effective team" of federal agents, who made more than 4,900 arrests and confiscated an estimated 5 million bottles of illegal liquor.

== In popular culture ==
- Einstein and Smith's achievements inspired the television film, Izzy and Moe (1985), directed by Jackie Cooper. Jackie Gleason starred as Izzy, and Art Carney as Moe. Einstein's great-grandson appears in the film.
- The musical Nowhere to Go But Up, which recalls the exploits of Einstein and Smith, had a brief run on Broadway in 1962, playing 3 previews and 9 performances at the Winter Garden Theatre. Appearing as Einstein and Smith were Tom Bosley and Martin Balsam respectively. The show had music by Sol Berkowitz, book and lyrics by James Lipton, and was directed by Sidney Lumet.
