= Roy Asa Haynes =

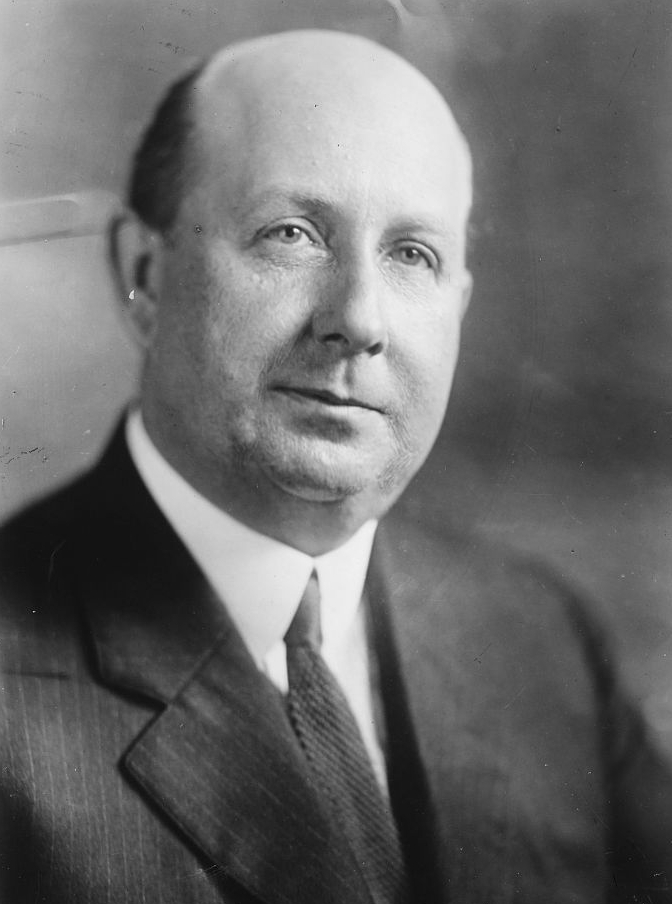

Assistant Secretary of the Treasury in charge of Prohibition enforcement
- In office 16 March 1921 – 31 March 1925
- Preceded by: office established
- Succeeded by: Lincoln Clark Andrews

Personal details
- Born: 1881
- Died: 1941 (aged 59–60)

Roy Asa Haynes (1881–1940) was an American newspaper editor and government official who was United States Assistant Secretary of the Treasury in charge of Prohibition enforcement from 1920–1925. He was succeeded by political appointee Lincoln Clark Andrews, who reorganized the enforcement bureau. He was the editor of a daily newspaper in Hillsboro, Ohio. Haynes was appointed by Warren Harding and considered a puppet of the Anti-Saloon League.

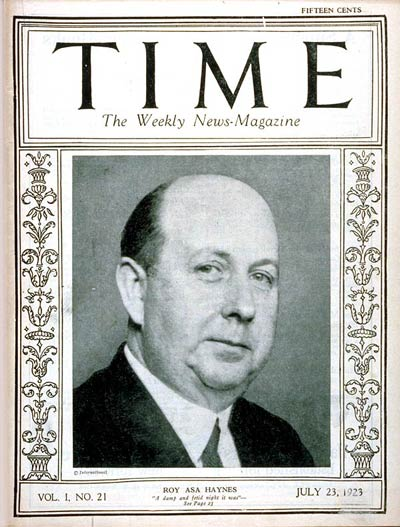
Time cover, 23 Jul 1923

Awards and achievements
Preceded by James J. Couzens	Cover of Time magazine 23 July 1923	Succeeded by Eleonora Duse
