= Rita Long Visitor Holy Dance =

Native American Oglala Lakota spiritual elder

- Born: Pine Ridge Reservation
- Occupations: Lakota keeper of the traditional ways, Activist, Native American Church elder
- Known for: Sitting on International Council of 13 Indigenous Grandmothers
- Parent: Antonia Long Visitor Holy Dance (mother)

Rita Long Visitor Holy Dance is a Native American spiritual elder who is a member of the Oglala Lakota Tribe and comes from the Pine Ridge Reservation in South Dakota. Through her work as an indigenous elder stateswoman, Rita has gained international recognition through her work as part of the International Council of 13 Indigenous Grandmothers - a group of spiritual elders, medicine women and wisdom keepers since its founding in 2004.

== Personal ==
Her older sister Beatrice waited for Rita to wed and they enjoyed a double wedding. She is a descendant of Long Visitor, and a member of the Crazy Horse Band. She works with a youth ambassador program for Lakota youth that connects them with their spiritual traditions, including the Sun Dance, and works to free youth from substance abuse. She has taught at the Omega Institute for Holistic Studies.

== The International Council of 13 Grandmothers ==
In 2004, Rita was approached by The Center for Sacred Studies to serve on the International Council of 13 Indigenous Grandmothers.
