= Samuel George Blythe =

American writer and newspaperman (1868–1947)

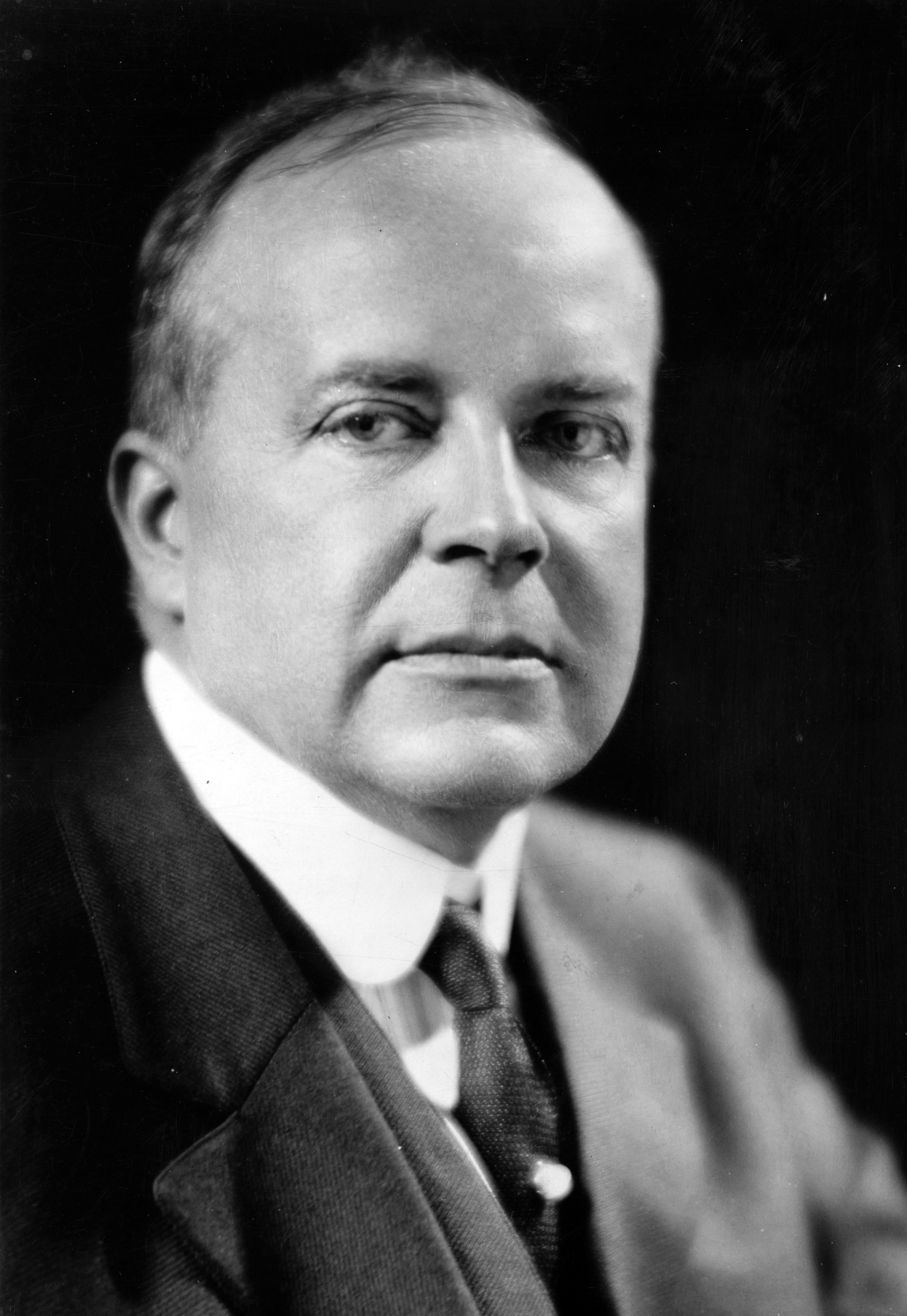
- Born: 1868
- Died: 1947 (aged 78–79)
- Occupations: Writer; newspaperman

Samuel George Blythe (May 19, 1868, in Geneseo, New York – July 17, 1947) was an American writer and newspaperman. In 1933 during the Great Depression he urged people to Buy American in The Saturday Evening Post.

He worked for several newspapers throughout his career, including the Buffalo Express and the New York World; he also edited Cosmopolitan.

== Publications ==
- Cutting It Out: How to Get on the Water Wagon and Stay There (1912)
- The Fun of Getting Thin: How to Be Happy and Reduce the Waist Line (1912)
- The Fakers (1914)
- The Old Game: A Retrospect After Three and a Half Years on the Water-Wagon (1914)
- Keeping Fit at Fifty (1921)
- Get Rid of that Fat (1928)

Awards and achievements
Preceded by Benito Mussolini	Cover of Time Magazine; 20 August 1923	Succeeded by F. E. Smith, 1st Earl of Birkenhead
