= Beatrice Long Visitor Holy Dance =

Native American spiritual elder (died 2016)

- Born: Pine Ridge Reservation
- Died: 2016
- Occupations: Lakota speaker, Activist, Field health care worker, member of Native American Church
- Known for: Member of International Council of 13 Indigenous Grandmothers, Opposing papal bulls authorizing the conversion and subjugation of indigenous peoples
- Height: 4 ft 10 in (147 cm)
- Mother: Antonia Long Visitor Holy Dance
- Relatives: Rita Long Visitor Holy Dance, Long Visitor, Loretta Long Visitor

Beatrice Long Visitor Holy Dance was an Oglala Lakota speaker and activist from the Pine Ridge Reservation in South Dakota, best known for her participation in the group known as the International Council of 13 Indigenous Grandmothers, which was founded in New York in 2004. In 2008, The 13 Indigenous Grandmothers, including Beatrice, hand delivered a petition to Pope Benedict XVI asking to revoke the three papal bulls authorizing the conversion and subjugation of the Indigenous Peoples of America. This letter went unanswered.

== Biography ==
Beatrice Long Visitor Holy Dance is daughter to Antonia Long Visitor Holy Dance and younger sister to Rita Long Visitor Holy Dance. Beatrice was sent to a Roman Catholic boarding school at age 7. After graduating, she and Rita worked in a potato field, earning 3 cents per bushel of potatoes. She and Rita wed in a double wedding.

She was a member of the Native American Church and a participant in ceremonies in her community. She worked in health care, with a focus on people with diabetes. She was part of a youth ambassador program with her sister that aimed to connect young people with Native American spirituality.

Among Beatrice's themes in her talks is forgiveness, something she has experience with. As a child, she watched as Christian missionaries stamped out the Lakota faith, and the federal government rounded up Lakotas and placed them on reservations. She also endured the murders of two of her children, one in 1994 and another in 2007. "I pray for the people who did that to them," Beatrice told me. "I pray that they have a clean soul and will someday be in the Creator's arms."

She drove a truck on the reservation for decades delivering medicines. In 2012 she hosted a workshop for girls on "how to properly cut buffalo meat and dry it."

== Quote ==
We have to keep repeating the prayers over and over again. When I reflect on my life of 79 years, I see a flat road of destruction. Youths are dying of drugs and ozone layer is depleting. The most powerful tool with us is to pray and pray with other communities for world peace.

== The International Council of 13 Grandmothers ==
In 2004, Beatrice was approached by the directors of The Center for Sacred Studies to join their group, the International Council of 13 Indigenous Grandmothers.

In 2009, The Gazette of Colorado Springs, Colorado described her schedule with the Grandmothers as "hectic", noting that she traveled by "Greyhound bus or car, driven by her daughter Loretta Long Visitor."

In 2008, she joined the 13 Grandmothers group in delivering a petition to Pope Benedict XVI in Vatican City by hand, requesting the Pope to revoke the three papal bulls authorizing the conversion and subjugation of the indigenous peoples of the Americas.

The Papal Bulls that the Grandmothers are demanding to be revoked are:

- Dum Diversas, June 18, 1452
- Romanus Pontifex, January 8, 1455
- Inter Caetera, May 4, 1493

The Grandmothers received no response after this request.

However, the letter which Beatrice Long Visitor Holy Dance wrote on this topic was featured on the National Catholic Reporter website, under the title "The past is a very living thing: Try not to forget it."

She was interviewed about her work with the 13 Grandmothers group by the Women Rising Radio Project in 2011.

== Death ==
Beatrice Long Visitor Holy Dance died in 2016; her life was celebrated for four days from 25 August to 28 August 2016 with a Creation to Completion Ceremony in Phoenicia, New York where the grandmothers group first began their mission.
