= Francis Scott McBride =

American religious leader (1872–1955)

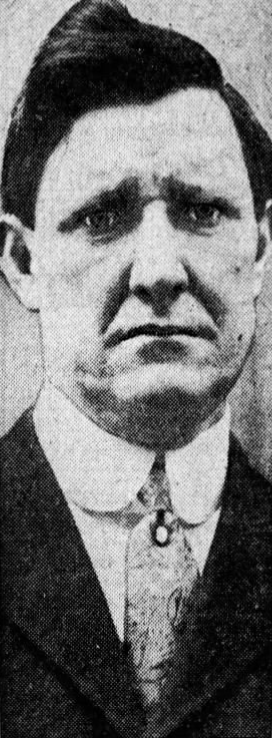
- McBride (c. 1927)
- Born: July 28, 1872; Carroll County, Ohio, U.S.
- Died: April 23, 1955 (aged 82)
- Education: Muskingum College (BS)

Francis Scott McBride (July 28, 1872 – April 23, 1955) was a Presbyterian minister active in the Anti-Saloon League. He featured on the cover of Time magazine on 3 June 1929.

== Early life and education ==
McBride was born in Carroll County, Ohio on July 29, 1872, to Francis McBride, who was an iron molder, and Harriet Miller. He attended Muskingum College, where he received a B.S. in 1898, and United Presbyterian Theological School for three years. In 1901, he was ordained.

== Anti-Saloon League ==
After an eight years in the United Presbyterian Church of Kittanning Pennsylvania and a two years at Monmouth, Illinois, McBride was selected into the Anti-Saloon League in 1911. He became assistant superintendent in 1912 and then held the position of superintendent for the next twelve years. In 1924, he became national superintendent replacing Purley Baker.

After Prohibition was repealed, McBride remained the national superintendent.
