= Mona Polacca =

Native American spiritual elder

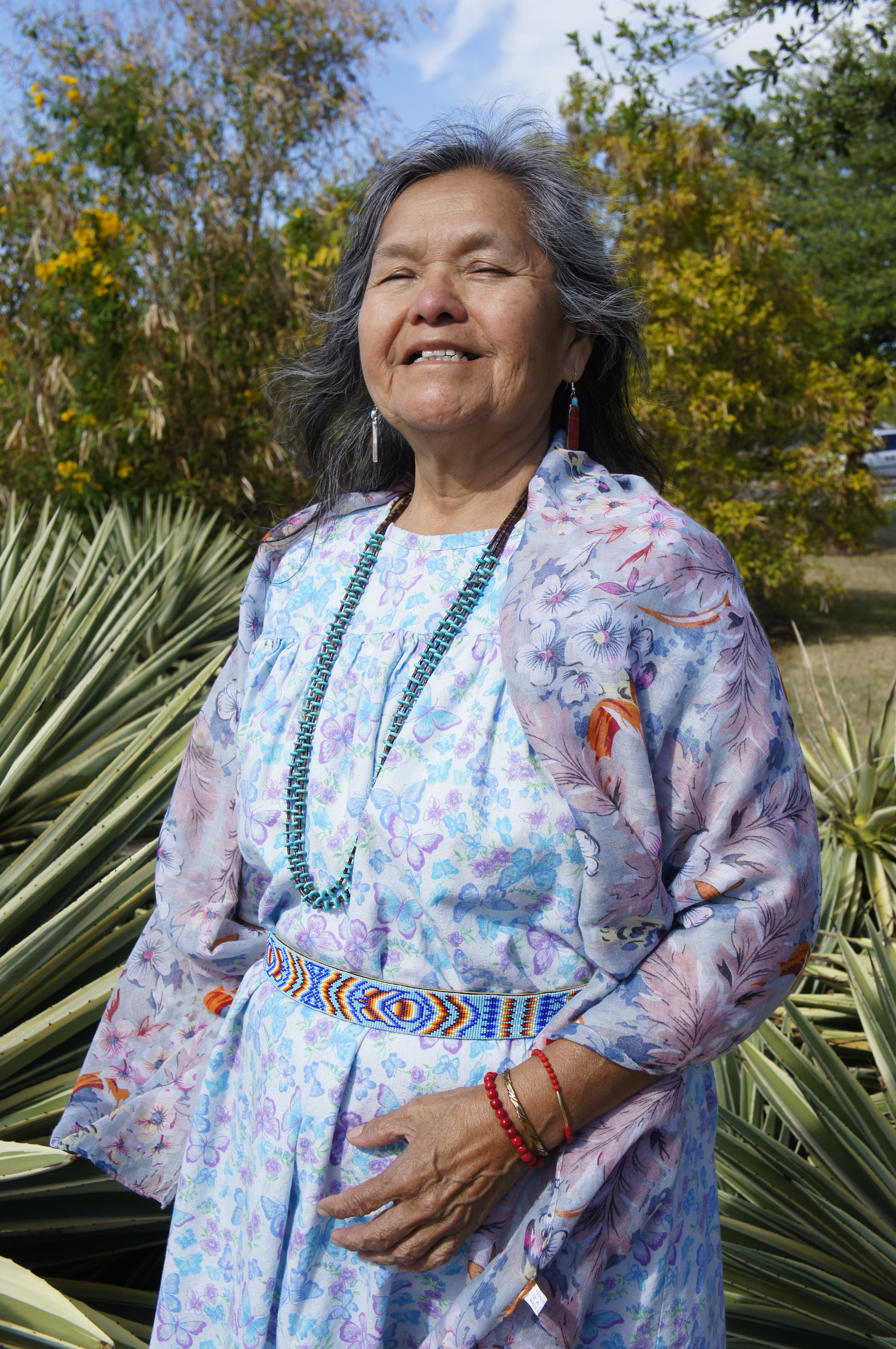
- Mona Polacca in 2017

Hopi/Havasupai/Tewa elder

Personal details
- Born: January 22, 1955 (age 71)
- Relations: Manakaja, chief of Havasupai from 1900 to 1942
- Education: Arizona State University Virginia Commonwealth University

Mona Polacca is a Native American spiritual elder from Arizona. She has worked to further social justice for indigenous people from an early age. She is an author in the field of social sciences, has held posts of responsibility as Treasurer for her tribe, served on several committees for Indigenous Peoples within the United Nations. and is widely known for her "leadership in the Native American revitalisation movement."

In recent years, Mona has gained international recognition for her work as one of the International Council of 13 Indigenous Grandmothers – a group of spiritual elders, medicine women and wisdom keepers founded in 2004.

In 2021, she joined the Center for Earth Ethics at Union Theological Seminary (New York City) as a senior fellow for the Original Caretakers Program.

== Early years ==
Mona became interested in indigenous social justice at the age of 14 when she first heard about the occupation of Alcatraz Island by a Native American group called Indians of All Tribes in 1969. Although Mona was only 14 years old she wanted to visit the island and was allowed to do so by her parents. "Blessed with the gift of nearperfect oral memory, her elders spent hours teaching her the old ways and prophecies word for word, trusting their information would be safe in her hands."

She has been part of the Native American Church since 1978.

== Social justice work ==
Mona has held many positions relating to social justice including:

- Serving as a U.S. delegate at the Indigenous Women's Inter-Continental Meeting in Lima, Peru
- Serving on United Nations committees on indigenous people's issues. However, Mona has noted that although a draft on Indigenous Human Rights has been created, the draft has never been approved or adopted. Mona wishes for the draft to be brought back and considered by the General Assembly.
- On the Board of Directors of Youth Advocate Programs Inc. In her work, Mona helps to "create opportunities to help them develop positive self identity."

She has done "research in the social sciences on alcoholism, domestic violence, and culturally appropriate treatments for Native Americans," and work on health issues with the Inter Tribal Council of Arizona, Inc.

As of 2013, she was working on a Ph.D. in the Interdisciplinary Justice Studies department at Arizona State University.

== The International Council of 13 Grandmothers ==
In 2004, Mona was approached by The Center for Sacred Studies to serve on the International Council of 13 Indigenous Grandmothers. Grandmother Mona is the youngest of the 13 Grandmothers

She was a member of the International Council of Thirteen Indigenous Grandmothers 2008 delegation to Rome, Italy to address the Vatican papal bull authorizing "conversion" of the indigenous peoples of the Americas.

On April 8, 2021 she delivered a lecture via zoom about the Indigenous Grandmother’s Council for the University of Redlands NSP.

== Works ==
- "Violence and trauma". Primary care of Native American patients: diagnosis, therapy, and epidemiology. Boston: Butterworth-Heinemann. 1999. ISBN 0750699892.
- Bletzer, Keith V., Nicole P. Yuan, Mary P. Koss, Mona Polacca, Emery R. Eaves, and David Goldman. "Taking Humor Seriously: Talking about Drinking in Native American Focus Groups." Medical anthropology 30, no. 3 (2011): 295–318.
- Polacca, Mona. "NATIVE AMERICANS." Age Through Ethnic Lenses: Caring for the Elderly in a Multicultural Society (2001): 113.
- Nicole P. Yuan, Mary P. Koss, Mona Polacca, and David Goldman, “Risk Factors for Physical Assault and Rape among Six Native American Tribes,” Journal of Interpersonal Violence 21, no. 12 (2006): 1566–90

== Other sources ==
- Grandmothers' Council website about the Grandmothers
- Native Village Publications, Grandmother Bernadette Rebienot
- Schaefer, C. (2006). Grandmothers Council the World: wise women elders offer their vision for our planet. Trumpeter Books. ISBN 978-1-59030-293-4.
- Harcourt-Smith, J. Future Primitive on the international council of thirteen indigenous grandmothers
- Youth Advocate Programs Inc.
