= Lincoln Clark Andrews =

American Assistant Secretary of the Treasury

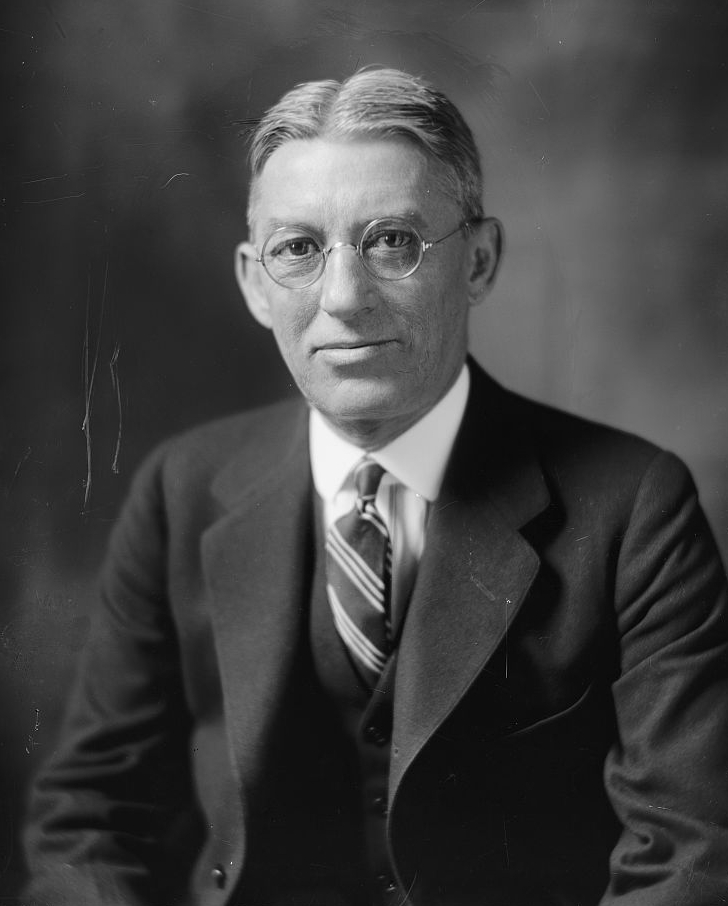

Assistant Secretary of the Treasury in charge of Prohibition enforcement
- In office April 1, 1925 – August 1, 1927
- President: Calvin Coolidge
- Preceded by: Roy Asa Haynes
- Succeeded by: Seymour Lowman

Personal details
- Born: November 21, 1867 Owatonna, Minnesota, U.S.
- Died: November 23, 1950 (aged 83) Northampton, Massachusetts, U.S.
- Spouse: Charlotte Graves
- Children: 1
- Education: Cornell University; United States Military Academy

Military service
- Allegiance: United States
- Branch/service: United States Army
- Years of service: 1893–1919
- Rank: Brigadier general
- Commands: 86th Infantry Division
- Battles/wars: Spanish–American War; Moro Rebellion; World War I
- Awards: Distinguished Service Medal; Citation Star (2); Legion of Honour

Lincoln Clark Andrews (November 21, 1867 – November 23, 1950) was a brigadier general in the United States Army during World War I and Assistant Secretary of the Treasury starting in 1925. As Assistant Secretary of the Treasury, he was in charge of Prohibition enforcement. Time magazine called his forces the Prohibition Army.

== Early life ==
He was born on November 21, 1867, in Owatonna, Minnesota, to Charles T. Andrews and Mary Clark Andrews. He attended Cornell University from 1888 to 1889.

== Military career ==
He attended the United States Military Academy, graduating number thirteen of fifty-one in 1893. As a 2nd lieutenant, he commanded Troop G of the 3rd Cavalry, with which he served during the Pullman Strike riots in Chicago in 1894.

During the Spanish–American War, he served as an aide to Gen. Edwin Vose Sumner, the commanding general of the cavalry division. After brief service as an instructor of physics at the United States Military Academy, he served in the Philippines as governor of the island of Leyte from 1899 to 1903 and participated in the campaign against the Moros. He returned to the Academy in 1903 to teach cavalry tactics, and from 1911 to 1915, he taught cavalry tactics for the New York National Guard and also at the training camp near Plattsburgh, New York. After returning to the Philippines in 1916 and 1917 to train the Philippine National Guard Division, he was promoted to lieutenant colonel on June 28, 1917, shortly after the American entry into World War I.

After his promotion to brigadier general, Andrews commanded the 172nd Infantry Brigade, 86th Division at Camp Grant, Illinois. He took this brigade to France in August 1918. Following the armistice, he served as deputy provost marshal general at general headquarters until it was disbanded. He retired at his own request after 30 years of service on September 30, 1919. His rank of brigadier general was restored by act on Congress in June 1930.

=== His publications ===
- Basic Course for Cavalry, 1914
- Fundamentals of Military Service, 1916
- Leadership and Military Training, 1918
- Man Power, 1921
- Military Man Power, 1921

=== Awards ===
- Distinguished Service Medal
- Silver Star
- Legion of Honour
- Order of the Crown of Italy

== Later Life ==
=== Political career ===
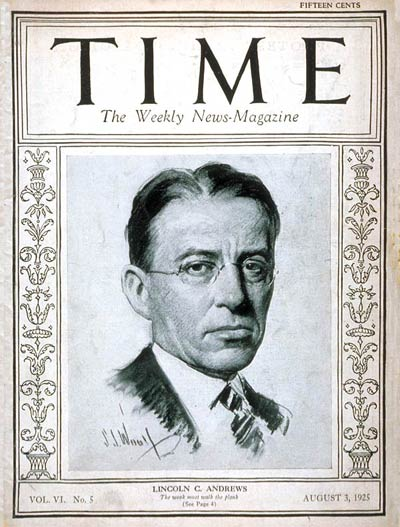
Time cover, 3 Aug 1925

Andrews held the office of Assistant Secretary of the Treasury in charge of Prohibition enforcement, his term began in March 1925, after Roy Asa Haynes. He immediately began to reorganize the bureau in 1925, resulting in the layoffs of numerous senior agents, including Izzy Einstein and Moe Smith in New York, who were nationally the most successful and famous . Andrews saw Prohibition enforcement as strict law enforcement and was not an ideological adherent to the dry movement. Andrews served until August 1, 1927.

=== Post political career ===
From November 1, 1927 to June 1928, he was the president of Guardian Investment Trust in Hartford, Connecticut.

In June 1928, he became president of the Rubber Institute.

=== Death and legacy ===
He died on November 23, 1950 in Northampton, Massachusetts.

== Personal life ==
He married Charlotte Graves on October 5, 1899. They had one son: John G. Andrews. He lived in Grand Isle, Vermont.

== Bibliography ==
- Davis, Henry Blaine Jr. Generals in Khaki. Raleigh, NC: Pentland Press, 1998. ISBN 1571970886 OCLC 231779136
- Who Was Who in American History – the Military. Chicago: Marquis Who's Who. 1975. ISBN 0837932017.
