= Purley Baker =

Purley Albert Baker
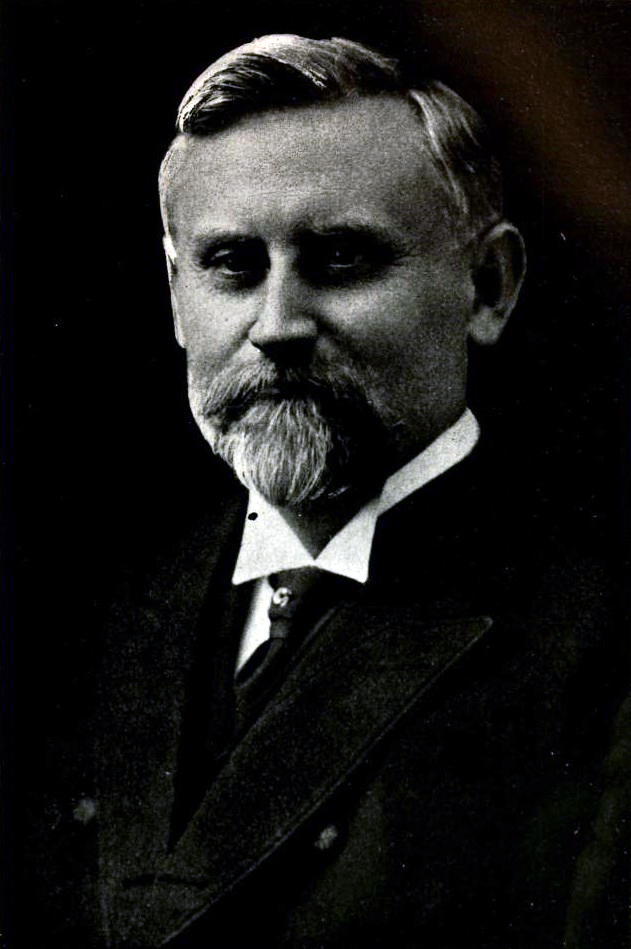
- Born: April 10, 1858; Liberty Township, Ohio
- Died: March 30, 1924 (aged 65); Westerville, Ohio
- Occupation: Clergyman
- Spouse: Lillie I. Greene (m. 1884)

Purley Albert Baker (1858—1924) was an ordained Methodist minister who strongly opposed any consumption of alcoholic beverages and was superintendent of the Ohio Anti-Saloon League.

== Biography ==
Purley Baker was born in Liberty Township, Jackson County, Ohio, on April 10, 1858. His father died when he was ten years old, and he began working on farms to support himself. At age 17, he attended a revival meeting in Williamsport and converted to Methodism. He attended school in Xenia, read law with a judge in Circleville, and entered the ministry at age 25.

He married Lillie I. Greene at Washington Court House, Ohio, on August 27, 1884.

He became head of the national Anti-Saloon League in 1903, and five years later created the League's Industrial Relations Department to promote the idea that imposing prohibition would be a good business investment. He raised large sums of money to create a major information campaign, an important component of which was to demonize the producers of alcoholic beverages.

He announced his resignation as general superintendent of the League on March 8, 1924, for reasons of ill health. He died at his home in Westerville, Ohio, on March 30.

== See also ==
- Temperance Row Historic District
