= International Council of Thirteen Indigenous Grandmothers =

Women's council on social issues

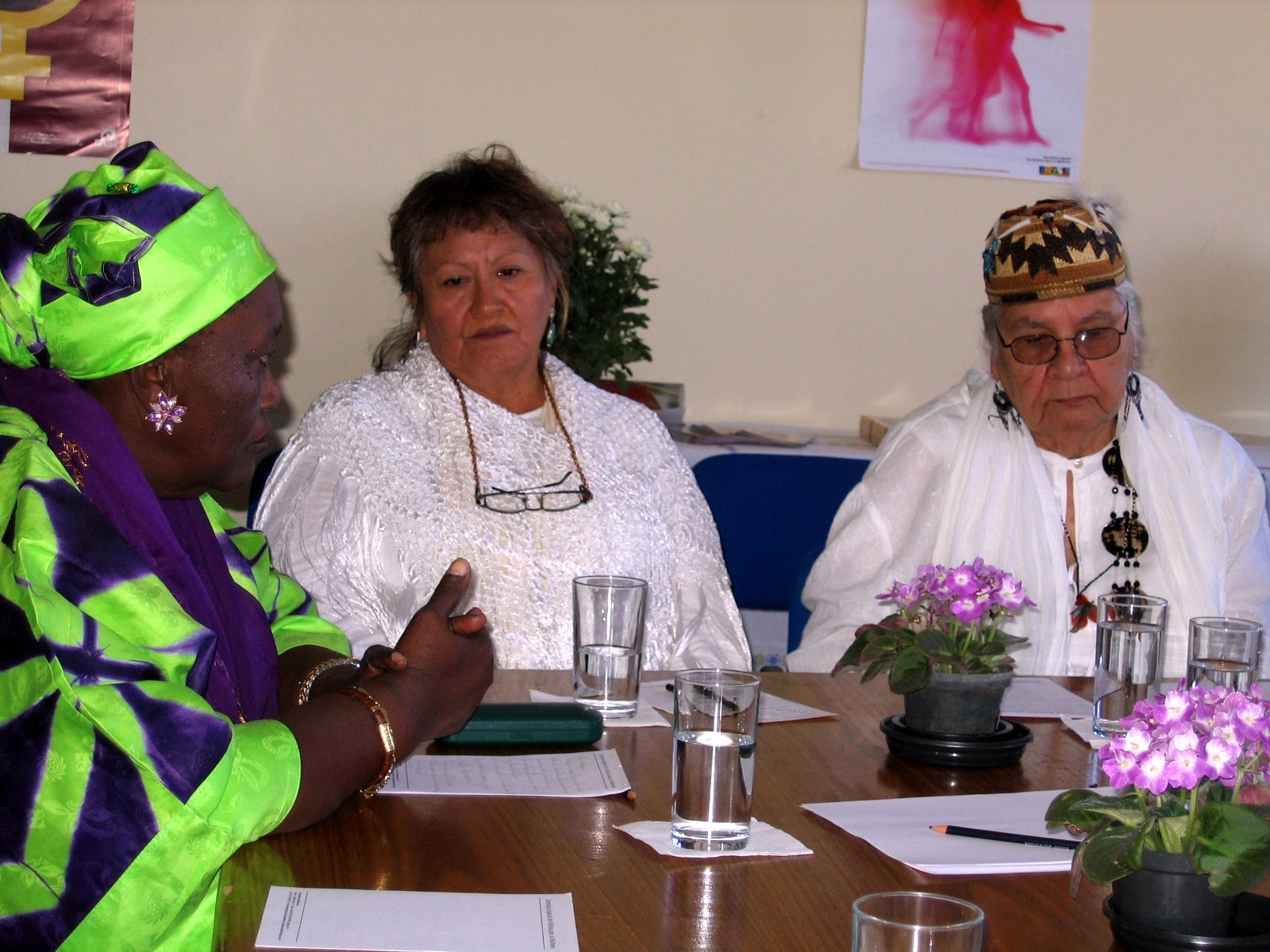
- Founded: 2004
- Type: Non-profit
- Purpose: Environmentalism, internationalism, indigenous rights, cooperation and peace
- Location: Sonora, California
- Website: www.grandmotherscouncil.com

The International Council of Thirteen Indigenous Grandmothers is an international alliance of indigenous female elders that focuses on issues such as the environment, internationalism, and human rights. The group met for the first time in October 2004 at the Dalai Lama's Menla Retreat Center on Panther Mountain in Phoenicia, New York, during which time they declared themselves a council. Academic Suzanne Bouclin described them as "an alliance of thirteen women elders from across the globe that was organized to uphold indigenous practices and ceremonies and affirm the right to use plant medicines free of legal restriction."

== Council members ==
The grandmothers include:

- Aama Bombo – Tamang – Nepal
- Flordemayo – Mayan – Highlands of Central America/ New Mexico
- Maria Alice Campos Freire – Amazonian Rainforest, Brazil
- Rita Long Visitor Holy Dance – Oglala Lakota – Black Hills, South Dakota, USA
- Clara Shinobu Iura – Amazonian Rainforest, Brazil
- Rose Bernadette Rebienot Owansango– Omyene – Gabon, Africa

=== Former members ===
- Margaret Behan – Arapaho/Cheyenne – Montana, USA
- Rita Pitka Blumenstein – Yup’ik – Alaska, USA (deceased)
- Julieta Casimiro Estrada – Mazatec – Huautla de Jimenez, Mexico (deceased)
- Tsering Dolma Gyaltong – Tibetan (deceased)
- Beatrice Long Visitor Holy Dance – Oglala Lakota – Black Hills, South Dakota, USA (deceased)
- Mona Polacca – Hopi/Havasupai/Tewa – Arizona, USA
- Agnes Baker Pilgrim (Elected Chairperson) – Takelma, Confederated Tribes of Siletz – Grants Pass, Oregon, USA (deceased)

=== Ambassadors ===
Several others have been involved in supporting the council's work, including:

- Pauline Tangiora – Māori elder from New Zealand and councillor of World Future Council
- Jeneane Prevatt ("Jyoti") – 'Traveling Ambassador Charged with The Mission'
- Madrinha Rita Gregório – Amazon rainforest, Brazil
- Constance de Pauliac – France

== Council meetings ==
The council meets every six months, visiting each other's homelands. Their goals are to "build our relations and learn about each other's cultures". During these meetings the grandmothers wear traditional dress and hold a seven-day prayer vigil. The 2007 meeting in the Black Hills of South Dakota brought together 250 participants from the United States, South America, Europe, Asia and Oceania.

In July 2008 the council met in Rome to address the Vatican regarding the Inter caetera, a Papal Bull of 1493 that authorized the conversion to Christianity of the indigenous people of the newly discovered Americas. They laid a "flag of peace and conciliation" in front of Saint Peter's Basilica, as well as a written statement and gifts to Pope Benedict XVI. The grandmothers also lit smudging incense and prayed. The Vatican declined to receive them.

== Media ==
In 2006 Carol Schaefer's book Grandmothers Counsel the World: Women Elders Offer Their Vision for Our Planet was published by Trumpeter Books, an imprint of Shambhala Publications. In 2009 it released a Kindle edition. A Spanish edition was published in 2008.

In 2007 the Center for Sacred Studies, the parent organization of the Grandmother's Council, produced a documentary titled For the Next 7 Generations: The Grandmothers Speak. Directed by Carole Hart, it documented the Grandmothers as they met and traveled around the world.

Fran Markover's poem about the group, The Grandmothers, is based on a quote by Bernadette Rebienot. It won first place in the 2008 Ithaca College magazine arts and literature contest.

In 2011 Rita Pitka Blumenstein from Alaska and Mona Polacca from Arizona started a 22-city "Timeless Message Tour" speaking about the group and showing "For the Next 7 Generations".

== Awards ==
In 2013, the Fellowship of Reconciliation awarded the Council of Thirteen Indigenous Grandmothers the International Pfeffer Peace Award for their work for peace and justice throughout the world.
