= Canary =

Canary originally referred to the Spanish island of Gran Canaria in the North Atlantic Ocean and the surrounding Canary Islands. It may also refer to:

== Animals ==
=== Birds ===
- Canaries, birds in the genera Serinus and Crithagra including, among others:
  - Atlantic canary (Serinus canaria), a small wild bird
    - Domestic canary, Serinus canaria domestica, a small pet or aviary bird, also responsible for the "canary yellow" color term
  - Yellow canary (Crithagra flaviventris), a small bird

=== Fish ===
- Canary damsel (Similiparma lurida), fish of the family Pomacentridae, found in the eastern Atlantic Ocean
- Canary moray (Gymnothorax bacalladoi), an eel of the family Muraenidae
- Canary rockfish (Sebastes pinniger), of the family Sebastidae, found in the northeast Pacific Ocean

== People ==
- Canary Burton (born 1942), American keyboardist, composer and writer
- Canary Conn (born 1949), American entertainer and author
- Bill Canary (fl. 1994), Republican campaign consultant in Alabama, Georgia, U.S.
- Richard Canary (born in 1962), American mathematician at the University of Michigan
- David Canary (1938–2015), American actor

== Places ==
- Canary District, a housing development in Toronto, Canada
- Canary Islands, Spain
- Canary Wharf, Isle of Dogs, London, United Kingdom

== Arts and entertainment ==
- Black Canary, a DC Comics superhero, first appeared in 1947
  - Sara Lance/The Canary, a character on the television series Arrow, based on the DC Comics character
- Canary, a character in the manga and anime series Hunter × Hunter
- Canary dance, a Renaissance dance popular in Europe in the 16th and 17th centuries
- "Canary" (NCIS), a 2013 episode of the American television series NCIS
- "The Canary" (short story), 1923 short story by Katherine Mansfield
- Canary (visual novel), released in 2000

== Technology ==
- Canary release, a deployment cycle used by software developers to gradually roll out new features to a limited number of users
  - Google Chrome Canary, pre-release version of the Chrome browser
- HTC Canary, the first smartphone to run Windows Mobile, released in November 2002
- Canary value, a buffer overflow protection method in computer programming

== Other uses ==
- Canary, LLC, an oilfield services company
- The Canary (website), a news media outlet created in 2015
- Canary melon, a yellow fruit
- Canary Current, a wind-driven surface current that is part of the North Atlantic Gyre
- Canaries, players for or supporters of Norwich City F.C.
- Canary sack, white fortified wine (sack) imported from the Canary Islands
- Canary wood (disambiguation), a name used to describe wood from a number of tree species
- Canary yellow, a shade of yellow
- Warrant canary, a published statement, the removal of which indicates the publisher received a National Security Letter

== See also ==
- Canaries (disambiguation)
- Canary trap, a method for exposing an information leak
- Sentinel species, such as the "canary in a coal mine"
- Calamity Jane Cannary (1852–1903), American frontierswoman
- Canarinho ("Little canary"), Brazilian football association team's nickname
- José Alberto "El Canario" (born 1958), Dominican salsa singer
- Conary (disambiguation)
