= Stephen Williams =

Stephen or Steven Williams may refer to:

== Arts and entertainment ==
- Stephen Williams (director) (born 1978), Canadian film and television director
- Stephen Williams (musician), double-bass player associated with the Michael Nyman Band
- Stephen Williams (The Real World)
- Stephen Williams (Radio Luxembourg) (1908–1994), British radio announcer
- Stephen Williams (writer)
- Steven Williams (born 1949), actor
- Stephen Williams (fashion designer) (born 1964), celebrity fashion designer
- Stephen W. Williams (1837–1899), British civil engineer and architect
- Stevie Stone (Stephen Williams, born 1981), American rapper
- Stephen Tyrone Williams (born 1982), American actor
- Steven Williams (singer) (born 1957), English singer and artist known as Steve Ignorant
- Steven A. Williams (born 1965), musician, composer, record producer and engineer
- Steven Jason Williams (born 1974), American YouTube personality known as Boogie2988

== Sports ==
- Stephen Williams (cricketer, born 1954), former Gloucestershire cricketer
- Stephen Williams (cricketer, born 1967), former Cornwall cricketer
- Stephen Williams (figure skater) (born 1960), British ice dancer
- Stephen Williams (footballer) (born 1961), former Australian Rules Football player and coach
- Stephen Williams (wide receiver) (born 1986), American football wide receiver
- Stephen Williams (cyclist) (born 1996), British cyclist
- Steven Williams (snowboarder) (born 1988), Argentine snowboarder
- Stephen Williams (bowler) (born 1973), Welsh bowls player
- Steven Williams, known as Stone Cold Steve Austin (born 1964), professional wrestler

== Government ==
- Stephen Williams (British politician) (born 1966), British MP for Bristol West
- Stephen F. Williams (1936-2020), United States federal judge
- Stephen K. Williams (1819–1916), New York lawyer and politician
- Stephen T. Williams, mayor of Huntington, West Virginia

== Other ==
- Stephen Williams (archaeologist) (1926–2017), archaeologist at Harvard University
- Steven R. Williams, convicted murderer; see John McDonogh High School shooting
- Steven Williams (executive), American businessman
- Stephen Williams (murder victim), lynched in Upper Marlboro Maryland on October 20, 1894
- Stephen Williams (minister) (1694–1782), Congregational minister
- Stephen N. Williams (born 1959), theologian

== See also ==
- Steve Williams (disambiguation)
- Stephon Williams (born 1993), American ice hockey goaltender
