= Conary =

Conary may refer to:

- Conary (package manager), a package management system created by rPath
- Conaire or Conary, an Irish name

== See also ==
- Canary (disambiguation)
- Connery
