= Emma Lee Benedict =

American writer

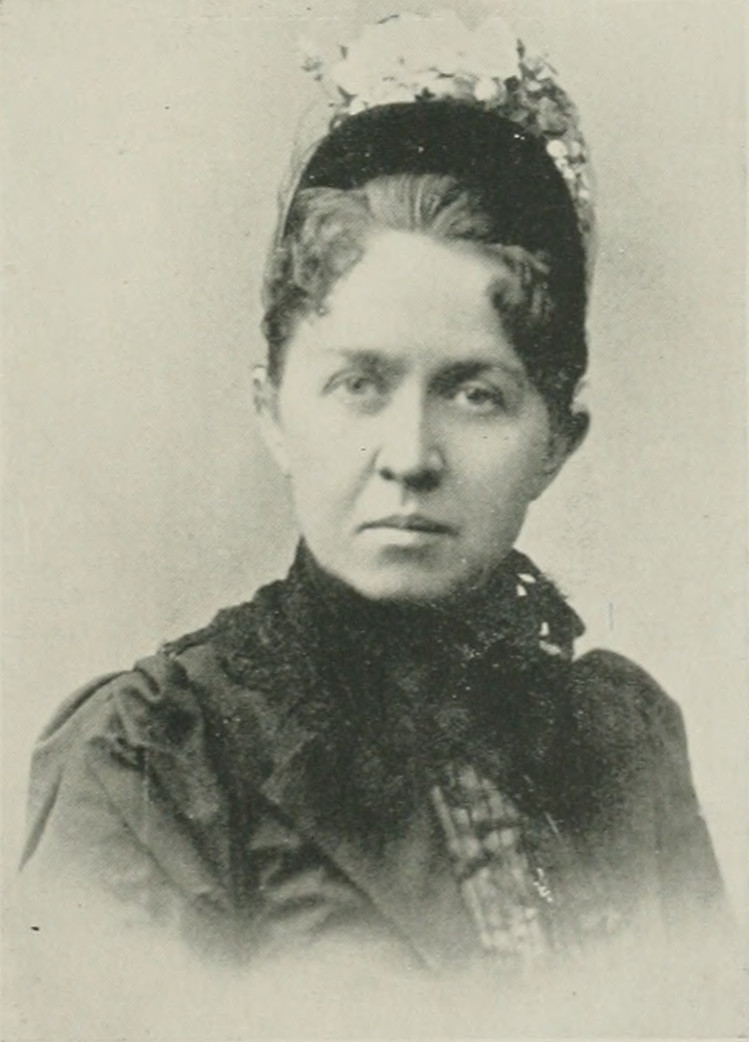
- Photo in A Woman of the Century
- Born: Emma Lee Benedict; November 16, 1857; Clifton Park, New York, U.S.
- Died: February 3, 1937 (aged 79); Boston, Massachusetts, U.S.
- Resting place: Clifton Park Cemetery
- Occupations: author; magazine editor; educator
- Spouse: Charles Frederick Transeau (m. 1895)
- Writing career
- Pen name: E. L. Benedict; E. L. B. Transeau
- Genres: children's literature; non-fiction
- Subject: temperance
- Movement: Third wave temperance

Emma Lee Benedict (née, Benedict; after marriage, Transeau; pen names, E. L. Benedict and E. L. B. Transeau; November 16, 1857 – February 3, 1937) was an American magazine editor, educator, and the author of several books of prose and poetry between 1887 and 1918. She was a pleasant, logical and forcible speaker and writer in her special line of educational and scientific topics, particularly third-wave temperance, and was in frequent demand as an instructor at teachers' institutes.

== Early life and education ==
Emma Lee (sometimes recorded as "Lydia") Benedict was born in Clifton Park, New York, November 16, 1857. Her parents were Stephen Benedict (1821-1906) and Sarah Crosby (d. 1862). As the daughter of a farmer, she gained a love for nature as well as the foundations of robust health and a good physique. Always fond of books, at the age of twelve years she had read nearly everything in her father's small but well-selected library. She had at least two brothers, Hiram A. Benedict and Luther P. Benedict.

At school, she was able to keep pace with pupils much older than herself, besides finding time for extra studies. Her first introduction to science was through an old schoolbook of her mother's, entitled Familiar Science, and another on natural philosophy, which she carried to school and begged her teacher to hear her recite from. A graduate of the Clifton Park Academy, she began to teach at the age of seventeen, and the following year entered the State Normal College at Albany (now the State University of New York, Albany), from which she was graduated in 1879.

== Career ==
After a few more years of successful teaching, she began to write for educational papers and was soon called to a position on the editorial staff of the New York School Journal, where she remained for more than three years. A desire for more extended opportunities for study and a broader scope for literary work led her to resign that position and begin to focus on miscellaneous literature. A very successful book by her, Stories of Persons and Places in Europe (New York, 1887), was published in the following year, besides stories, poems and miscellaneous articles which appeared in various standard publications.

Benedict was a member of the first class in pedagogy that entered the pedagogical course in the University of the City of New York.

Through contributions to the daily papers and interviews with leading educational people, she was an active factor in bringing about the general educational awakening in New York City, in 1888, which resulted in the formation of a new society for the advancement of education. Just at that time, she was sent for by Mary H. Hunt, national and international superintendent of the department of scientific temperance instruction of the Woman's Christian Temperance Union (WCTU), to go to Washington, D.C. and assist in the revision of temperance physiologies, which had then been submitted to Hunt for that purpose by several of the leading publishers of temperance textbooks. In Washington, Benedict spent a number of months in the United States Medical Library, occupied in investigating and compiling the testimony of leading medical writers concerning the nature and effects of alcohol upon the human body. The researches there begun were subsequently carried on in Boston and New York libraries and by correspondence with leading medical and chemical authorities. At the time, there was probably no other person more familiar than she with the whole subject of the nature and effects of alcohol upon the human system.

In 1893, Benedict was with Hunt, in the home of the latter in Hyde Park, Massachusetts, assisting in laying out courses of study for institute instructors and preparing manuals for the use of teachers on the subject of physiology and hygiene and the effects of narcotics. Benedict wrote a biography on Mary Hunt for the Scientific Temperance Federation Series.

Benedict co-edited a temperance publication, which, in 1906, became the Scientific Temperance Journal with Benedict as managing editor. She also served as research secretary, Scientific Temperance Federation; director, scientific temperance instruction department, Massachusetts WCTU (1920–27); and director, scientific temperance investigation bureau, national WCTU. When the Scientific Temperance Association was reincorporated in Boston in 1906 as an independent organization, Benedict was a charter member.

== Personal life ==
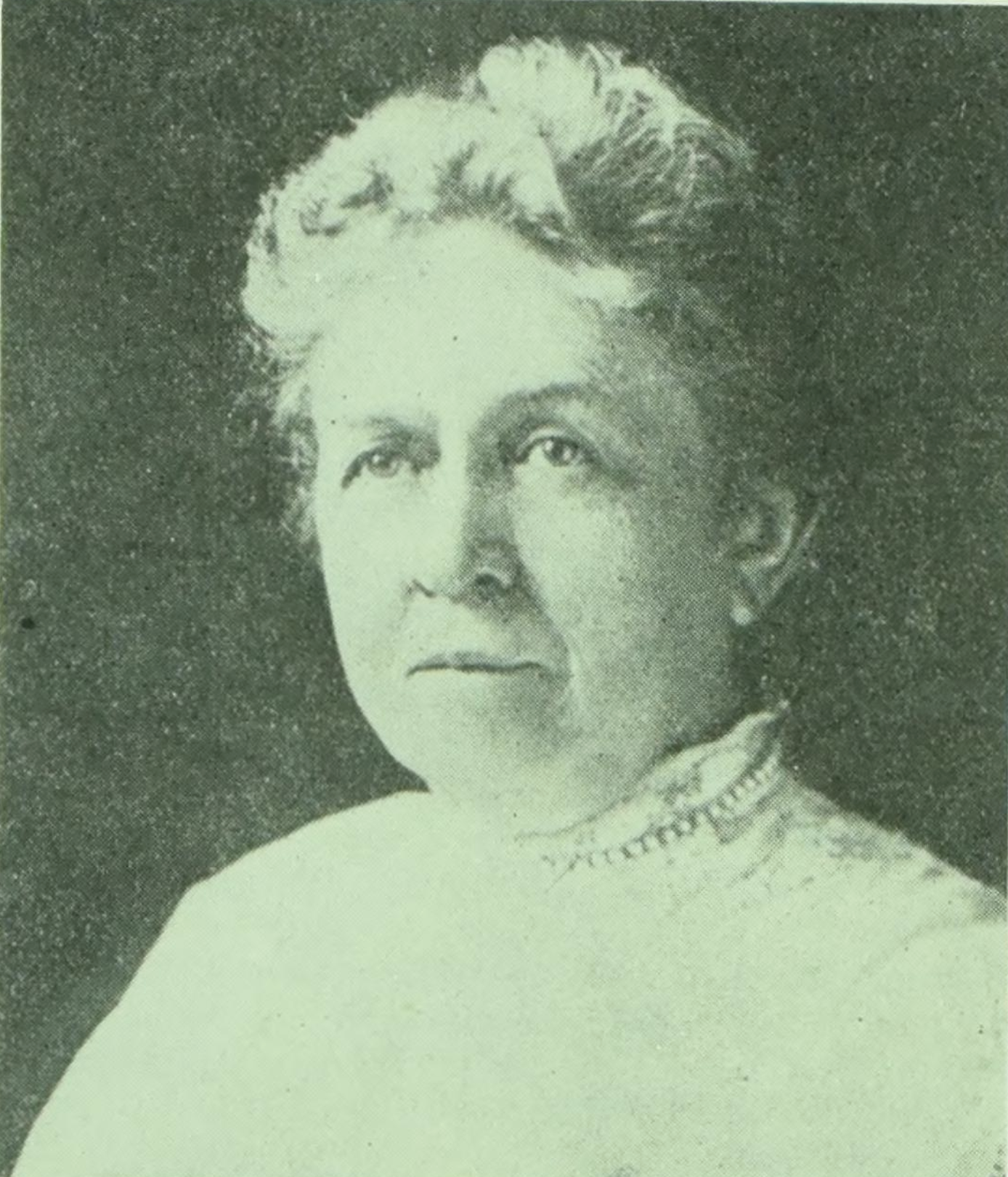
Photo in a 1930 publication.

In 1895, she married Charles Frederick Transeau, of Pofftown, North Carolina. (Note: In The Garnsey-Guernsey Genealogy: An Account of Thirteen Generations of Descendants from Henry Garnsey ( -1692) of Dorchester, Mass., and Joseph Guernsie-Garnsey ( -1688) of Stamford, Conn (1979), Judith L. Young-Thayer noted that Benedict first married L. B. Transeau, and second married, Charles Frederick of Pofton, North Carolina. This appears to be an error on the part of Young-Thayer, e.g. confusing "L. B." with Emma's middle and maiden names.) After marriage, she wrote under the names, "E. L. B. Transeau" or "Emma L. Transeau"

Benedict died at the Pioneer Club of Boston, February 3, 1937. Interment was in New York, at Clifton Park Cemetery.

== Selected works ==
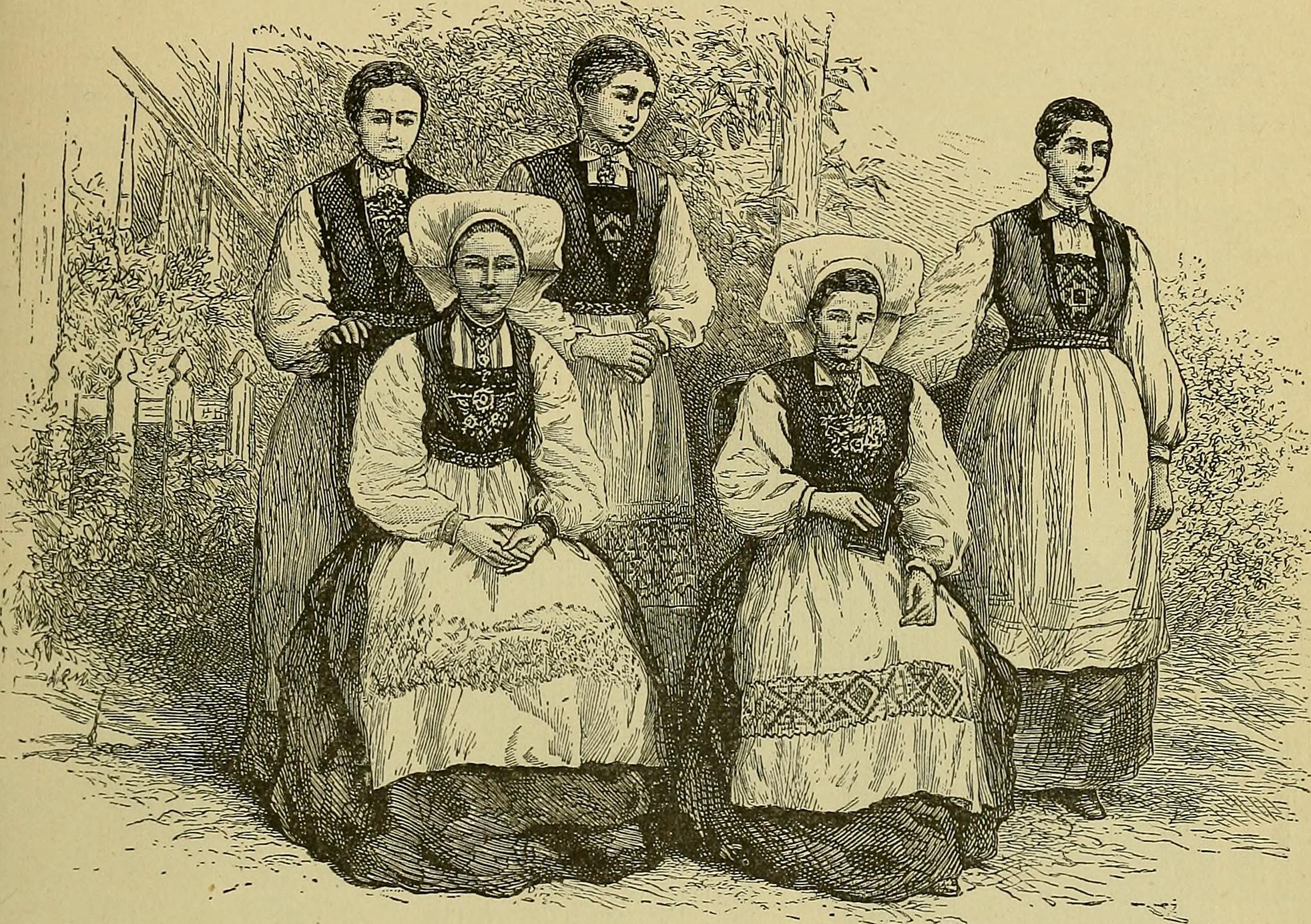
Illustration from Stories of persons and places in Europe (1887)

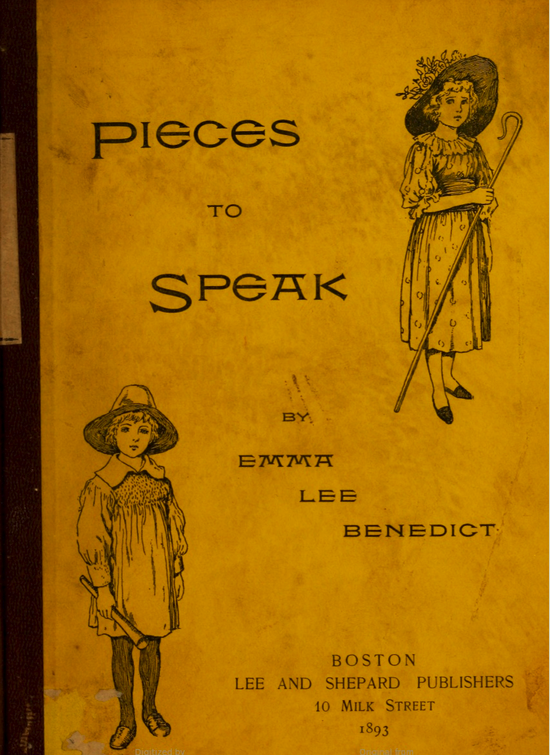
Pieces to Speak (1893)

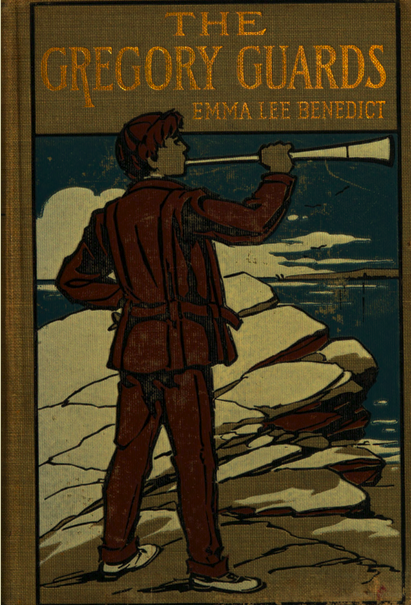
The Gregory Guards (1893)

- Stories of Persons and Places in Europe, (as E. L. Benedict; 1887)
- Pieces to Speak, (as Emma Lee Benedict; 1893)
- How Philip found a job when jobs were scarce, 19--
- They want your money, 191--
- The cost of a wrong opinion, 19--
- Three young Americans in action; stories of a big boy, a little boy and a middle-sized girl, 19--
- The Gregory Guards: A Boys' Club which Made Men, 1905 (illustrated by Frank Thayer Merrill)
- Father's day at the baby show, 1918

=== Articles ===
- "Wet arguments and dry answers", ?
- "False claims for wine", 1908
- "Wine to drive out drunkenness", 1908
- "An Ally of Tuberculosis", 191-
- "Alcohol as a cause of insanity", 1911
- "Some modern facts about alcoholic drinks", 1911 (with Cora Frances Stoddard)
- "Alcohol in every-day life", 1913 (with Cora Frances Stoddard)
- "Alcohol and the babies", 1916
- "The effect of alcohol upon the work of typewriting", 1916
- "Army experiences with drink", 1917
- "Some diseases of mature life", 1918
- "Drinking to avoid drunkenness is not the whole story", 1924
- "Effects of alcoholic drinks : a review", 1931
- "Yes, ethyl alcohol is a poison", 1932
- "Effects of a lcoholic drink : A review.", 1933
- "Knotty problems regarding moderate drinking", 1935
