= Connery =

Connery is an Irish surname from County Waterford and Wexford. It is the anglicised form of Gaelic Ó Conaire 'descendant of Conaire', a name meaning 'keeper of the hound'. Notable people with the surname include:

- Edward Connery (1933–2019), Canadian politician
- Gary Connery (born 1970), British skydiver and stuntman
- Jason Connery (born 1963), English actor and director, son of Sean Connery
- Lawrence J. Connery (1895–1941), American politician, brother of William P. Connery Jr. and son of William P. Connery Sr.
- Matt Connery, bass player in the American indie rock band Pile
- Neil Connery (1938–2021), Scottish actor, brother of Sean Connery
- Neil Connery, ITV News correspondent working on Yemen and other topics
- Sean Connery (1930–2020), Scottish actor and producer; brother of Neil Connery and father of Jason Connery
- William Joseph Connery, who helped silent film era actor Sessue Hayakawa acquire the money to form his own production company
- William P. Connery Jr. (1888–1937), American politician, brother of Lawrence J. Connery and son of William P. Connery Sr.
- William P. Connery Sr. (1855–1928), American politician, father of Lawrence J. Connery and William P. Connery, Jr.

== See also ==
- O.K. Connery, 1967 Italian Eurospy comedy film released in America as Operation Kid Brother
