= Steve Williams =

Steve Williams may refer to:

== Music ==
- Steve Williams (born 1953), drummer for the Welsh rock band Budgie
- Steve Williams (jazz drummer) (born 1956), Shirley Horn's accompanist and band leader
- Stezo or Steve Williams (born 1969), rapper
- Steve Williams (keyboardist) (born 1971), keyboardist for Power Quest

== Sports ==
=== Association football (soccer) ===
- Steve Williams (footballer, born 1958), English midfielder for Southampton and Arsenal
- Steve Williams (footballer, born 1974), Welsh goalkeeper with Drogheda United
- Steve Williams (footballer, born 1983), English goalkeeper for Wycombe Wanderers
- Steve Williams (footballer, born 1987), English defender for Macclesfield

=== Rugby ===
- Steve Williams (rugby union, born 1958), Australian national team captain
- Steve Williams (rugby union, born 1970), Wales international rugby union player
- Steve Williams (rugby union, born 1982), Australian-born German rugby union international

=== Gridiron football ===
- Steve Williams (defensive lineman, born 1951), gridiron football player
- Steve Williams (defensive lineman, born 1981), gridiron football player
- Steve Williams (cornerback) (born 1991), American football cornerback

=== Other sports ===
- Steve Williams (sprinter) (born 1953), American track and field sprinter
- "Dr. Death" Steve Williams (1960–2009), American professional wrestler
- Steve Williams (caddie) (born 1963), New Zealand golf caddy
- Steve Williams (cyclist) (born 1973), Australian cyclist
- Steve Williams (rower) (born 1976), British rower

== Other uses ==
- Steve Williams (politician) (born 1951), judge and former politician in Ohio
- Steve Williams (animator) (born 1962), Canadian animator and special effects artist
- Stephen T. Williams, mayor of Huntington, West Virginia
- Steve Williams (businessman), Canadian businessman
- Steve Williams (Brickleberry), character from Brickleberry
- Stone Cold Steve Austin (born 1964), former professional wrestler

== See also ==
- Stevie Williams (born 1979), professional skateboarder
- Stephen Williams (disambiguation), also Steven
