= Alcoa =

American materials company

Alcoa Corporation
- Type: Public
- Traded as: NYSE: AA; S&P 400 component
- ISIN: US0138721065
- Industry: Metals
- Founded: 1888; 138 years ago
- Founder: Charles Martin Hall
- Headquarters: Pittsburgh, Pennsylvania, U.S.
- Area served: Worldwide
- Key people: William F. Oplinger (president & CEO); Steven W. Williams (chairman)
- Products: Bauxite; Alumina; Aluminum
- Revenue: ▼US$10.55 billion (2023)
- Operating income: ▼US$−584 million (2023)
- Net income: ▼US$−651 million (2023)
- Total assets: ▼US$14.16 billion (2023)
- Total equity: ▼US$4.251 billion (2023)
- Number of employees: 13,600 (2023)
- Website: alcoa.com
- Footnotes; Financials as of December 31, 2023. References

Alcoa Corporation (an acronym for "Aluminum Company of America") is an American industrial corporation that produces aluminum. According to industry rankings, it is among the largest producers globally. The company operates in 10 countries and is involved in mining, refining, smelting, fabricating, and recycling aluminum products.

Alcoa was founded in 1888 by Charles Martin Hall with the financial backing of Alfred E. Hunt and Arthur Vining Davis. Prior to its establishment, aluminum was difficult to refine and, as a result, was more expensive than silver or gold. In 1886, Hall discovered the Hall–Héroult process, a refining technique that reduced aluminum production costs. Hall approached Hunt and Davis to form a company to bring his process to market; the three founded Alcoa as the Pittsburgh Reduction Company, which expanded. Hunt died in 1898 after fighting in the Spanish–American War. The company changed its name to the Aluminum Company of America in 1907. Alcoa increased production by 40% during World War I and supplied aluminum during World War II.

In the 2000s, Alcoa purchased numerous competitors, including Reynolds Group Holdings (makers of Reynolds Wrap). On November 1, 2016, Alcoa Inc. split into two entities: a new one called Alcoa Corporation, which is engaged in the mining and manufacture of raw aluminum, and the renaming of Alcoa Inc. to Arconic Inc., which processes aluminum and other metals.

== History ==
=== Hall's patent ===
In 1886, Charles Martin Hall, a graduate of Oberlin College, discovered the process of smelting aluminum, almost simultaneously with Paul Héroult in France. He realized that by passing an electric current through a bath of cryolite and aluminum oxide, the then semi-rare metal aluminum remained as a byproduct. This discovery, now called the Hall–Héroult process, reduced production costs.

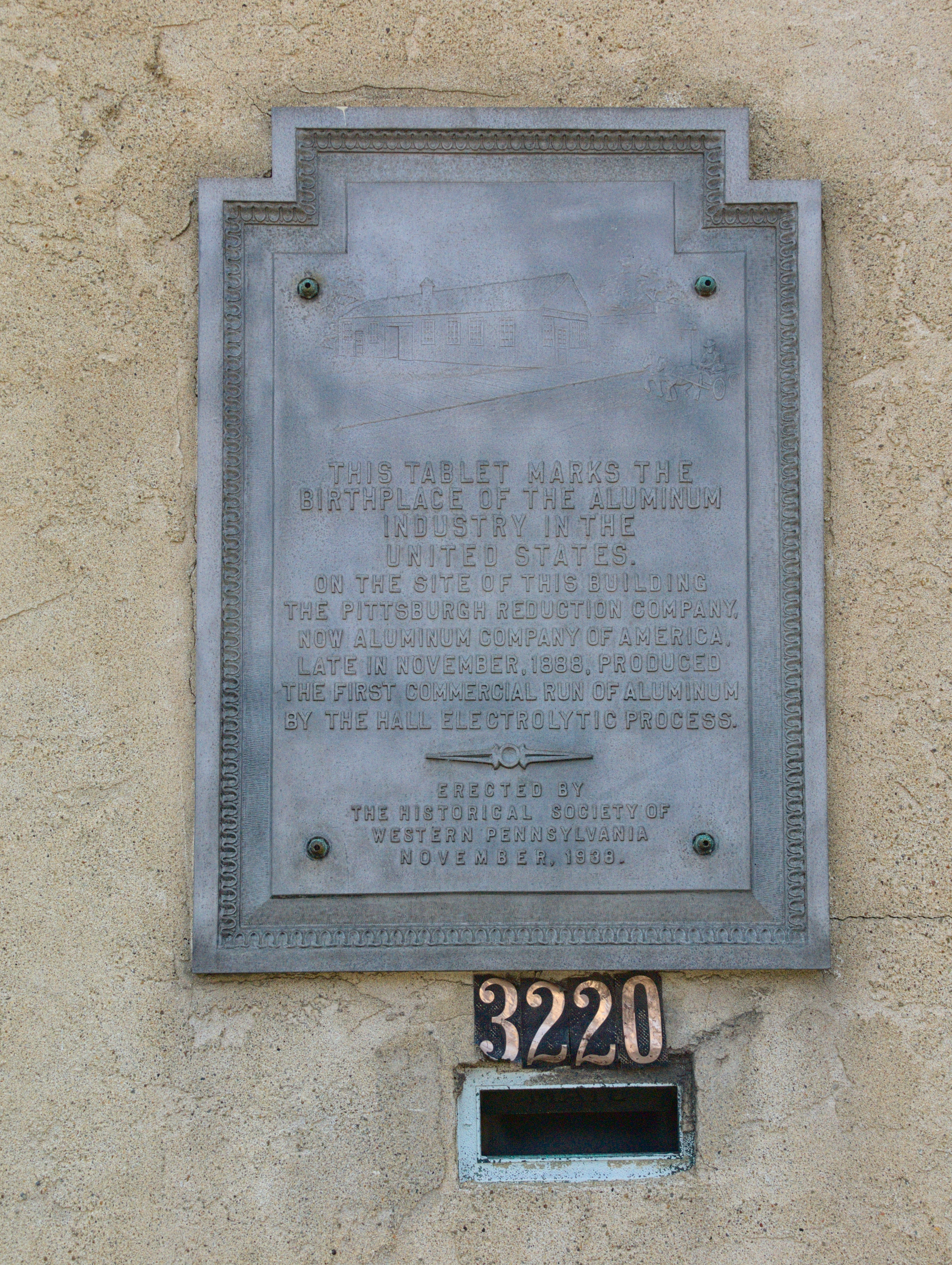
A tablet marking where, in November 1888, the Pittsburgh Reduction Company, now Aluminum Company of America, produced the first commercial run of aluminum by the Hall Electrolytic Process. Tablet installed by Historical Society of Western Pennsylvania in 1938.

Fewer than ten sites in the United States and Europe produced aluminum at the time. In 1887, Hall agreed to try his process at the Electric Smelting and Aluminum Company plant in Lockport, New York. Still, it was not used, and Hall left after one year, teaming up with Alfred E. Hunt to form a new company.

After graduating from Amherst College in 1888, Arthur Vining Davis joined the new venture because Arthur's father knew Alfred Hunt. At the time, aluminum sold at almost $5 per pound, making it too expensive to be used commercially. They worked to lower the cost of production using Charles Hall's ideas; Hall, Davis, and others worked 12-hour days together for months on the experiments. Their first commercial aluminum pour was on Thanksgiving Day in 1888.

=== Pittsburgh Reduction Company ===
The Pittsburgh Reduction Company began with an experimental smelting plant on Smallman Street in Pittsburgh, Pennsylvania with Hunt as president and Hall as vice president. In 1891, the company began production in New Kensington, Pennsylvania. Davis was named general manager and appointed to the board of directors in 1892. In 1895, a third site opened at Niagara Falls.

=== Hunt's departure ===
Hunt left the company in 1898 to fight in the Spanish–American War. While in Puerto Rico, he contracted malaria. Less than a year after his return to the states, he died from complications of the disease at age 44.

By about 1903, after a settlement with Hall's former employer, and while its patents were in force, the company was the only legal supplier of aluminum in the United States.

By 1902, New Kensington consisted of 173,000 sq. feet on 15 acres with 276 employees. The company operated hydropower and reduction plants in Niagara Falls, NY (1895), Shawinigan Falls, Quebec (Northern Aluminum Company), mining operations in Bauxite, AR (1901), and reduction facilities in East St. Louis, IL (1902). "The Aluminum Company of America" became the firm's new name on January 1, 1907. Davis was named company president in 1910 when the acronym "Alcoa" was coined. Hall remained a vice president until he died in 1914. It was given as a name to two of the locales where major corporate facilities were located (although one of these has since been changed), and in 1999, was adopted as the official corporate name.

From 1902 until 1915, additional plants in Massena, New York (1903), Alcoa, Tennessee (1911), Edgewater, New Jersey (1915), Badin, North Carolina (1915) came online while New Kensington had 31 buildings in the complex housing six departments (tubes, sheets, rods, bar and wire, extrusion, jobbing, foil) and two subsidiaries (Aluminum Cooking Utensil Company and Aluminum Seal Company). In 1907, it created the "company town" of Pine Grove, New York, for workers outside Massena.

=== The World Wars ===
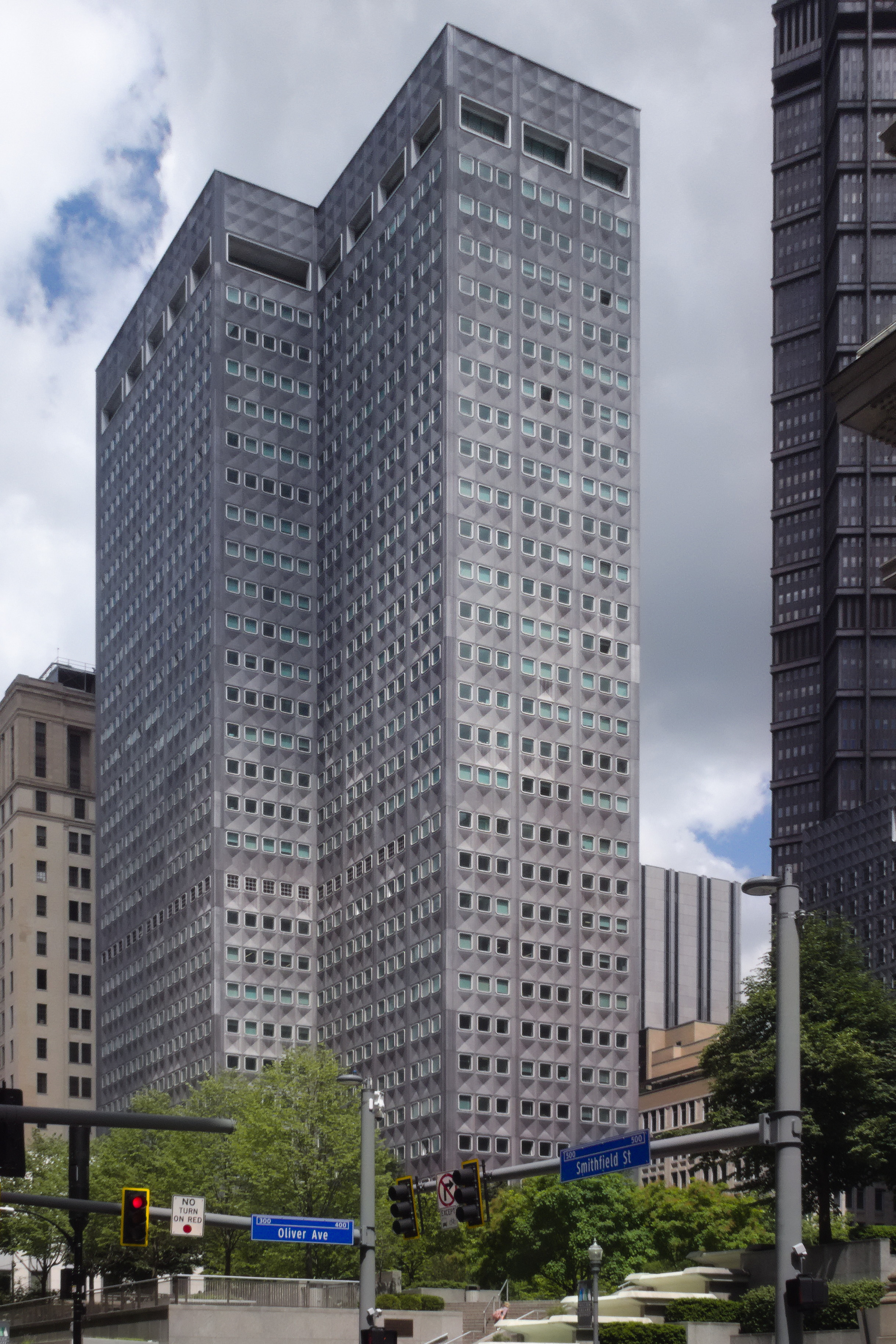
The Alcoa Building opened in 1953 and was designed by Harrison & Abramovitz. It remained the company's headquarters until 2001.

Historian George David Smith notes that "war was good to Alcoa." The FTC would bring an antitrust case after WWI. By the end of World War I Alcoa's New Kensington facility accounted for 3,292 workers—a fifth of the local population—and covered over 1 million square feet of manufacturing space on 75 acres. The war enabled Alcoa to increase production by 40% and to export some ninety million pounds to the Western Allies.

After WWI, Alcoa obtained the rights to Alfred Wilm's duralumin patent, which led to additional research into other aluminum alloys. By 1923, Alcoa's New Kensington, Pennsylvania plant was using horizontal extrusion presses, with preheated billets, for aerospace and construction applications. One of the first industrial uses was for the Navy's dirigible Shenandoah, followed ten years later with airplane applications. The Northern Aluminum Company in Quebec was renamed the Aluminum Company of Canada (ALCAN) in 1925. They were responsible for the development of Arvida, Quebec, a remote area 250 km north of Quebec City, including infrastructure to support the plant workforce.

Davis was named chairman of Alcoa's board of directors in 1928 and remained in that role for thirty years until his retirement.

In 1938, the Justice Department charged Alcoa with illegal monopolization and demanded that the company be dissolved. The case of United States v. Alcoa was settled six years later.

During both World Wars, about 90% of U.S. aluminum production went to military uses. A German U-Boat sank the SS Alcoa Puritan in 1942, as it carried a load of bauxite ore.

=== Alumax ===
In 1998, Alcoa acquired Alumax in a cash and share deal for $2.8 billion. Alcoa paid $50 a share in cash for half of the shares and 0.6975 Alcoa share for each of the remaining Alumax shares. Alcoa also assumed $1 billion in debt. Alumax's assets included the Eastalco aluminum smelter in Adamstown, Maryland, the Intalco aluminum smelter in Ferndale, Washington, the Deschambault Plant in Deschambault, Québec, Canada and the Kawneer brand of building construction products.

=== Reynolds ===
In 2000, Alcoa acquired Reynolds Metals Co. in an all-share deal for $4.5 billion. To clear anti-competition regulatory hurdles, Alcoa was required to sell Reynolds's 25% interest in a Washington smelter and all of Reynolds's alumina refineries. Reynolds owned a 56% interest in the Worsley alumina refinery in Australia, a 50% interest in a refinery in Germany, and a 100% interest in a Texas refinery. Alcoa also planned to sell Reynolds's construction and distribution business and the company's $400 million transportation business. Alcoa sold its packaging and consumer business, formerly called Reynolds Metals, to the Rank Group for $2.7 billion in 2008.

=== Cordant ===
In 2000, Alcoa also purchased Cordant Technologies Inc. for $57 a share in cash, or $2.3 billion, and assumed $685 million of Cordant's debt for a total transaction value of $2.9 billion. Cordant's divisions included Huck Fasteners, Jacobson Mfg. Co., Continental/Midland Group, its 85% interest in Howmet International Inc., and Thiokol Corporation. In 2001, Alcoa sold Thiokol for $2.9 billion to Alliant Techsystems (ATK).

=== Chalco ===
Alcoa purchased an 8% stake of Aluminum Corporation of China (Chalco) in 2001. It tried to form a strategic alliance with China's largest aluminum producer, at its Pingguo facility; however, it was unsuccessful. Alcoa sold their stake in Chalco on September 12, 2007, for around $2 billion.

=== Chemicals ===
In 2004, Alcoa's specialty chemicals business was sold to two private equity firms led by Rhône Group for an enterprise value of $342 million, which included the assumption of debt and other unfunded obligations. Rhône Group then changed the name to Almatis, Inc.

=== Corporate relocation ===
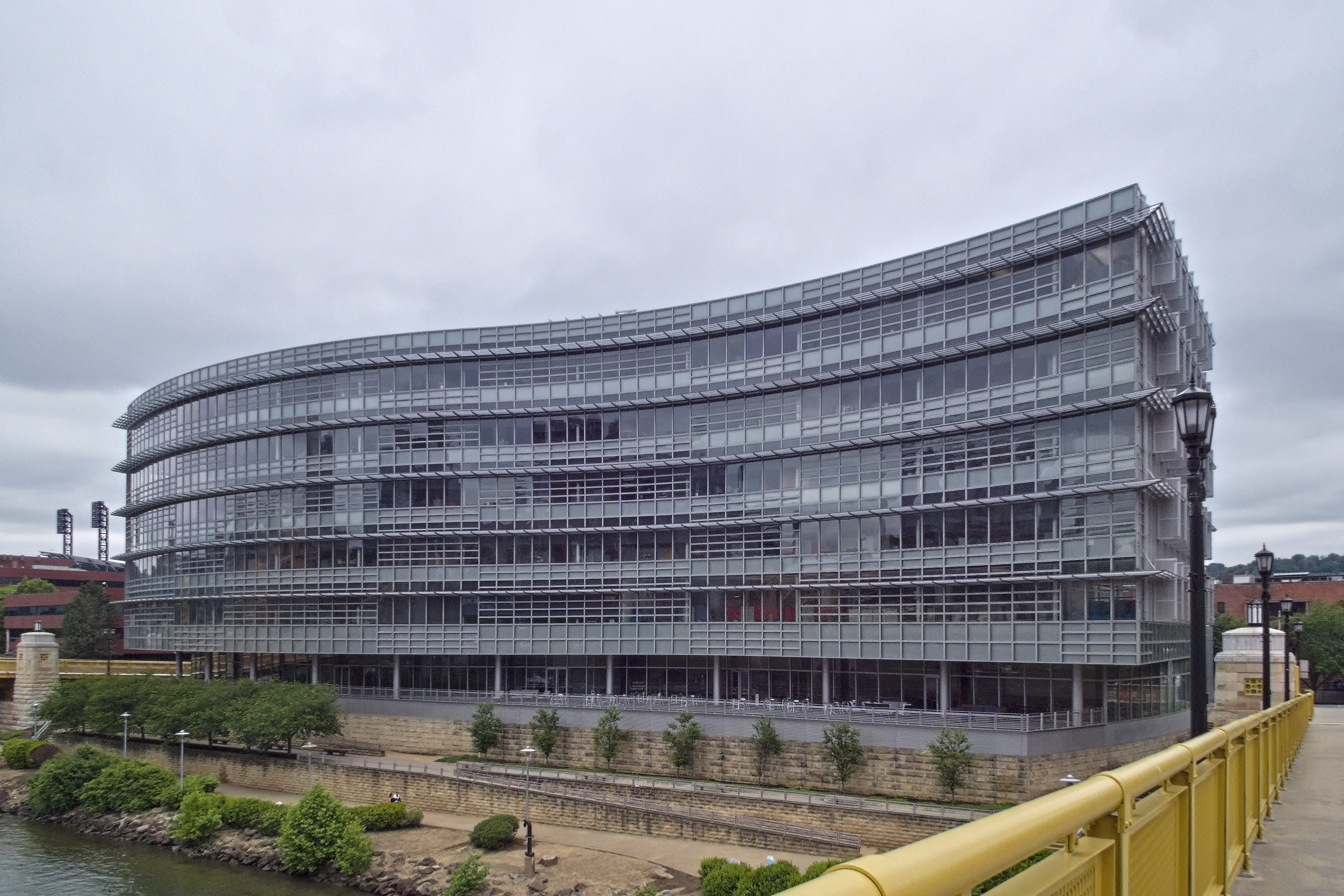
The Alcoa Corporate Center at 201 Isabella has been the company's headquarters since 2001.

In 2006, Alcoa relocated its top executives from Pittsburgh to New York City while its operational headquarters was still at its Corporate Center in Pittsburgh. Alcoa employed approximately 2,000 people at its Corporate Center in Pittsburgh and 60 at its New York office. Alcoa moved its headquarters back to Pittsburgh effective September 1, 2017, as part of a general consolidation of administrative facilities around the world. In October 2018, Alcoa announced plans to move from Pittsburgh's North Shore to a downtown Pittsburgh location.

=== Alcan bid ===
In May 2007, Alcoa Inc. made a US$27 billion hostile takeover bid for Alcan. The bid was withdrawn when Alcan announced a friendly takeover by Rio Tinto in July 2007.

On May 8, 2008, Klaus Kleinfeld was appointed CEO of Alcoa, succeeding Alain Belda. On April 23, 2010, Alcoa's board of directors selected Kleinfeld to the office of chairman, following Belda's planned retirement.

=== Recycling ===
On July 16, 2012, Alcoa announced that it would take over full ownership and operation of Evermore Recycling and make it part of Alcoa's Global Packaging group. Evermore Recycling recycles used beverage cans.

In June 2013, Alcoa announced it would permanently close its Fusina primary aluminum smelter in Venice, Italy, where production had been curtailed since June 2010.

On January 9, 2014, Alcoa settled with the U.S. Securities and Exchange Commission and the U.S. Department of Justice over charges of bribing Bahraini officials. Under the settlement terms, they will pay the SEC $175 million to settle the charges. To resolve the criminal claims with the DoJ, Alcoa World Alumina (AWA, a company within Alcoa World Alumina and Chemicals) is pleading guilty to one count of violating the anti-bribery provisions of the Foreign Corrupt Practices Act (FCPA). AWA will pay the DoJ $223 million in five equal installments over the next four years, bringing the company's total bill for the scandal to $384 million.

=== Company split ===
In June 2016, Alcoa Inc. announced plans to split itself into two companies: Alcoa Inc would be renamed as Arconic and would take over the business of designing and building processed metal parts, primarily for the automotive and aerospace industries; a new company, Alcoa Corporation, would be set up and spun out of the remainder of Alcoa Inc. and retain the Alcoa name. Alcoa Corp. would continue the mining, smelting, and refining of raw aluminum. The split was completed on November 1, 2016.

== Environmental record ==
In February 1999, Alcoa cleaned soils and sediment contaminated with polychlorinated biphenyls (PCB) and lead at the York Oil federal Superfund site in Moira, New York, in accordance with the Environmental Protection Agency. The site, a former waste oil recycling storage facility, accepted waste oil from several companies, including Alcoa. The facility was improperly managed and operated, and as a result, soils on the York Oil Property and nearby wetlands sediments and groundwater were contaminated. The United States Environmental Protection Agency (EPA) issued a Superfund Unilateral Order on December 31, 1998, requiring Alcoa to excavate, treat and dispose of the contaminated wetlands sediments.

In April 2003, Alcoa Inc. agreed to spend an estimated $330 million to install a new coal-fired power plant with pollution controls to eliminate the vast majority of sulfur dioxide and nitrogen dioxide emissions from the power plant at Alcoa's aluminum production facility in Rockdale, Texas. The settlement was the ninth case the Bush administration pursued to bring the coal-fired power plant industry into full compliance with the Clean Air Act. Alcoa was unlawfully operating at the Rockdale facility since it overhauled the Rockdale power plant without installing necessary pollution controls and without first obtaining proper permits required by "New Source Review" program of the Clean Air Act.

In 2008, the Political Economy Research Institute ranked Alcoa 15th among corporations emitting airborne pollutants in the United States. The ranking is based on the quantity (13 million pounds in 2005) and toxicity of the emissions. More recently Alcoa ranked first in the United States even though they had reduced their emissions to less than 5 million pounds in 2014. Alcoa's most recently published ranking has dropped to 72nd based on 2020 data.

In early 2026, Alcoa was fined a reported $55,000,000 AUD (roughly $39,000,000 USD) for illegally clearing land in Western Australia's northern jarrah forests. This illegal clearing occurred between 2019 and 2025, and put the company at odds with the federal government, who are yet to strike a deal on future operations in the region.

== Operations by country ==
=== Jamaica ===
Alcoa formed the Alcoa Minerals of Jamaica subsidiary on the island in 1959, shipping their first load of bauxite in 1963 from Rocky Point. Later in 1972, Alcoa established a 500,000 tonne per year refinery that processes bauxite into alumina. They have continued to upgrade the plant through the years, and it is now capable of 1,425,000 tonnes per year. In 1988, the Jamaican government gained a 50% share in the subsidiary and renamed the operation to Jamalco, Alcoa being the managing partner. Expansion of the operation in 2007 resulted in Alcoa owning 55% of the operation. Alcoa continues to mine bauxite in the Jamaican parishes of Clarendon and Manchester, while competitors' operations occur in nearby parishes.

=== Dominican Republic ===
In the 1970s, Alcoa negotiated with the Dominican Republic government concerning its bauxite mining operations. The U.S. Department of State expressed concerns that the Dominican Republic might follow Jamaica's lead in imposing higher taxes on Alcoa's operations.

=== Ghana ===
Alcoa's affiliate in Ghana, the Volta Aluminum Company, was completely closed between May 2003 and early 2006 due to problems with its electricity supply.

=== Guinea ===
Alcoa is an owner of the Compagnie des Bauxites de Guinée through Halco Mining, together with Rio Tinto Alcan and the Guinean government. Guinea produces bauxite and according to Winrock International has a third of the world's proven reserves.

=== Iceland ===
In 2005, Alcoa began construction in Iceland on Alcoa Fjarðaál, a new aluminum smelter, albeit under heavy criticism by local and international NGOs related to a controversial dam project exclusively dedicated to supplying electricity to this smelter. The Fjarðaál smelter in eastern Iceland was completed in June 2007 and brought into full operation the following April. The plant processes 940 tons of aluminum a day, with a capacity of 346,000 metric tons a year. For power, the plant relies on the Kárahnjúkar Hydropower Plant, constructed and operated by the state-owned Landsvirkjun specifically for the smelting operation. That project was subject to controversy due to its impact on the environment.

In 2006, Alcoa and the government of Iceland signed an agreement on instigating a thorough feasibility study for a new 250,000 tpy (Tons Per Year) smelter in Bakki by Húsavík in Northern Iceland. In October 2011, the proposed project was dropped because "the power availability and proposed pricing would not support an aluminum smelter".

Alcoa announced plans to close the office in Reykjavik.

=== Russia ===
In 2005 Alcoa acquired two production facilities in Russia, at Samara and Belaya Kalitva.

=== Wales ===
On November 21, 2006, Alcoa announced that it planned to close the Waunarlwydd works in Swansea, with the loss of 298 jobs. Production ceased at the Swansea plant on January 27, 2007. A small site closure team worked until December 31, 2008. Alcoa still owns the site, but it is now managed locally and renamed Westfield Industrial Park. Several of the large buildings are leased out to local businesses.

=== Australia ===
Alcoa operates bauxite mines, alumina refineries, and aluminum smelters through Alcoa World Alumina and Chemicals (AWAC), a joint venture between Alumina Limited and Alcoa. Alcoa operates two bauxite mines in Western Australia—the Huntly and Willowdale mines. Alcoa World Alumina and Chemicals owns and operates three alumina refineries in Western Australia: Kwinana, Pinjarra, and Wagerup. The Wagerup expansion plans were delayed due to the 2008 financial crisis. In January 2024, Alcoa announced it would cease alumina production at its Kwinana refinery that year. Two aluminum smelters are also operated in the state of Victoria at Portland and Point Henry; the Point Henry smelter was scheduled to be closed in August 2014. Alcoa Australia Rolled Products, a 100% Alcoa Inc. venture, operates two rolling mills. The Point Henry Rolling Mill in Victoria and the Yennora Rolling Mill in N.S.W. have a combined rolling capacity of approx. 200,000 tonnes. Alcoa uses 12,600 GWh, or 15% of Victoria's electricity annually.

Around 2009–10 there were claims that pollution from Alcoa's Western Australian Wagerup plant had harmed the health of members of the adjacent local community, which Alcoa said were unfounded.

In February 2024 Alcoa announced that it would acquire Alumina for $2.2 billion in an all-stock deal. As part of the deal Alcoa would gain full ownership of AWAC. The acquisition was completed in August 2024.

On October 21, 2025, the Australian and U.S. governments signed a deal on rare-earth and critical minerals, by which the U.S. would provide investment for development of a processing plant for gallium at one of the Alcoa refineries in Wagerup, in association with the Japanese corporation Sojitz. Gallium is an essential component in the manufacture of microchips. Once the project is up and running, the plant would provide up to 10 per cent of total global gallium supply, and will be a major player in the Australian rare-earths industry.

=== United States ===
On January 3, 2003, Alcoa opened its new operations headquarters on the North Shore of Pittsburgh. This move came about after it donated its 50-year-old skyscraper headquarters in Downtown Pittsburgh to the Regional Development Authority.

Alcoa created a plant just outside Maryville in Blount County, Tennessee. To support the factory, Alcoa built a small city and named it Alcoa. The Alcoa Tenn Federal Credit Union was the first employee-created credit union in the state. The plant is no longer an Alcoa business.

Alcoa's Massena West plant has continuously operated since 1902. The Reynolds Aluminum Plant became Massena East when the companies merged in 2000.

Alcoa had a smelting plant in Badin, North Carolina from 1917 to 2007 and continued a hydroelectric power operation there until February 1, 2017, when the Yadkin Hydroelectric Project was sold to Cube Hydro.

Alcoa also operates an aluminum smelting plant of similar size to the one in Tennessee in Warrick County, Indiana, just east of Newburgh. Vectren Energy operates a coal power plant on the site to provide electricity. In 2021, Alcoa retained the aluminum smelter and generating station while selling the rest of the facility to Kaiser Aluminum. This sale included the cast house, ingot facilities, hot mill, cold mills, and finishing mills.

Alcoa maintains several Research and Development Centers in the United States. The largest one, Alcoa Technical Center, is located East of its Pittsburgh Headquarters at Alcoa Center, Pennsylvania.

Alcoa formerly owned a processing plant in Lancaster, Pennsylvania. It is currently owned by Arconic.

Alcoa plans to close offices in Richmond, Virginia; Nashville, Tennessee; and Chicago, Illinois.

=== Alcoa Steamship Company ===
House flag used by Alcoa Steamship Company

Old house flag used by Alcoa Steamship Company (1963–1990s)

Old house flag used by Alcoa Steamship Company (1917–1963)

The Alcoa Steamship Company was a subsidiary of ALCOA since the company was formed in 1917.

- List of ships:
  - SS Alcoa Banner (SS Sundance)
  - SS Alcoa Cavalier
  - SS Alcoa Clipper
  - SS Alcoa Corsair
  - SS Alcoa Guide
  - SS Alcoa Partner
  - SS Alcoa Patriot
  - SS Alcoa Pegasus
  - SS Alcoa Pennant
  - SS Alcoa Pilgrim
  - SS Alcoa Pioneer
  - SS Alcoa Planter
  - SS Alcoa Pointer
  - SS Alcoa Polaris
  - SS Alcoa Puritan
  - SS Alcoa Ranger
  - SS Alcoa Roamer
  - SS Alcoa Runner
  - SS Bushranger

== Lobbying ==
After the Russian invasion of Ukraine in 2022, Alcoa spent over $1 million to lobby the U.S. government for sanctions against Russian aluminum companies.

== In popular culture ==
From 1955 to 1957, Alcoa sponsored The Alcoa Hour, an anthology television series on NBC. The series ran for 48 episodes across two seasons and would feature an advertisement for Alcoa products before the credits of each program. The series featured some of the early work of director Sidney Lumet, the five-time Oscar nominee known for the 1957 version of 12 Angry Men.

Between 1957 and 1960, the Alcoa-sponsored Alcoa Theatre, an NBC anthology television series that went on to win three Emmys. From 1961 to 1963, Alcoa sponsored a third anthology television series on ABC. Alcoa Premiere was hosted by Fred Astaire and received 14 Emmy nominations during its two-year run.

Alcoa is portrayed as the main sponsor of the 1953 CBS program See It Now in George Clooney's Academy Award–nominated 2005 film Good Night, and Good Luck.

== Leadership ==
=== President ===
1. Alfred Ephraim Hunt, 1888–1899
2. Richard Beatty Mellon, 1899–1910
3. Arthur Vining Davis, 1910–1928
4. Roy Arthur Hunt, 1928–1951
5. Irving White Wilson, 1951–1957
6. Frank Lewis Magee, 1957–1960
7. Lawrence Litchfield Jr., 1960–1963
8. John Dixon Harper, 1963–1970
9. William Henry Krome George, 1970–1975
10. William Beach Renner, 1975–1981
11. Charles William Parry, 1981–1983
12. Charles Frederick Fetterolf, 1983–1991
13. Alain Juan Pablo Belda, 1997–2000
14. Klaus-Christian Kleinfeld, 2007–2010
15. Roy Christopher Harvey, 2017–2023
16. William Francis Oplinger, 2023–present

=== Chairman of the Board ===
1. Arthur Vining Davis, 1928–1957
2. Irving White Wilson, 1957–1960
3. Frank Lewis Magee, 1960–1963
4. Lawrence Litchfield Jr., 1963–1966
5. Frederick Jacob Close, 1966–1970
6. John Dixon Harper, 1970–1975
7. William Henry Krome George, 1975–1983
8. Charles William Parry, 1983–1987
9. Paul Henry O'Neill, 1987–2000
10. Alain Juan Pablo Belda, 2001–2010
11. Klaus-Christian Kleinfeld, 2010–2016
12. Michael G. Morris, 2016–2021
13. Steven Walter Williams, 2021–2025
14. Thomas Joseph Gorman, 2025–present

== See also ==
- Alumina
- Aluminum can
- List of alumina refineries
- Alcoa World Alumina and Chemicals
- Alcoa, Tennessee
- Alcoa Power Generating Inc.
- Cutco, a company that sells knives, founded in 1949 by Alcoa and Case Cutlery
- List of aluminum smelters
- 1953 Alcoa Aluminum advertisement
- History of aluminum
