= Comair =

Comair may refer to:

- Comair (South Africa), defunct South Africa based airline
- Comair Flight Services, South African business charter airline
- Comair (United States), defunct Cincinnati area-based airline owned by Delta Air Lines

== See also ==
- Conair (disambiguation)
