= You mean a woman can open it? =

1953 Twist-off bottle cap advertisement tagline

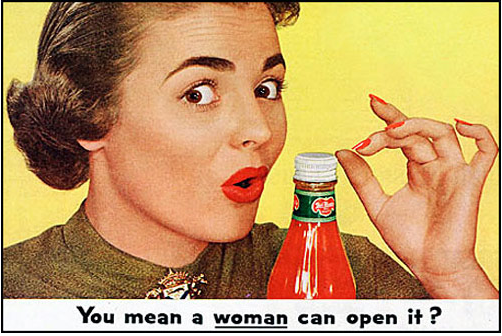
The image used in the advertisement

In 1953 Alcoa Aluminum produced an advertisement promoting their HyTop twist-off bottle cap. The advertisement, often erroneously attributed to Del Monte Foods, featured a picture of a woman with the tagline "You mean a woman can open it?" The advertisement has been subject to criticism in later reviews and is viewed as a symbol of casual sexism that was prevalent in the United States during the 1950s.

== Description ==
The advertisement features a woman wearing red lipstick and looking at the reader while holding a Del Monte ketchup bottle with the appearance of being about to open it. The tagline directly below it is, "You mean a woman can open it?" with the word woman underlined. The first sentence of the article it accompanied stated, "Easily—without a knife blade, a bottle opener, or even a husband!"

== Critical review ==
The advertisement has been described as an example of targeted advertising towards women, is viewed as a symbol of social stereotypes during the 1950s and is frequently cited as emblematic of the Mad Men era. Scholarly interpretation states that it implies that a woman is dependent upon her husband to do things for her. In one such commentary, the New York Daily News stated that the woman in the advertisement is "clearly stunned and possibly delighted" at being able to open the bottle easily. In addition, the advertisement has been used as a symbol of retro advertising, with a book bearing the same title as the tagline being published in 2000 by Adams Media detailing retro advertisements. The Independent claimed that it enforced the stereotype of a woman as an unintelligent housewife.
