= James E. Rich =

American politician (1869–1961)

- Rich at his desk as mayor of Lynn, MA

33rd Mayor of Lynn, Massachusetts
- In office 1909–1910
- Preceded by: Thomas F. Porter
- Succeeded by: William P. Connery, Sr.

Personal details
- Born: December 22, 1869
- Died: October 20, 1961 (aged 91)
- Party: Democrat
- Occupation: Foreman of a car barn of the Boston and Northern Street Railway.

James Ellis Rich (December 22, 1869 – October 20, 1961) was a Massachusetts politician who served as the 33rd mayor of Lynn, Massachusetts from 1909 to 1910.

Before he was elected mayor, Rich was a motorman and later foreman of a car barn of the Boston and Northern Street Railway.

== Notes ==
Political offices
Preceded by Thomas F. Porter	Mayor of Lynn, Massachusetts; 1909 to 1910	Succeeded by William P. Connery, Sr.
