= Karlheinz Kaske =

German businessman

Karlheinz Kaske (April 19, 1928 in Essen – September 27, 1998) was a German manager and CEO of the Siemens AG from 1981 to 1992.

Kaske studied Physics at RWTH Aachen and joined Siemens in 1950, when he became an engineer in the Siemens factory at Karlsruhe. Later he was a lecturer for electrical engineering at RWTH Aachen and he continued academic teaching during his following years in Siemens’ development department. In 1975, Kaske became a member of the board of directors and since 1977 he was director of the power engineering department. He succeeded Bernhard Plettner as CEO in 1981. He passed the office to Heinrich von Pierer in October 1992.

Preceded by Bernhard Plettner	CEO of Siemens AG; 1981–1992	Succeeded by Heinrich von Pierer
