= Alfred E. Hunt =

American metallurgist and businessman (1855–1899)

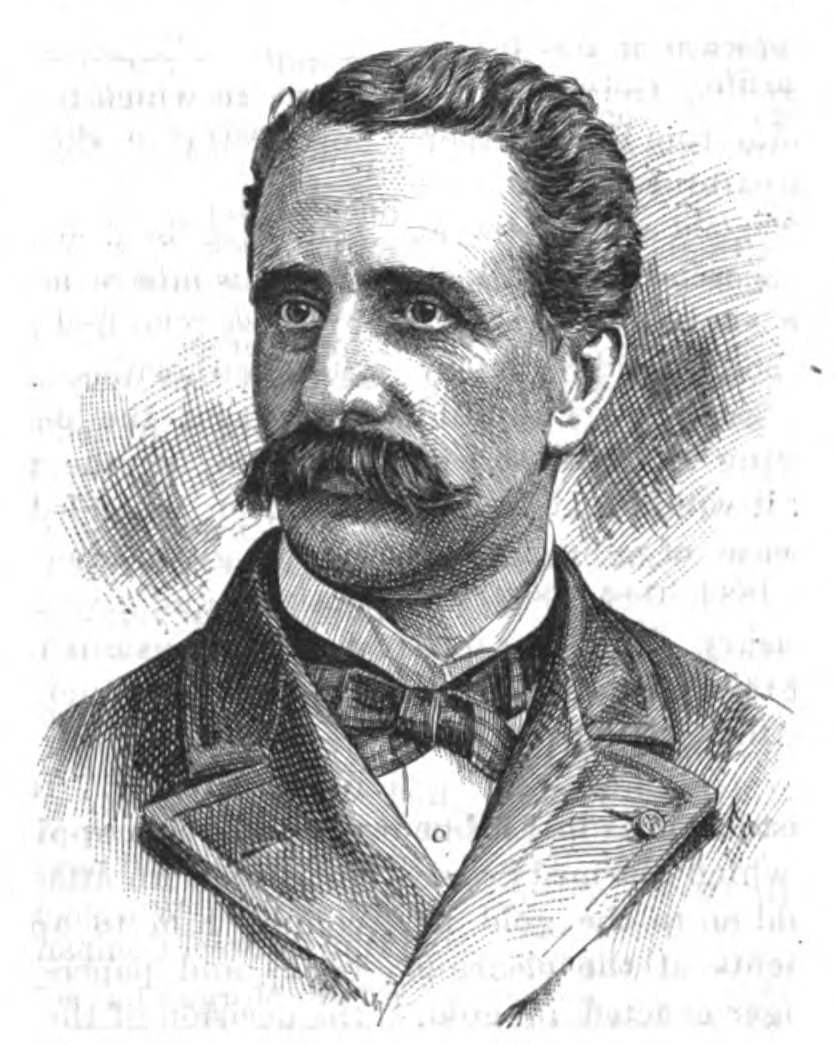
- Born: March 31, 1855; East Douglas, Massachusetts, U.S.
- Died: April 26, 1899 (aged 44); Philadelphia, Pennsylvania, U.S.
- Resting place: Allegheny Cemetery
- Education: Massachusetts Institute of Technology (1876)
- Occupations: Matallurgist; industrialist
- Known for: Aluminum Company of America
- Spouse: Maria T. McQuesten
- Mother: Mary Hunt

Alfred Ephraim Hunt (1855-1899) was a 19th-century American metallurgist and industrialist best known for founding the company that would eventually become Alcoa, the world's largest producer and distributor of aluminum.

== Early life ==
Hunt was a New Englander by birth. His parents were Mary Hanchett Hunt (1830–1906) and Leander B. Hunt (1812–1886). He graduated from the Massachusetts Institute of Technology in 1876 with a degree in metallurgy and mining. His first several jobs kept him in New England, first in Boston with the Bay State Ironworks, which was operating the first open hearth steel furnace in the United States. From there, he went on to Nashua, New Hampshire, to work for the Nashua Iron & Steel Company.

His career eventually took him to Pittsburgh, doing metallurgical work for the Pittsburgh Testing Laboratory, which he would acquire in partnership with the young chemist George Hubbard Clapp in 1887. He was working there in 1888 when his acquaintance Romaine C. Cole brought a young man three years out of Oberlin College to meet him.

== Founding Alcoa ==
When Alfred E. Hunt became aware of Charles Martin Hall and his patent awarded two years earlier on a process for separating aluminum from common aluminum oxide through electrolysis, he became very interested. Though aluminum is the most common metallic element in the Earth's crust at about 8%, it is very rare in its free form. At the time of this meeting in 1888, the price of aluminum was $4.86 per pound. This made it strictly a "laboratory metal" with minimal commercial and industrial use.

The process for aluminum separation discovered by Hall, called the Hall-Héroult process because of its near-simultaneous discovery by Paul Héroult, provided a cheap and easy way to extract aluminum as a pure metal. Hunt realized that if he could create a market for this metal and control the patent on the process for extracting it from common materials that he'd have a substantial business on his hands.

Together with Charles Hall and a group of five other individuals including his partner at the Pittsburgh Testing Laboratory, George Hubbard Clapp, his chief chemist, W. S. Sample, Howard Lash, head of the Carbon Steel Company, Millard Hunsiker, sales manager for the Carbon Steel Company, and Robert Scott, a mill superintendent for the Carnegie Steel Company, Hunt raised $20,000 to launch the Pittsburgh Reduction Company which was later renamed Aluminum Company of America and shortened to Alcoa.

The Pittsburgh Reduction Company was able to produce aluminum in unprecedented quantities. The price of aluminum dropped quickly from $4.86 per pound to $0.70 per pound. Hunt would serve as the fledgling company's first president from 1888 to 1899 and identify early markets for the metal ranging from materials for electric cables to cookware. Alcoa would become and remain the world's largest producer of aluminum.

Carnegie Mellon University's Hunt Library was donated by Alfred's son Roy. The library features aluminum as its primary building material.

== Later years ==
With the outbreak of the Spanish–American War, Hunt helped to organize Battery B, a light artillery battery of the Pennsylvania National Guard, and was elected its first captain. He fought in the Puerto Rican theater of operation. He returned from the war in 1898 and died April 26, 1899, in Philadelphia, from complications from the malaria he had contracted during the war.

== Publications ==
Hunt, Alfred E. (1892). Aluminum: Its manufacture and uses from an engineering standpoint. Franklin Institute. p. 31. ASIN B0008CKF1O.
