= Conair =

Conair or Con Air may refer to:

- Conair Corporation, an American consumer goods company
- Conair Group, formerly known as Conair Aviation, a Canadian aerial firefighting company
- Conair of Scandinavia, a Danish airline 1964–1994
- Justice Prisoner Air Transportation System, nicknamed "Con Air", a United States Marshals Service airline
- Con Air, a 1997 American action film involving a Justice Prisoner Air Transportation System aircraft

== See also ==
- Conaire (disambiguation)
- Connellan Airways, later known as Connair
- Continental Airlines, an American airline
- Convair, an American aircraft manufacturer
- "Convenience Airways", a 2024 episode of The Simpsons inspired by the film Con Air
- Kawneer, an American construction products manufacturer
