= Klaus Kleinfeld =

German businessman (born 1957)

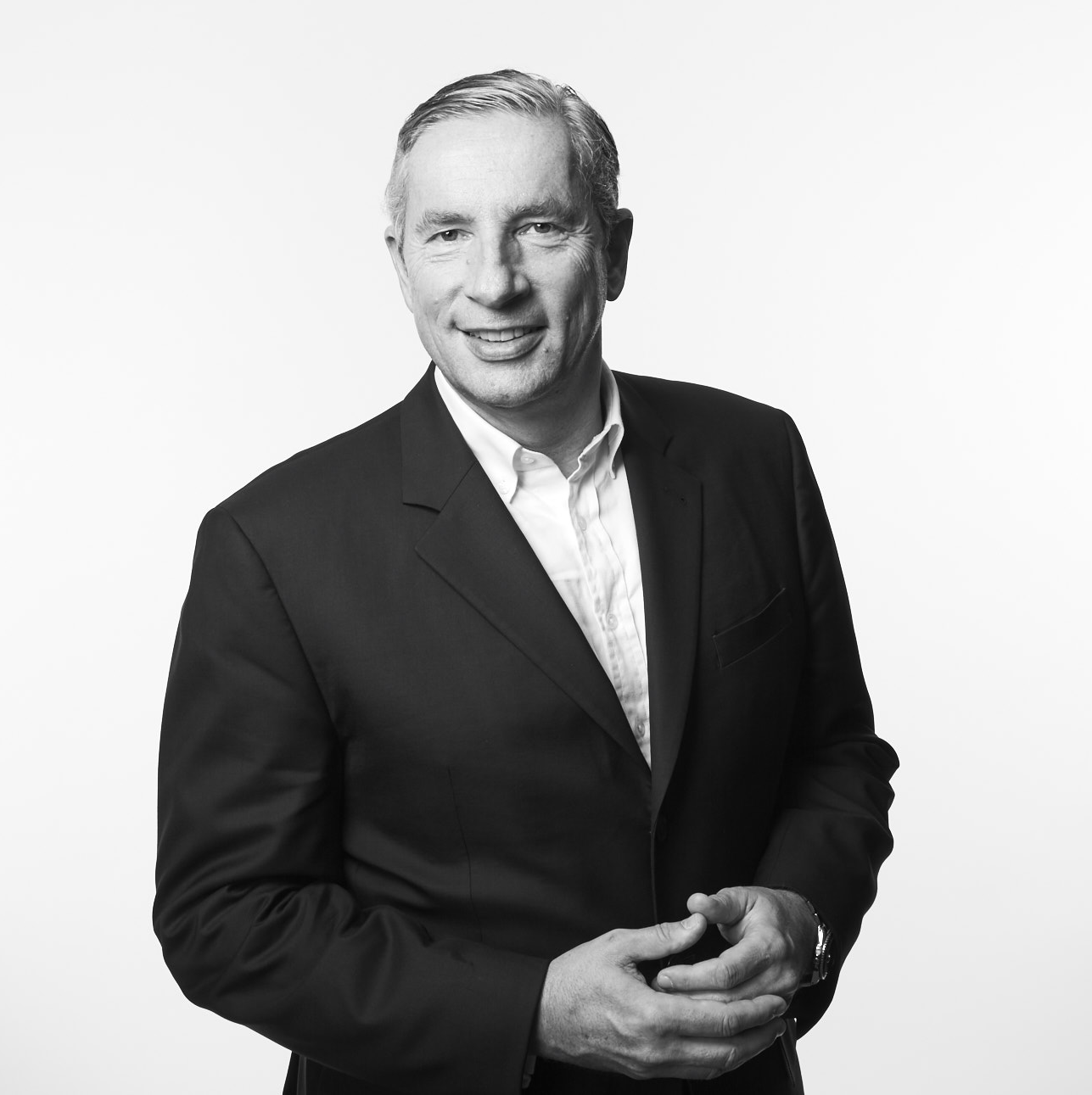
- Kleinfeld in 2016
- Born: Klaus-Christian Kleinfeld; 6 November 1957 (age 69); Bremen, West Germany
- Citizenship: American
- Education: Diplom, Business Administration, University of Göttingen, Göttingen, Germany; Ph.D., Strategic Management; University of Würzburg; Würzburg, Germany
- Occupations: CEO of Siemens, 2005-2007; CEO and chairman of Arconic, 2007-2017; Director of Neom project, 2017-2018

Klaus-Christian Kleinfeld (born 6 November 1957 in Bremen, West Germany) is a German businessman. He worked as the CEO of businesses including Siemens AG, Alcoa Inc, and Arconic.

Kleinfeld joined a marketing consulting firm in 1982, then worked briefly at Ciba-Geigy before joining Siemens AG in 1987 where he rose to become CEO in 2005. Kleinfeld's efforts to modernize the company led to conflict with defenders of Siemens' traditional business culture. However, the company's financial performance flourished. In 2006, a German government investigation uncovered slush funds in secret bank accounts maintained by Siemens in order to win contracts. Investigators found no evidence of wrongdoing by Kleinfeld and no charges were brought against him. In 2009, Kleinfeld, along with other former top Siemens executives, agreed to pay Siemens a sum to settle a related civil matter. In June 2007, Kleinfeld left Siemens, citing uncertainty about his future with the company after divisions among Siemens board members concerning the extension of his contract became public.

In August 2007, Kleinfeld was appointed COO of New York, NY-based Alcoa Inc, and, in May 2008, became Alcoa's CEO. He later also was chairman and CEO of the Alcoa spin-off Arconic. After unauthorised communications with an Arconic investor, he stepped down as chairman and CEO of Arconic in April 2017. In October 2017, he was named director of Saudi Arabia's Neom initiative, later becoming an advisor of Crown Prince Muhammad bin Salman.

== Early life and education ==
Klaus-Christian Kleinfeld was born on 6 November 1957 in Bremen, Germany. He earned a business degree from Georg August University in Göttingen, Germany and a Ph.D. in management from the University of Würzburg in Würzburg, Germany.

== Career ==
In 1982, Kleinfeld began his career as a marketing consultant. In 1986, he joined Ciba-Geigy, a multinational pharmaceutical company based in Basel, Switzerland, where he was a product manager in the company's pharmaceutical division.

=== Siemens AG ===
In 1987, Kleinfeld joined Munich-based Siemens AG, a global engineering and technology services firm based in the U.S. and Germany. His first position was in the company's corporate sales and marketing unit, where he worked as a marketing research manager. In 1990, he founded and led Siemens Management Consulting, an internal global partner for Siemens' businesses with a major role in the restructuring of many Siemens' business units around the world.

In January 2001, Kleinfeld was promoted to chief operating officer (COO) of Siemens USA. The recession in the U.S. had adversely impacted profits and Kleinfeld conceived a radical strategy to improve the performance of Siemens' operating companies. He also sought to fix, sell or close operations of recently acquired companies and create new cross-selling opportunities. Unprofitable operations were reduced from 24 to 8, and other cost-cutting measures saved an estimated $100 million. From January 2005 to June 2007, Kleinfeld was CEO of Siemens USA. In January 2004, Kleinfeld was appointed to Siemens' corporate executive committee. Also in 2004, Kleinfeld was appointed vice president of Siemens AG.

In 2004, Kleinfeld advocated for a customer- and shareholder-focused corporate culture, pressuring German unions to loosen labor rules and extend the German work week from 35 to 40 hours, with no additional pay. Kleinfeld said that German workers "have to adjust and understand what the world is like" to remain competitive. Two years later, sales had increased 16 percent, profits rose 35 percent, and shares rose 40 percent. In January 2005 he was named CEO, succeeding Heinrich von Pierer.

Kleinfeld's plan to modernize the company led to conflict with defenders of Siemens' traditional business culture. Because of the traditional two-tier German governance structure, a supervisory board that included union and shareholder representatives balked at Kleinfeld's restructuring plans. While his strategies were generally viewed positively by the worldwide financial press, Kleinfeld was criticized by German media, mainly for a perceived lack of social responsibility pertaining to Siemens workers.

Prior to his role as CEO, Kleinfeld led Siemens Management Consulting as a partner for the global businesses, contributing significantly to the profitable turnaround of Siemens' regional business in the U.S. By April 2007, all Siemens Groups had reached or exceeded target margins for the first time.

==== Bribery investigation ====
In November 2006, a fraud investigation by the German government became public. The investigation later found that Siemens maintained slush funds in secret bank accounts outside Germany that the company used to win contracts. Once the investigation became public, Kleinfeld hired outside legal and auditing experts to conduct an independent investigation and revamp the company's internal accounting and control practices and eliminate potential improper practices. The independent investigation later found that the company paid hundreds of millions of dollars in bribes, which were legal in Germany until 1999, but that there were "no indications of personal misconduct or that Kleinfeld had any knowledge of events" related to the scandal. Corruption charges were brought against Siemens by the SEC. Kleinfeld and other former Siemens executives and board members were accused of "failing to prevent corruption". No charges were brought against Kleinfeld and the Department of Justice cited Siemens' cooperation and the independent investigation initiated by Kleinfeld as factors for reducing Siemens' monetary penalty.

In June 2007, Kleinfeld left Siemens, citing uncertainty about his future with the company after divisions among Siemens board members concerning the extension of his contract became public. In September 2009, Siemens threatened to sue Kleinfeld and other former executives for supervisory failings and extended a settlement offer to compensate the company for millions of dollars in fines and damage to its "reputation." Kleinfeld agreed to settle the matter for 2 million euros.

=== Alcoa and Arconic ===
In 2003, Kleinfeld joined Alcoa's board of directors, receiving $2.3 million in shares on his first day. In August 2007, Alcoa appointed Kleinfeld president. In May 2008, he was named CEO, succeeding Alain J. P. Belda. In April 2010, Kleinfeld was named chairman of Alcoa.

In 2012, Kleinfeld began closing a number of costly, outdated smelting facilities. In 2013, he cited a backlog in aerospace manufacturing and an increasing demand for lightweight aluminum products in the automotive and construction industries due to a "historic shift" toward fuel and energy efficiency. Kleinfeld led diversification of the company with the additions of lightweight multi-materials technology, engineering and manufacturing, and directed the acquisition of three companies to position Alcoa to the aerospace business. He implemented a strategy to reduce the company's reliance on commodities, overseeing its rise to become a global leader in lightweight metals, and increasing its reputation for manufacturing innovation.

On 28 September 2015, Alcoa completed its transformation with an announcement that it would split into two publicly traded companies the following year – a spin-off called Alcoa Corp., and another comprising the renamed Alcoa Inc., Arconic, which would hold onto Alcoa Inc.'s value-add mid- and downstream businesses. On 1 November 2016, Alcoa fully separated its raw aluminum operation from business units that supply the aerospace and automotive markets. The spin-off retained is a newly created company Alcoa Corp. Kleinfeld remained as Arconic's chairman and CEO following the split. He initially proposed to be chairman of the upstream company during the transition phase, but the proposal was declined; Kleinfeld was not affiliated with the new company.

==== STEM education initiatives ====
Under Kleinfeld's direction, Alcoa has supported STEM (science, technology, engineering and math) workforce development initiatives to train and educate students and teachers globally. A July 2012 op-ed piece co-authored by Kleinfeld and Richard Haass, president of the Council on Foreign Relations, proposed closer business and government collaboration to narrow the STEM skills gap between the labor market and manufacturers. In September 2013, President Obama appointed Kleinfeld to the President's Advanced Manufacturing Partnership Steering Committee 2.0 for Alcoa's continuing efforts to maintain U.S. leadership in emerging technologies.

==== Resignation from Arconic ====
On 31 January 2017, the hedge fund Elliott Management Corporation launched a proxy contest against the company. Elliott publicly called for the firing of Kleinfeld, citing the company's lackluster stock performance, missed profit forecasts, and inefficient spending. On 17 April 2017, Kleinfeld resigned as chairman and CEO by mutual agreement with the board of Arconic, after sending an unauthorized letter to Elliott (he sent a letter to Elliott founder Paul Singer making threatening insinuations about an incident involving "a Native American feather headdress and a rendition of 'Singin’ in the Rain' performed in a fountain" during a trip to the 2006 World Cup).

=== Neom ===
In October 2017, Kleinfeld was named director of Saudi Arabia's Neom initiative. It was announced in July 2018 that Kleinfeld would be promoted from director of Neom to advisor of Crown Prince Muhammad bin Salman on 1 August 2018, and that Nadhmi Al-Nasr would succeed him as director of Neom.

=== Constellation ===
With partners, Kleinfeld founded the SPAC "Constellation" which was listed on the NYSE in 2021. He founded his own investment company "K2 Elevation" which invests in and develops international enterprises in the technology and biotech segment. Currently its portfolio consists of activities in Germany, Austria, and the US. He advises a number of corporations as well as different organizations.

=== Boards ===
Kleinfeld is a member of the Bilderberg Group Steering Committee, the Brookings Institution Board of Trustees, the Foundation Board of the World Economic Forum, the Board of the World Economic Forum USA, and the Metropolitan Opera Advisory Board. In 2009, Kleinfeld was named chairman of the board of the U.S.-Russia Business Council (USRBC), which promotes trade and investment between the U.S. and Russia. In 2013, Kleinfeld joined the U.S.-China Business Council Board of Directors and is a member of the Chinese Premier's Global CEO Advisory Council. Previously, Kleinfeld wason the supervisory board of Bayer AG from 2005 to 2014, was a director of Citigroup Inc. from 2005 to 2007, and was a member of the Managing Board of Siemens AG from 2004 to 2007. Kleinfeld also was on the Board of Directors of Morgan Stanley and Hewlett Packard Enterprise until April 2017. He is a member of the supervisory boards of NEOM, Konux and Ferolabs. Kleinfeld is Honorary Senator of the Lindau Nobel Laureates Meeting and a member of the board of the Metropolitan Opera, New York.

== Awards and recognition ==
In December 2014, Kleinfeld received a Legend in Leadership Award from the Yale Chief Executive Leadership Institute. Also in December 2014, Kleinfeld received a Dwight D. Eisenhower Global Leadership Award from the Business Council for International Understanding. In May 2014, Kleinfeld was named CEO of the Year at the 2014 Platts Global Metals Awards.

== Personal life ==
Kleinfeld resides in New York with his wife, Birgit, and two children. Kleinfeld's hobby is sport (marathon, skiing, tennis).

== Publications ==
- Shaping the Future. The Siemens Entrepreneurs 1847–2018. Ed. Siemens Historical Institute, Hamburg 2018, ISBN 9-783867-746243.
- Corporate Identity und strategische Unternehmensführung, Akademie-Verlag München 1994, ISBN 3-929115-16-6

Preceded by Heinrich von Pierer	CEO of Siemens AG; 2005 – 2007	Succeeded by Peter Löscher
Preceded by Alain Belda	CEO of Alcoa Inc. 2008 – 2016	Succeeded by Company renamed
Preceded by New company	CEO of Arconic; 2016 – 2017	Succeeded by David Hess
