= Heinrich von Pierer =

German manager (born 1941)

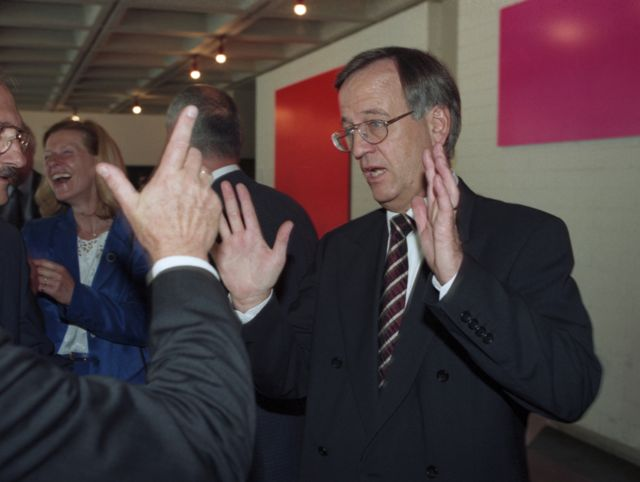
- Born: Heinrich Karl Friedrich Eduard Pierer von Esch; 26 January 1941 (age 85); Erlangen, Germany
- Occupation: Businessman
- Known for: CEO of Siemens AG

Heinrich von Pierer (exactly Heinrich Karl Friedrich Eduard Pierer von Esch; born 26 January 1941 in Erlangen) is a German manager. From 1992 to 2005, he was CEO of Siemens AG. Subsequently, he was chairman of the supervisory board from which he resigned on 25 April 2007.

== History ==
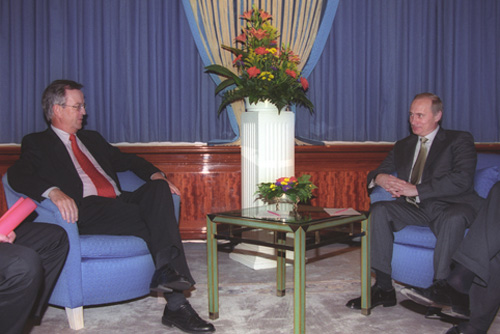
von Pierer with Vladimir Putin on 15 June 2000 in Berlin.

Pierer studied law and economics at University of Erlangen–Nuremberg, graduated with a Juris Doctor, JD (Law) in 1968 and joined Siemens in 1969. From 1977, he worked for the company's power generation subsidiary Kraftwerk Union AG (KWU). In 1989, he became President of KWU and a member of the Managing Board of Siemens AG. In 1992, Pierer succeeded Karlheinz Kaske as CEO and held this post until January 2005, when Klaus Kleinfeld took over.

He is member of several other supervisory boards (e.g., Bayer and Volkswagen). Pierer is President of the German industry's Asia–Pacific–Committee which he helped to found in 1993. He also functioned as an advisor to the German governments under Gerhard Schröder and Angela Merkel.

In April 2004, Pierer became one of the few business leaders to speak at a Security Council meeting, where he reported on his recent meeting with Hamid Karzai and on the infrastructure work Siemens was doing in Afghanistan and Iraq.

He received the Eduard Rhein Ring of Honor from the German Eduard Rhein Foundation in 2000.

Preceded by Karlheinz Kaske	CEO of Siemens AG; 1992 – 2005	Succeeded by Klaus Kleinfeld
