= William P. Connery Sr. =

American politician (1855–1928)

34th Mayor of Lynn, Massachusetts
- In office 1911–1912
- Preceded by: James E. Rich
- Succeeded by: George H. Newhall

Personal details
- Born: September 1855
- Died: November 1928 (aged 73)
- Children: Lawrence J. Connery, William P. Connery, Jr.

William P. Connery Sr. (September 1855 – November 1928) was a Massachusetts politician who served as the 34th mayor of Lynn, Massachusetts. He was the father of U.S. Congressional Representatives Lawrence J. Connery and William P. Connery, Jr.

== Notes ==
Political offices
Preceded by James E. Rich	Mayor of Lynn, Massachusetts; 1911 to 1912	Succeeded by George H. Newhall
