= Conaire =

Conaire is an Irish language unisex name used mostly as a male given name. It gave rise to the original form of the anglicized surname Connery.

It is borne by two legendary High Kings of Ireland:

- Conaire Mór (the great)
- Conaire Cóem (the beautiful)

There was also a female Irish saint named Conaire (however she is more commonly known as Cannera or Connera)

Other name holders include:

- Pádraic Ó Conaire (1882–1928), Irish writer and journalist
- Achadh Conaire, the Irish name of the village of Achonry, County Sligo

== See also ==
- List of Irish-language given names
- Conair (disambiguation)
