= Gerd Tacke =

Gerd Tacke (20 August 1906 in Mittel-Sohra – 23 October 1997) was the CEO of Siemens from 1968 to 1971.

| Preceded by Ernst von Siemens | CEO of Siemens AG; 1968 – 1971 | Succeeded by Bernhard Plettner |
