= Alcoa Tenn Federal Credit Union =

Coordinates: 35.7677°N 83.9729°W

Alcoa Tenn Federal Credit Union (commonly ATFCU or Alcoa Tenn) is a credit union founded in the city of Alcoa, Tennessee that has since spread around Blount and Loudon, and Monroe Counties in Tennessee. Founded on July 9, 1936, as Plate Mill Employees Credit Union connected to the aluminum company ALCOA, the credit union is now a community credit union. It would gain its current name in 1959.

The credit union has assets over $350 million. Its current President/CEO is David Gill. ATFCU currently has five branches in the cities of Alcoa, Maryville, and Vonore. It is federally insured by the National Credit Union Administration and a member of the Tennessee Credit Union League.

Every year the credit union awards the Franklin E. Robinson Memorial Award to a local high school senior. The award is named for a long-serving engineer and former ATFCU board member.

== See also ==
- Alcoa
- Blount County, Tennessee
- City of Alcoa, Tennessee
- City of Maryville, Tennessee
- National Credit Union Administration
