= Bernhard Plettner =

German engineer and manager

Bernhard Plettner (December 2, 1914 in Oberlahnstein – November 2, 1997 in Erlangen) was a German engineer and manager. From 1971 to 1981 he was CEO of Siemens AG.

Plettner studied electrical engineering in Darmstadt. After an internship in 1937 he returned to Siemens-Schuckertwerke in Berlin in 1940. After World War II Plettner was especially engaged in restoring the export relations of the firm. Plettner became a member of the board of directors of Siemens-Schuckertwerke in 1959 and CEO of this company in 1962. After the merging of Siemens-Schuckertwerke with Siemens & Halske AG he was a member of the board of directors of Siemens AG. In 1971 he was appointed CEO. When he was succeeded by Karlheinz Kaske in 1981, Plettner became the first chairman of the supervisory board not to be a member of the Siemens family. He resigned in 1988.

Preceded by Gerd Tacke	CEO of Siemens AG; 1971 – 1981	Succeeded by Karlheinz Kaske
