= Arconic =

American industrial company

Arconic Corporation
- Type: Private
- Industry: Manufacturing
- Founded: April 1, 2020; 6 years ago in Pittsburgh, Pennsylvania
- Headquarters: Pittsburgh, Pennsylvania, U.S.
- Key people: Chris Ayers (CEO)
- Revenue: ▲US$8.96 billion (2022)
- Operating income: ▲US$−47 million (2022)
- Net income: ▲US$−182 million (2022)
- Total assets: ▼US$6.02 billion (2022)
- Total equity: ▼US$1.36 billion (2022)
- Owner: Apollo Global Management (2023–present)
- Number of employees: 11,550 (2022)
- Website: arconic.com

Arconic Corporation is an American industrial company specializing in lightweight metals engineering and manufacturing. Its products are used worldwide in aerospace, automotive, packaging, oil and gas, building and construction, defense, commercial transportation, consumer electronics, and industrial applications.

The business today known as Arconic was originally part of Alcoa Inc. The name Arconic was first used in 2016 when Alcoa Inc. was separated into two companies, Alcoa Corporation and Arconic Inc. Arconic Inc. was further separated in 2020 into Howmet Aerospace Inc., focused on engineered products, and Arconic Corporation, focused on rolled aluminium products. On August 18, 2023, private equity firm Apollo Global Management completed the acquisition of Arconic.

In 2024, the official inquiry into the 2017 Grenfell Tower fire in London, which killed 72 people, identified Arconic cladding as "by far the largest contributor" to the disaster. The company was found to have deliberately concealed the known fire risks, with the company's president, Claude Schmidt, admitting that Arconic obtained safety certification for the cladding in the UK through a "misleading half-truth."

== History ==
=== Corporate development ===
On November 1, 2016, Alcoa Inc. spun off its bauxite, alumina, and aluminium operations to a new company called Alcoa Corp. After that, Alcoa Inc. was renamed Arconic Inc., keeping operations in aluminium rolling (excluding the Warrick operations), aluminium plate, precision castings, and aerospace and industrial fasteners.

Klaus Kleinfeld, Arconic's CEO at the time of the Alcoa split, stepped down in April 2017. Arconic's board said he had displayed poor judgment in unauthorised interactions with activist shareholder Elliott Management (he sent a letter to Elliott founder Paul Singer making threatening insinuations about an incident involving "a Native American feather headdress and a rendition of 'Singin’ in the Rain' performed in a fountain" during a trip to the 2006 World Cup). After what the New York Times called a "Bruising and Public Dispute", Elliott was subsequently given three seats on Arconic's main board.

The company focuses on turning aluminium and other lightweight metals into engineered products such as turbine blades for sectors including aerospace and automotive. It traded on the New York Stock Exchange under the ARNC ticker.

In July 2018, Arconic announced a two-year joint development agreement with aerospace manufacturer Lockheed Martin, focused on technologies like metal 3D printing to produce new lightweight structures and systems, and a new long-term contract to supply aluminium products to Boeing.

On February 6, 2019, Arconic replaced CEO Chip Blankenship. His departure came two weeks after Arconic announced it was backed out of a sale to Apollo Global Management, a decision that sent Arconic shares tumbling, and put pressure on Arconic to make internal improvements. Two days later, on February 8, 2019, Arconic Inc. announced that it would split into two separate businesses. Arconic Inc. would be renamed Howmet Aerospace Inc. and a new company, Arconic Corporation, would be set up and spun out tax free from Arconic Inc. The new Arconic Corporation would be focused on rolled aluminium products and Howmet Aerospace on engineered products. The separation was completed effective April 1, 2020.

In April 2020, during the global COVID-19 pandemic, Arconic announced actions to mitigate the impacts of the disease, including director, senior manager and salaried employee pay cuts, restructuring of the salaried workforce, temporary closure of facilities in Tennessee and New York and decreased production at other US facilities, and similar measures at rolling mill facilities in Europe, China and Russia.

In November 2022, to comply with sanctions on Moscow over the Russian invasion of Ukraine, Arconic sold its operations in Russia to the owner of state-backed metals company VSMPO-AVISMA for $230 million.

In May 2023, Apollo Global Management agreed to acquire Arconic in an all-cash deal worth $5.2 billion, including debt. The purchase was completed in August 2023, when Chris Ayers was named as the new CEO of Arconic from September 11, 2023.

In January 2024, Arconic announced it was selling its China-based manufacturing operations in Qinhuangdao and Kunshan, employing about 860 people, in a deal worth up to $300 million. The China business was said to be subscale in comparison to other parts of Arconic, and had no sensitive intellectual property.

=== Grenfell Tower fire ===
Experts at the official inquiry into the 2017 Grenfell Tower fire in London identified Arconic's Reynobond PE rainscreen cladding as "by far the largest contributor" to the disaster, which had resulted in 72 deaths. The cladding had been installed on the residential tower block as part of a refurbishment in 2016. In November 2020, four France-based Arconic employees refused to give evidence to the inquiry, saying they might breach a 1968 French law preventing evidence being given to proceedings abroad. In January 2021, the building safety minister Lord Greenhalgh accused them of hiding behind the 1968 French blocking statute. The French embassy in London confirmed the statute did not apply to the Grenfell Inquiry, and in February 2021 Arconic president Claude Schmidt finally agreed to testify. He told the inquiry it was not his "priority" to understand UK fire safety processes, denied concealing failed fire safety tests of Arconic's aluminium composite material product, but agreed that Arconic's failure to notify the UK regulator, the British Board of Agrément, about the tests was a "misleading half truth".

The inquiry report, published in September 2024, found that the Arconic cladding in the form used at Grenfell Tower was "extremely dangerous". It noted that Arconic was aware of this, having commissioned fire tests on the product, but had since 2005 "deliberately concealed from the market the true extent of the danger". According to the inquiry report, the company aimed to exploit what it saw as regulatory weaknesses in countries such as the UK and it concluded that "Arconic ... promoted and sold a product knowing that it presented a significant danger to those who might use any buildings in which it was used." In a statement, Arconic's French business Arconic Architectural Products rejected that it had "sold an unsafe product", concealed information or misled any certification body, customer, or the public.

=== Discrimination suit ===
In May 2022, a former Arconic employee Daniel Snyder filed a federal lawsuit against the company alleging religious discrimination. Snyder lost his job at Arconic's Riverdale plant in June 2021 after publicly posting on the company's intranet an objection to the company using a rainbow to promote Gay Pride Month. Supported by the Thomas More Society, the case was referred to the United States Court of Appeals for the Eighth Circuit in April 2024. In August 2024, Snyder's appeal was dismissed.
