= William P. Connery Jr. =

American politician (1888–1937)

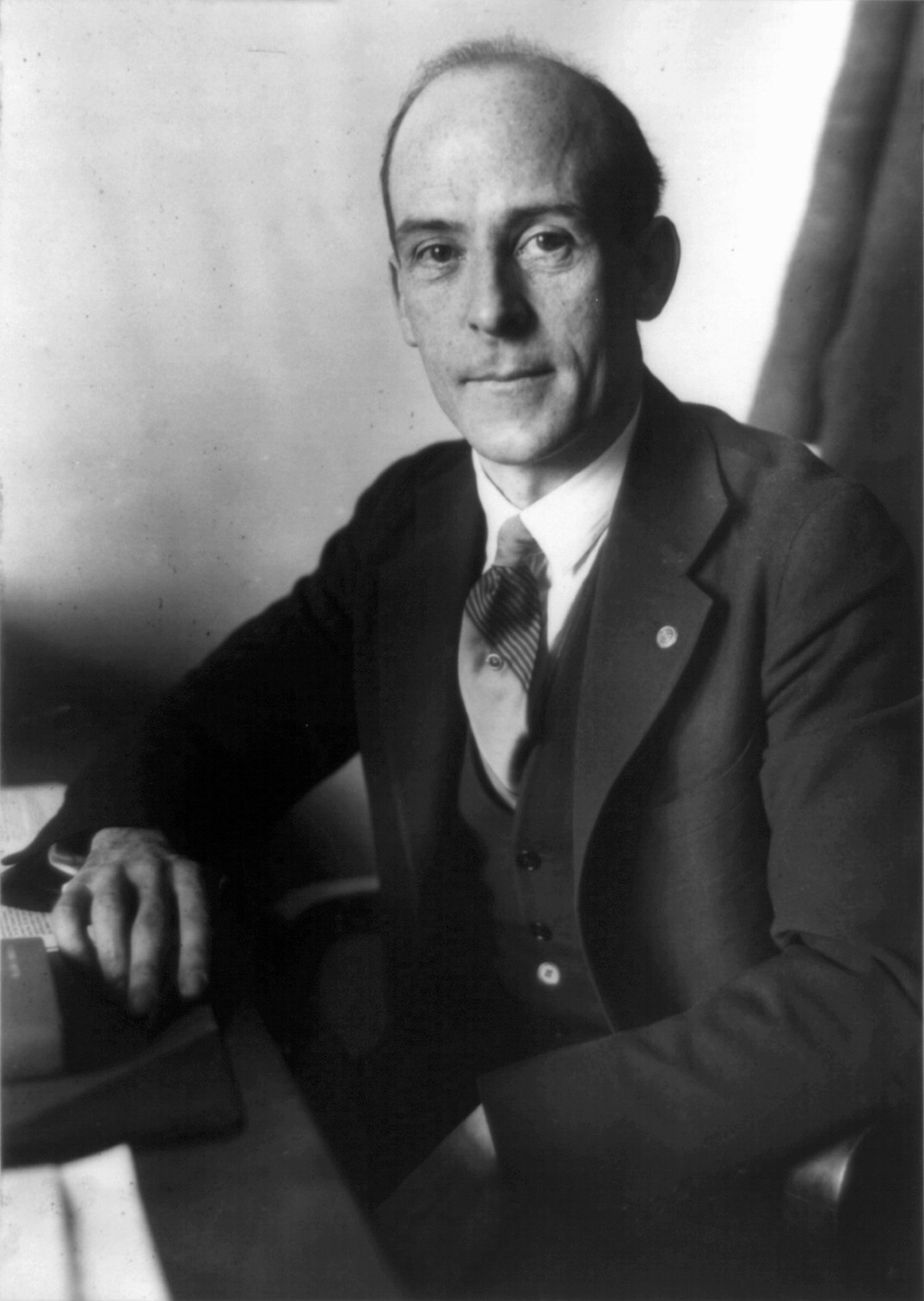

Member of the U.S. House of Representatives from Massachusetts's 7th district
- In office March 4, 1923 – June 15, 1937
- Preceded by: Robert S. Maloney
- Succeeded by: Lawrence J. Connery

Personal details
- Born: August 24, 1888 Lynn, Massachusetts, U.S.
- Died: June 15, 1937 (aged 48) Washington, D.C., U.S.
- Party: Democratic
- Parent: William P. Connery Sr.
- Education: College of the Holy Cross
- Profession: Actor, theater manager

Military service
- Allegiance: United States of America
- Branch/service: U.S. Army
- Rank: Private
- Unit: First Regiment, United States Infantry
- Battles/wars: World War I France

William Patrick Connery Jr. (August 24, 1888 – June 15, 1937) was a United States representative from Massachusetts. He was born in Lynn on August 24, 1888, the son of William P. Connery Sr. and brother of Lawrence Joseph Connery.

== Early life ==
Connery attended St. Mary's School at Lynn, Collège de Montréal in Canada, and the College of the Holy Cross. He entered the theatrical profession as an actor. He also was a theater manager. During World War I he enlisted as a private in the One Hundred and First Regiment, United States Infantry, and served nineteen months in France. He was an electric company employee, he engaged in the manufacture of candy, and was secretary to the mayor of Lynn.

== Political career ==
He was elected as a Democrat in 1923 to the Sixty-eighth US Congress, serving from March 4, 1923, until his death on June 15, 1937. He served as chairman of the Committee on Labor from 1931 to 1939, where he was the House sponsor of the first version of H.R. 7200, the Fair Labor Standards Act (alternatively the Wagner-Connery Act, named after himself and U.S. Senator Robert F. Wagner). It became law in a later iteration when it was signed by President Roosevelt on June 25, 1938, though this occurred after Connery had died. He studied law, and was admitted to the bar but did not practice extensively.

Connery had returned by train from a speaking tour in Massachusetts when he was stricken by food poisoning after returning to his home in Washington, D.C. Experiencing acute abdominal pains, he was taken to the National Homeopathic Hospital. His condition worsened and did not respond to treatment, and Connery died at the age of 48, only 11 hours after he had been admitted, on June 15, 1937. His interment was in St. Mary's Cemetery in Lynn.

== See also ==
- List of members of the United States Congress who died in office (1900–1949)

U.S. House of Representatives
| Preceded by Robert S. Maloney | Member of the U.S. House of Representatives from Massachusetts's 7th congressional district March 4, 1923 – June 15, 1937 | Succeeded by Lawrence J. Connery |
