= HTC Canary =

Mobile phone model

HTC Canary is a smartphone released in November 2002 in Europe and China by the providers Orange and China Mobile, respectively. It was notable for being the first smartphone to run Windows Mobile.

== Specifications ==
Manufacturer: HTC
Distributor: Orange, China Mobile
Availability: Europe, China
Design type: Candybar
Released: November 2002
Operating System: Smartphone 2002
Memory: Ti OMAP 710 132 MHz
Additional Memory: SD & MMC cards
Screen Resolution: 176x220 64k colors
Bands: Tri-band GSM 900,1800,1900
Data: GPRS, WAP
Messaging: SMS, Email
Camera: Plug in adapter
IRDA: Yes
Bluetooth: No
WiFi: No
Java: No
Dimensions: 115 millimetres (4.5 in) x 46 millimetres (1.8 in) x 22 millimetres (0.87 in)
Weight: 127 grams (4.5 oz)
Battery: Li-Ion 1000 mAh
Talk time: 3-5 Hours
Standby: 70-100 Hours
Ringtone: WAV, MIDI
Media Sounds: WMA, MP3
Media video: WMV
Speakers: One
