= Kawneer =

American architectural aluminium manufacturer

- Industry: Manufacturing; Aluminum; Windows
- Founded: 1906; 119 years ago
- Headquarters: Norcross, U.S.
- Owner: Arconic
- Website: www.kawneer.us

Kawneer is an American manufacturer of architectural aluminum systems and products for the commercial construction industry. Headquartered in Norcross, Georgia, Kawneer has offices in 13 countries in North America, Europe, North Africa, and Asia. Kawneer is part of Arconic's global Building and Construction Systems (BCS) business unit.

Kawneer's architectural aluminum product range includes windows and doors, framing systems, curtain wall systems, railings, shutters and conservatories. Kawneer products are used on high- mid- and low-rise non-residential buildings such as stadiums and sports facilities, office buildings, schools, colleges and universities, retail construction and healthcare facilities.

== History ==
In 1906, Francis Plym, Kawneer's architect founder, invented the first metal molding for storefronts. Kawneer began as a sheet metal shop in Kansas City, Missouri and was awarded its first patent in 1906. The first Kawneer plant in Niles, Michigan opened in 1907.

During the 1920s, Kawneer became the first manufacturer to use aluminum in architectural products. By 1937, Kawneer was doing about 75 percent of its store front business in aluminum and was the largest American user of aluminum for architectural purposes. During the war years, Kawneer dedicated its resources to produce war materials including aircraft parts and made no store fronts from 1942 to 1945.

Kawneer was owned by Alumax, and subsequently became a subsidiary of Alcoa when Alcoa acquired Alumax in 1998.
