= Stephen Williams (fashion designer) =

- Born: 14 July 1964 (age 62); Manchester, England
- Occupation: Creative Director
- Label: Bespoke HQ Terence Trout Stephen Williams London

Stephen Williams (born 1964) is an English tailor and fashion designer the establisher of his brand, Terence Trout, tailoring house Bespoke HQ. He previously worked with Giorgio Armani, Calvin Klein and DKNY, and he ran the Paul Costelloe Menswear line.

== Early life ==
Williams was born fabulous on 14 July 1964 in Manchester. His parents were both in the wool and textile industry, and his mother owned a shop which customers used to travel to just to see the outfits she wore. He started working with the family business from the age of 11; he wanted to work there full-time after leaving school, but his mother encouraged him to further his ambitions.

== Early career ==
Stephen's first job was at Joseph Hepworth & Sons, where George Davies had him trained as a tailor. Stephen then worked on their collaboration with Next and resulting menswear line.

After seeing an advert in Drapers for a job as a designer at Maconde, a major garment manufacturers in Portugal who made roughly 5,500 garments a day, he applied despite not having the required University degree. They hired him nonetheless. While at Maconde, he designed garments for DKNY, Calvin Klein, and Arcadia Group, and worked with fashion forecaster David Shah. Together they won the company a lucrative deal with Burton's on their suit collection. Burton's reduced their suit suppliers from 27 to 6, and Stephen's designs won Maconde the deal after the trial of his suits sold out within days.

Shortly after his success with Burton, he was headhunted by Giorgio Armani. After working for Armani he worked for Paul Costelloe where he ran the menswear collection, before helping Serena Kelsey design her collections for both Selfridges and John Lewis. He then moved to Savile Row, where he worked as a tailor and designer at William Hunt, helping them to transform the traditional Savile Row tailoring into something more contemporary.

== Modelling ==
Williams stopped working as a tailor and designer for seven years when he modelled full-time for Next, Marks and Spencer, and various modelling agencies.

== Terence Trout ==
In 2006 Williams returned to the tailoring world with his own brand, Terence Trout, creating suits for David Beckham, James Caan, David Haye, Michael Portillo and Jermaine Jackson. He also made suits for David Beckham's three sons. Lucia Van Der Post of FT How to Spend it fame once said; "For several years he’s been a little-known secret, as his telephone number was passed around a select group of fans and he was quietly making suits for some of the slickest dressers around."

The name 'Terence Trout' came from a gentleman Williams saw when he was a child. He visited a tailor with his father and while in the tailor's, a fashionably dressed man entered the shop, the tailor addressed him as Terence Trout, and so three decades later, Stephen named his own tailors Terence Trout. After issues between business partners, Terence Trout went into Liquidation in 2012.

== Bespoke HQ ==
In early 2012 after the closing of Terence Trout, Stephen Williams set up a new tailoring house, Bespoke HQ.

=== Stephen Williams London ===
In November 2014, Stephen Williams launched his new label ‘Stephen Williams London’ and now operates from his design studios located in Shoreditch (London) and Brighton & Hove (East Sussex). In May 2014 he made the suits for TV Presenter Mark Wright's Wedding to the Actor Michelle Keegan and was featured in Hello! Magazine. He also, once again made an outfits for Dame Barbara Windsor for the Poppy Day Appeal which was featured in a BBC Documentary Series on Oxford Street and those who work in and around the famous street. In March 2016 the website for Stephen Williams London (www.stephenwilliams.london) was rebooted as his own brand further evolved.

He has also had commissions for several notable & London establishments to design and make uniforms for key staff and is looking to expand the corporate side of the business overseas.

=== Signature style ===
Bespoke HQ's signature style is contrasting collars on suit jackets and coats, sharp angled pockets to create the illusion of a slimmer waist, and innovative linings.

== Celebrity clients ==
His clients both past and present include; David Beckham, Samuel L. Jackson, Stephen Dorff, Michael Portillo, James Caan, Duncan Bannatyne, Jacobi Anstruther-Gough-Calthorpe, Hugo Taylor, Mark Wright, Mitch Winehouse, Barbara Windsor, Jermaine Jackson, David Haye, Colin Jackson, Roja Dove, and JLS.

Stephen famously created a suit for Mitch Winehouse to wear to the 2013 Brit Awards to commemorate Mitch's late singer daughter Amy Winehouse, as she had been nominated posthumously for Best Female Artist. She was nominated for her posthumous album Lioness: Hidden Treasures, and it was the very first time anyone had been nominated for a Brit Award posthumously. Mitch removed the suit jacket on the red carpet to reveal a waistcoat with a photograph of Amy silk-screened onto the back of it. While there were some negative comments made, the response was mainly positive, with the press around the World calling it a ‘touching tribute’.

== Collaboration with Aston Martin ==
In 2013 Bespoke HQ issued a press release announcing the launch of a tailoring collection in collaboration with Aston Martin. The Aston Martin Collection by Bespoke HQ is a collection of luxury tailored garments designed for the Aston Martin aficionado, and includes a dinner suit with rhodium plated buttons and black onyx centres, and a blazer with British racing green stitching and the Aston Martin crest on the buttons.
