= Canary wood =

Canary wood or canary whitewood is a name used to a number of species:

- From Liriodendron commonly known as tulip trees
- Indian mulberry Morinda citrifolia
- Wood from the genus Centrolobium
- Wood from the genus Persea; Persea indica and (Apollonias barbujana Syn.: Persea canariensis)
- Wood from Eucalyptus moluccana and Nauclea orientalis Leichhardt's pine or cheesewood, from Australia its also named canary wood
