= Cora Frances Stoddard =

American temperance activist

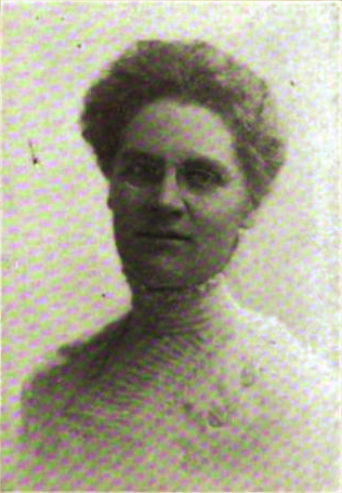
Cora Frances Stoddard (1919)

Cora Frances Stoddard (September 17, 1872 – May 13, 1936) was an American temperance activist.

Stoddard was born on September 17, 1872, in Irvington, Nebraska, to Julia F. (Miller) and Emerson H. Stoddard. She received an AB from Wellesley College in 1896. After graduating, she worked as a teacher in Middletown, Connecticut.

Stoddard represented the United States at the 12th International Conference on Alcoholism in London. As of 1914, she was the secretary of the Scientific Temperance Foundation, a successor organization to the Department of Scientific Temperance Instruction of the Woman's Christian Temperance Union. Stoddard had worked as a secretary to Mary Hunt when she headed the department.

She died on May 13, 1936, in Oxford, Connecticut.
