= Canary Burton =

American composer

Canary Lee Burton (born September 16, 1942) is an American keyboardist, composer and writer.

== Biography ==
Burton was born on September 16, 1942, in Richmond, California. In 1972 she moved to Moscow, Idaho, to attend the University of Idaho where she was one of the first women to be accepted into the music composition program. After passing her third-year piano exam, she left to form her own rock ’n roll band and play in various rock and jazz ensembles. She attracted followers through her gigs, but she came to find performance unfulfilling and turned to composition.

She relocated to Washington D.C., where she worked at WPFW Pacifica radio for three years. She then moved to Cape Cod, Massachusetts, where she established her own contemporary music radio show, The Latest Score, on WOMR in Provincetown. While founding and playing in various rock and jazz ensembles, Burton continued her studies—with Kevin Toney in jazz in 1980, with David Sussman in 1988, with John Zielinski in composition from 1990 to 1992, and briefly with Rodney Lister at the New England Conservatory in Boston, Massachusetts, in 1995. She worked as a music teacher from 1996 to 2000.

Selected pieces of her work were included in the published collection Music of Living Composers, compiled by the Campbell University piano professor and composer Betty Wishart in 1997. In 2014, Southern River won the PatsyLu Prize in the annual Search for New Music competition of the International Alliance for Women in Music.

Burton's works have been performed internationally. Her music, with information about her work, is archived in the Wellfleet Public Library in Massachusetts and in Italy in the library of the Fondazione Adkins Chiti: Donne in Musica. She is the recipient of an ASCAP Plus Award, which supports ASCAP members whose works have a unique prestige value for which adequate compensation would not otherwise be received. Some of her music from the 1970s, 1980s, and 1990s may be heard online and the sheet music downloaded.

== Selected works ==
- Sometime After One (1982), for piano
- Gaia Morning, Gaia Noon, Gaia Night (1987), for piano
- Costa Brava (1989), for piano
- Atlantic Sonata (1992), for piano
- The Promise (1993), for voice and piano
- Archeological Record (2008), for piano.
- Daniella’s Hope (2008), for piano four-hands
- Whispers (2011), for guitar
- String Theory (2011), for string orchestra
- Chopin Slept (2011), for piano trio
- In the Beginning, for organ
- A Green and Yellow Basket, for organ
- Solo Viola, for solo viola
- Clara Young, for voice and piano
- American Lullaby, for voice and piano
- Early in the Morning, for voice and piano
- The Tea Party: The Tea Party; Dancing with my Teddy; Playing Dress Up; Ad Hoc
- Folksong for My Mother piano
- Victoria's Harp, for piano
- Southern River, for cello and viola
- We Want to Pond Naked, for voice, flute, oboe, piano
- No More Violins, for violin and piano
- The Twelfth of Cold, for piano, viola, violin, clarinet, bass, cello, in three movements: Fairy Boat; Snow Imp; Frost Heaves
- Viola Thinks 2, viola solo
- Sparcity, for viola, bass, flute, tuba
- Sri Rama, for piano
- Nightfall in the City, for piano and voice
- Refugee, for.guitar and voice
- Indian Voices, electroacoustic

One-minute pieces

- La Compara, for piano, trumpet and clarinet
- Cuban Love, for piano
- Dust Bunnies, for piano
- Minute Meld, electroacoustic
- Viola Thinks 1, for viola solo

Jazz

- Familiarity (1977), lead sheet, jazz, one instrument
- Meteor Shower (1977), jazz/instrumental
- Companion (2006), for jazz piano
- Companion, extended for bass, piano and flute
- Lulu's Rag, for jazz band
- Sinuosity, for flute, oboe, piano
- Solar Reflection, for jazz band
- Ya Gotta Be Kiddin, for piano
- Sigred's Lullaby, for piano
- Raggity Three Step, for piano
- Turkey Too
- Tritone Subrosa
- Monkish

Burton's music has been recorded and issued on CD, including:

- Piano Music from Cape Cod (Seabird Studio, 2003) Canary Burton, piano
- Women in Harmony (Tempus Floridum, 2010)
- Classical Bird: The Music of Canary Burton (2014)
- Jazz Bird (2014) Canary Burton, piano; Jarvis Trio
- Bird Notes (2014).
- Bird Song: Canary Burton and Friends
- Live at the Center (Roxana Bajdechi, pianist)
- Lou Lou and Bird: Soundpaintings 2012 (Canary Burton and Marylou Blakeslee)
- Lou Lou and Bird: Soundpaintings 2014 (Canary Burton and Marylou Blakeslee)
