= Alain J. P. Belda =

Canadian businessman

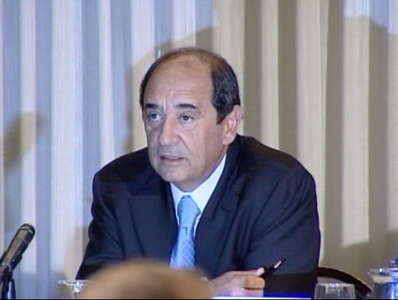
- Born: June 23, 1943 (age 83); Meknes, Morocco
- Education: Mackenzie Presbyterian University (BA '69)
- Spouse: Haydee Esteves

Alain Juan Pablo Belda Fernández (born 23 June 1943) is a Spanish-Brazilian-American businessman who has been a managing director of Warburg Pincus since 2009. Previously, he was the chairman of the board of Alcoa from January 2001; he was chief executive officer from January 2001 until May 2008.

== Business experience ==
- Taiama Foundation
- Conference Board
- Foreign Affairs Council
- Brown board of Trustees
- International Advisory Board of Bank of America
- International Advisory Board of Chubb
- Board Member of Renault from 2009 to 2017
- Board member of IBM from 2009 to 2016
- Board Member of Citibank from 1997 to 2012
- Board Member Dupont from
- Limited Special Partner of Warburg Pincus from 2018
- Managing Partner Warburg Pincus 2009 to 2018
- Non Executive chairman of the board of Alcoa from April 2009 to June 2010-
- Executive chairman of the board of Alcoa from April 2008 to April 2009
- Chief executive officer and chairman of the board from January 2001 to April 2008
- President and chief executive officer of Alcoa from May 1999 to January 2001
- President and chief operating officer of Alcoa from 1997 to May 1999
- Alcoa's vice chairman from 1995 to 1997
- Executive vice president from 1994 to 1995;
- From 1979 to 1994, he was president of Alcoa Aluminio S.A. in Brazil, Alcoa's Brazilian affiliate

== Compensation ==
While CEO of Alcoa in 2007, Belda earned a total compensation of $25,931,201, which included a base salary of $1,457,500, a cash bonus of $1,000,000, stocks granted of $6,978,791, and options granted of $13,558,026.

== Controversies ==
On October 6, 2005, in the paper EXAME in São Paulo, Brazil, there appeared an article by journalist Alexa Salomão, where Belda was quoted as saying Alcoa was paying Brazilians twice as much for energy for the corporation's Brazilian aluminum smelters, as it was paying Iceland's state-run energy firm Landsvirkjun: "...the agreed price — 30 dollars per megawatt-hour — was far from ideal. In Iceland, the company pays half that." When this news reached Icelandic media, on June 7, 2006, the reaction was negative from environmentalists opposed to the already controversial Kárahnjúkar Hydropower Plant, and others, as Icelandic citizens and other firms pay eight times that.

Friðrik Sophusson, the director of Landsvirkjun, said the quoted price was ridiculous, the real price being somewhat higher. A New York spokesperson for Alcoa said Belda had been "inaccurate" in the interview.

An Icelandic social-democratic member of parliament, Helgi Hjörvar, who is on the board of Landsvirkjun, challenged authorities to reveal the real price and thus "clear the air" surrounding the project—the dam and the smelter. No answer was ever received. Representatives of Alcoa finally apologized to Landsvirkjun for the slip-up, Salomão's article was removed from Alcoa's website.

== Other directorships ==
Citigroup Inc. and E. I. du Pont de Nemours and Company and International Business Machines. Mr. Belda serves on the board of trustees of The Conference Board, the world's leading business membership and research organization, and is a member of the board of trustees of the Brown University Corporation.
