= Lawrence J. Connery =

American politician

Lawrence Joseph Connery
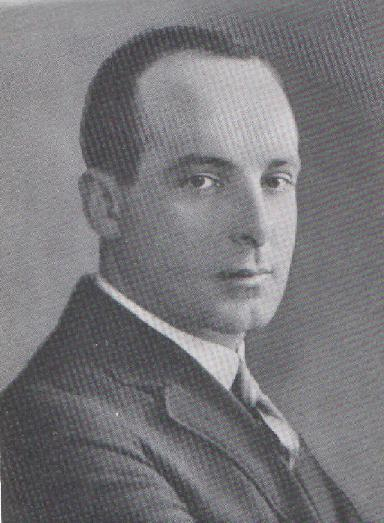

Member of the U.S. House of Representatives from Massachusetts's 7th district
- In office September 28, 1937 – October 19, 1941
- Preceded by: William P. Connery Jr.
- Succeeded by: Thomas J. Lane

Personal details
- Born: October 17, 1895 Lynn, Massachusetts
- Died: October 19, 1941 (aged 46) Arlington, Virginia
- Education: St. Mary's College, Georgetown University Law School

Military service
- Allegiance: United States
- Branch/service: United States Army
- Years of service: 1916; March 25, 1917 - March 24, 1919
- Unit: Company A, 9th Massachusetts Infantry; Company A, 101st Infantry Regiment; 26th Division
- Battles/wars: Mexican Expedition; World War I France

Lawrence Joseph Connery (October 17, 1895 – October 19, 1941) was a U.S. representative from Massachusetts.

== Life and career ==
Connery was born in Lynn, Massachusetts on October 17, 1895. He attended the local parochial and public schools, and St. Mary's College, St. Mary's, Kansas.

He was employed as a reporter for The Lynn Item; served on the Mexican border in 1916 with Company A, 9th Massachusetts Infantry; served with Company A, Company A, 101st Infantry Regiment, 26th Division from March 25, 1917, until honorably discharged on March 24, 1919, with nineteen months service in France.

He went on to work as chief purser aboard a United Fruit Company ship (1919–23). From 1923-37, he was secretary (chief administrative assistant) for his brother, Congressman William Patrick Connery, Jr.

He graduated from Georgetown University Law School, Washington, D.C. in 1926; engaged in the office-supplies and printing business in 1934 in Lynn, Massachusetts.

== Last years and death ==
Connery was elected as a Democrat to the Seventy-fifth Congress to fill the vacancy caused by the death of his brother, William. He was re-elected to the Seventy-sixth and Seventy-seventh Congresses and served from September 28, 1937 until his death from a heart attack in Arlington, Virginia on October 19, 1941, aged 46. He was interred in St. Mary's Cemetery, Lynn, Massachusetts.

== See also ==
- List of members of the United States Congress who died in office (1900–1949)

U.S. House of Representatives
Preceded by William P. Connery, Jr.	Member of the U.S. House of Representatives from Massachusetts's 7th congressional district September 28, 1937 – October 19, 1941	Succeeded by Thomas J. Lane
