= Steve Williams (businessman) =

English businessman (born 1956)

- Born: 5 February 1956 (age 70); Bristol, England
- Education: University of Exeter (BSc '77)
- Known for: Chairman of Enbridge
- Spouse: Mary Williams

Steven Walter Williams (born 5 February 1956) is an English engineer, oilman, and executive who is the current chairman of Enbridge. He is the former chairman of Alcoa and former president of Suncor.

Williams began his career in 1977 with the Esso Petroleum Company Limited, the British affiliate of Exxon. In 2002, Williams moved to Canada where he joined Suncor as chief financial officer. In 2012, he was appointed president of the company, and remained in the role until 2018. In May 2025, Williams was elected chairman of Enbridge.

== Biography ==
He was the president and CEO of Suncor Energy from 2012 to 2019. He was COO from 2007 to 2011. Prior to joining Suncor as executive in May 2002, he was an executive at Innospec. Prior to that, he served was with Esso. During his career, Williams has served on the boards of Alcoa Corporation and the Business Council of Canada, and has been active in promoting sustainable development and innovation within the energy sector.

In 2018, as CEO, Williams placed third out of 100 of the top earners in Calgary with a total compensation of $14,789,407 according to a Global Governance Advisors' survey posted by The Calgary Herald.
