= William Collier (colonist) =

Grocer and member of the Plymouth Colony

- Born: c. 1585; England
- Died: 1671; Duxbury, Massachusetts Colony
- Occupations: purveyor Commissioner; Assistant to the Governor

William Collier (c. 1585–1671) was an English colonist in Massachusetts Colony. He came to Plymouth Colony in 1633 as one of the few London-based Merchant Adventurers, a colony investment group, to settle in New England. He was often elected as an Assistant Governor in the thirty-some years between 1634/5 and 1665. He was on the side of the government leaders in the historic 1645 dispute with liberal religious leader William Vassall. During his long life involved in public service, he served on the Council of War and served at times as a commissioner of the United Colonies, a New England colonies military alliance primarily for defense against Indian attack.

== English Origins ==
William Collier was born in England about 1585, based on the date of his marriage, and son of Abraham Collier and wife. He was a purveyor grocer in England being apprenticed to William Russell, becoming a member of the Grocer's Company of London on March 3, 1627/8. He was a resident of St. Olave in Southwark (London), operating a brew-house, per William Bradford's reference to a "brew-house of Mr. Collier's in London." Records show that he was also a resident St. Mary Magdalen Parish, Bermondsey (London).

== England - Merchant Adventurers ==
While residing in England in 1626, Collier's signature appears on an agreement with the names of fifty-eight Purchasers, the new investment group for Plymouth Colony, replacing the previous group, the Merchant Adventurers. The colony debt would be assumed by a small new group titled "the Undertakers" composed of colony leaders. The Purchasers were privileged above all others in future colony land grants, with Collier's signature on the agreement as "Mr. Wm Collyer."

== In Plymouth Colony ==
Collier and his family came to Plymouth in 1633 on an unknown ship, possibly the ship Mary and Jane, which sailed from London in March, 1633.

He was praised by Nathaniel Morton: "This year (1633) likewise Mr. William Collier arrived with his Family in New-England, who as he had been a good Benefactor to the Colony of New-Plimouth before he came over, having been an Adventurer unto it at its first beginning; so also he approved himself a very useful instrument in that Jurisdiction after he arrived, being frequently Chosen, and for divers years serving God and the Country in the place of Magistracy, and lived a godly and holy life [sic] until old age".

On January 2, 1633/34 his name appears as one of 80 names on tax rates being assessed by the new governor, Thomas Prence.

In 1633/4 Collier was admitted a freeman. He moved to Duxbury, Massachusetts, after 1639.

Between 1634/5 and 1665 he was often elected one of the Assistants to the Governor and appeared to side with the more conservative leaders.

Collier was on the Council of War, and served at times as a commissioner of the United Colonies, a military group composed of New England Puritan colonies against the Indians.

In 1646, Collier was one of the conservative Assistants in opposition to what became known as the "Bay Colony Remonstrance" initiated supposedly by William Vassall. This was related to an incident in 1645 whereby Vassall had petitioned the Plymouth General Court asking for full religious toleration for all well-behaving men - i.e. freedom of religion. Many of the town deputies and Assistants, including senior leader Myles Standish, were in favor of the Vassall petition, but with Governor Bradford and Assistants Collier, Thomas Prence and Edward Winslow opposed. The petition could have passed, but for delaying action by Bradford giving the conservative side time to maneuver against it, which ultimately spelled its defeat.

Collier resided in Duxbury and in 1649/50 he deeded ten acres of land in Duxbury to "my kinsman William Clark", which may refer to him being a relative of his wife Jane.

On 7 June 1653, his wife Mrs. Jane Collier made a claim on behalf of her grandchild, the wife of Nathaniel Warren.

Thomas Prence, known as that "Terrour to evill doers", as written by Nathaniel Morton, was not known for being lenient towards Quakers. Two of them were Arthur and Henry Howland, brothers of Mayflower passenger and Assistant John Howland. About December 22, 1657, Collier and Capt. Josiah Winslow, sent Constable John Philips of Marshfield to a Quaker meeting at Arthur Howland's house in Marshfield, Massachusetts, to arrest the Quaker leader, Robert Huchin. But as Philips reported, he could not arrest Huchin as he was being hindered by Howland, who told the Constable "hee would have either a sword or gun in the belly of him". Ironically, ten years later Arthur Howland Jr. the son of Arthur, would marry Thomas Prence's daughter Elizabeth.

On December 2, 1661, Collier of Duxbury, Gentleman, with the consent of Mrs. Jane Collier, sold all his house and land that he was living on in Duxbury to Benjamin Bartlett, who was not to enter into possession until the death of both William and Jane Collier.

=== Family of William Collier ===
Collier married Jane Yates Clark, daughter of Henry Yates and wife Alice (maiden name unknown) (d. Hingham, Norfolk, April 11, 1602), at St. Olave Parish in Southwark on May 16, 1611, and had thirteen children. Many of those children died young, and they only had four daughters with them in Plymouth Colony. Jane died after June 28, 1666. Her burial place is unknown. Her sister Mary Clark (d. Hingham, Massachusetts, June 22, 1681) married Edward Gilman (Caston, Norfolk, April 20, 1587 - Exeter, New Hampshire, June 22, 1655) and had issue.

Children of William and Jane Collier:

- Mary was baptized in Southwark (then in Surrey - now a London Borough) on February 18, 1611/2 and died on March 29, 1673. She married Thomas Prence, later long-time Plymouth Colony Governor, on April 1, 1635, in Plymouth as his second wife and had two children. She died before 1644. The first wife of Thomas Prence was Patience Brewster, daughter of Elder William Brewster.
- Hannah was baptized in Southwark on September 14, 1613, and was buried there on August 31, 1625.
- Rebecca was baptized in Southwark on January 10, 1614/5, and died in Eastham, Massachusetts, on December 29, 1698. She married Job Cole in Plymouth on May 15, 1634, and had three children. He died after 1683 and before his wife’s death. His brother Daniel Cole married Rebecca’s sister Ruth. Rebecca and Job were both were buried at Cove Burying Ground, Eastham, Massachusetts.
- Sarah was baptized in Southwark on April 30, 1616, and died in Plymouth, Mass. on April 26, 1691. She was buried on Burial Hill in Plymouth, Massachusetts.

She married:
1. Love Brewster, son of Pilgrim Elder William Brewster and wife Mary Brewster, on May 15, 1634 in Plymouth and had four children. He died in 1650.
2. Richard Parke of Cambridge after September 1, 1656.

- John (1) was baptized in Southwark on March 18, 1616/7, and buried there August 24, 1618.
- Elizabeth was baptized in Southwark on March 9, 1618/9, and died sometime after her husband's will was written, February 10, 1678/9. She married Constant Southworth, the step-son of Pilgrim William Bradford, on November 2, 1637, in Plymouth and had eight children. Her burial place is unknown.
- John (2) was baptized in Southwark on March 23, 1619/20, and buried there August 6, 1625.
- Catheren was buried in Southwark on January 13, 1621/2.
- James was baptized in Bermondsey (then in Surrey - now in Southwark Borough, London) on March 16, 1622/3 and buried in Southwark on August 24, 1624.
- Martha was baptized in Bermondsey on March 28, 1624, and buried in Southwark on May 30, 1625.
- William was buried in Southwark on August 12, 1625.
- Lydia was baptized in Southwark on March 8, 1625/6, and buried there four days later.
- Ruth was born about 1628 probably in the London area as were the other children, and died in Eastham, Massachusetts. on December 15, 1694. She married Daniel Cole by 1644 and had at least five children. Daniel Cole was the brother of Job Cole who was married to Ruth's sister Rebecca. Ruth and Daniel were both buried in Cove Burying Ground in Eastham, Massachusetts.

== Death and burial ==
William Collier died sometime before July 5, 1671, when men were appointed to administer his estate. He was buried in Myles Standish Burial Ground, Duxbury.
