= Isaac Allerton Jr. =

American politician (1627–1702)

Colonel Isaac Allerton Junior

Member of the House of Burgesses representing Westmoreland County
- In office 1696-1697 Serving with Alexander Spence
- Preceded by: John Jordan
- Succeeded by: John Scott
- In office 1680-1684 Serving with William Presley, Peter Pressley, William Pierce, William Hardidge, Lawrence Washington
- Preceded by: John Washington
- Succeeded by: William Hardidge

Member of the House of Burgesses representing Northumberland County
- In office 1668-1677 Serving with William Presley, Peter Pressley
- Preceded by: William Presley
- Succeeded by: William Pierce

Member of the House of Burgesses representing Westmoreland County
- In office 1667
- Preceded by: Nicholas Spencer
- Succeeded by: Nicholas Spencer

Personal details
- Born: Isaac Allerton Jr. c. 1627/1630 Plymouth Colony
- Died: after October 25, 1702 Narrow's Plantation, Westmoreland County, Virginia
- Spouse(s): Elizabeth (----); Elizabeth Willoughby Overzee Colclough
- Children: 5
- Parent(s): Isaac Allerton; Fear Brewster
- Education: Harvard College
- Occupation: Planter, politician, soldier, merchant

Col. Isaac Allerton Jr. (c. 1627/1630 – December 30, 1702) was planter, military officer, politician and merchant in colonial America. Like his father, he first traded in New England, and after his father's death, in Virginia. There, he served on the Governor's Council (1687-1691) and for many years in the House of Burgesses, representing Northumberland County and later Westmoreland County.

== Early and family life ==
Born in Plymouth, Massachusetts, sometime after May 22, 1627, and before September 21, 1631 (since no birth record has been found), his father and grandfather were among the colony's leaders. His father Isaac Allerton Sr. had emigrated to what was then known as the Plymouth Colony on the ship Mayflower, as a Pilgrim. His father's first wife, Mary Norris, had died the following winter, on February 25, 1621. Thus the younger Isaac Allerton had 3 half-siblings (all born in Leiden, Holland): Bartholomew, Remember and Mary, the last surviving passenger of the Mayflower.

His mother Fear Brewster, was the elder Allerton's second wife, and the daughter of Elder William Brewster. the colony's spiritual and political leader, who had also sailed aboard the Mayflower as well as signed the Mayflower Compact. Her mother was Mary Brewster, and Fear Brewster arrived at Plymouth, Massachusetts on July 10, 1623, aboard the Anne. Another passenger on the Anne was this man's aunt Sarah Allerton, who had married Degory Priest who had also arrived on the Mayflower and signed the Mayflower Compact. The widowed Sarah had married Priest in a dual wedding with Isaac Allerton Sr. and his first wife.

Fear Brewster Allerton died sometime before December 12, 1634. Disagreements with fellow Plymouth Colonists concerning his commingling his own merchant accounts with the colony's payments to the Merchant Adventurers for funding the Mayflower voyage increased after his second wife's death. Also, he had previously established a trading post in Maine, which interfered with the colony's monopoly on the fur trade and later with a British treaty. Thus, the elder Allerton moved south to the New Haven Colony. However, young Isaac did not initially join him. Instead he was raised by his maternal grandfather William Brewster, and eventually joined the family of his uncle Love Brewster. Meanwhile, by 1644, when elder Brewster died, the elder Isaac Allerton had again remarried, to his third wife, Joanna Swinnerton.

=== Education ===
His grandfather Brewster tutored young Isaac before he entered college. He graduated from Harvard College in Cambridge, Massachusetts in 1650.

=== Marriage and family ===
Allerton married twice. He married his first wife, Elizabeth (...) in New Haven, Connecticut in 1652–3. Before her death, they had two children, Elizabeth (1653–1740) and Isaac (1655-?). Elizabeth was born on September 27, 1653 in New Haven, Connecticut and first married Benjamin Starr, who was born in Yarmouth, Massachusetts, the grandson of Doctor Comfort Starr of Boston (who emigrated from Ashford, Kent and founded Cambridge, Massachusetts and Harvard College) and nephew of Hannah Starr, the wife of John Cutt (the first President of the Province of New Hampshire). Following Starr's early death, Elizabeth married his first cousin Simon Ayers (or Eyres or Eyre) of New Haven.

His son Isaac (the third of the name) was born at New Haven on June 11, 1655. He accompanied his father to Virginia when he was a child, but returned to New Haven about 1683 and lived there most of the remainder of his life.

In 1663, Allerton married as his second wife the twice-widowed Elizabeth Willoughby (Overzee) Colclough. They had three daughters and a son:

== Career ==
Circa 1660, the widower moved his family to Virginia's Northern Neck. Initially he had settled in Wicomico in Gloucester County on waterfront land near the plantation of Col. Richard Lee II, who later served with him on the Governor's Council and invested in land further upstream on the Potomac River in what became Northumberland and Westmoreland Counties. Allerton and his descendants became wealthy as planters in Virginia, with indentured servants, and ultimately owned a 2,150-acre (8.7 km^{2}) plantation on the south side of the Rappahannock River. As a tobacco planter-merchant Allerton probably constructed a wharf and warehouse (as his father had done in New Amsterdam) since financial success required both growing and transporting tobacco. Whether Allerton bought land from his neighbor Richard Lee II or acquired it over time is not known. He may have acquired the land from his marriage to Elizabeth, who would have acquired it from her previous marriages or from her parents.

In 1663 Allerton was appointed a justice of then vast Northumberland County (the justices jointly administered the county in addition to judicial duties). In 1667 he was a member of the "Committee of the Association of Northumberland, Westmoreland and Stafford Counties". He joined the local in the Virginia militia and ultimately rose to the rank of colonel. As a major in 1667, he served under Colonel John Washington, the great-grandfather of president George Washington, Settlers in the area had experienced massacres in 1622 and 1644, and when the southern Maryland Doeg sent a raiding party in 1675 that killed three colonists, the initial response was by Col. George Mason and Captain Giles Brent Jr., who destroyed their Virginia settlement (at Dogue Neck, later a plantation of the Mason family) and pursued them across the river and into the Maryland woods. Then Maryland and Virginia colonists raised a force estimated at 1000 men, the Virginians led by Cols. Washington and Allerton and the Marylanders by Major Truman, to attack a fort the Susquehannocks had erected on an island in the Potomac River. The colonists attacked the fort, and five Native Americans who had surrendered were slaughtered by Maryland militia, which led to charges filed against both Washington and Allerton in the General Court at Williamsburg. Although Washington died before the proceedings finished, Allerton was acquitted.

Allerton first served as a member of the House of Burgesses in 1667, representing Westmoreland County during a break in service of his merchant friend Nicholas Spencer. He would then represent either adjoining Northumberland County, or Westmoreland County for all the sessions in which those Northern Neck counties sent representatives for the next fourteen years.

During Bacon's Rebellion in 1676, Allerton remained loyal to governor Berkeley, who was later criticized by a royal commission. Nathaniel Bacon specifically denounced Allerton as one of the governor's cronies. Allerton's family also developed a close relationship with the Lee family, who had vast estates in both counties. Like John Washington, both Allerton and Lee were senior officers and also served as members of the General Court of Virginia (the county's appellate court had sessions during those of the House of Burgesses). Allerton and Lee participated in commerce, governmental affairs and social activities.

Allerton served on the Governor's council from 1687 to 1691, when he, Lee and John Armistead resigned rather than take a loyalty oath to William III and Mary II, who had ousted King James. After a decade-plus break in service, Allerton won his last election to the House of Burgesses in 1696, but wrote that illness prevented him from attending to October 1697 session. Nonetheless, he received an appointment as naval officer and tax collector for Westmoreland county in 1699.

Meanwhile, Allerton was on the committee that in 1680 resolved the complicated widow's claim after the execution of rebel Giles Bland, and that year also was appointed escheator (resolving estates of those dying without issue) for Westmoreland or adjacent Northern Neck counties. In 1688, Allerton joined Captain George Brent of Stafford County, Virginia (who had emigrated from Maryland) and Captain Lawrence Washington as trustees of the estate of their mutual friend, Nicholas Spencer; Col. Spencer also bequeathed each man forty shillings for a mourning ring. to serve as trustees of his estates.

== Death and legacy ==
Isaac Allerton died between October 25, 1702, and December 30, 1702, in Westmoreland County, Virginia.

Lee's younger brother Hancock married Allerton's daughter Sarah after Hancock's first wife died. They became the great-grandparents of President Zachary Taylor, through their daughter Elizabeth Lee and grandson Colonel Richard Taylor, an officer in the Continental Army in the American Revolutionary War. Another great granddaughter was Mary Willis Lee, the daughter of Hancock Lee II and Mary Willis. She married Ambrose Madison, the son of James Madison, Sr., the owner of a tobacco plantation in Orange County, Virginia, and the brother of James Madison, an American politician and political philosopher who served as the fourth President of the United States (1809–1817) and is considered one of the Founding Fathers of the United States.

== Ancestry ==
Ancestors of Isaac Allerton Jr.

William Allerton
William Allerton
Rose Serell
Edward Allerton
John Byrren/Byron
Ales Byrren
Isaac Allerton
Sir Robert Davys
Sir James Rice Davys
Agnes Chandler
Rose Davis
Thomas Chandler
Agnes Chandler
Agnes de Bishops
Isaac Allerton Jr.
William Brewster
William Brewster
Maud/Maude Mann
William Brewster
William/Thomas Smythe (or Smyth)
Mary Smythe (or Smyth or Simkinson)
Agnes Simkinson
Fear Brewster
Mary
