= Isaac Allerton =

Mayflower passenger (1586–1659)

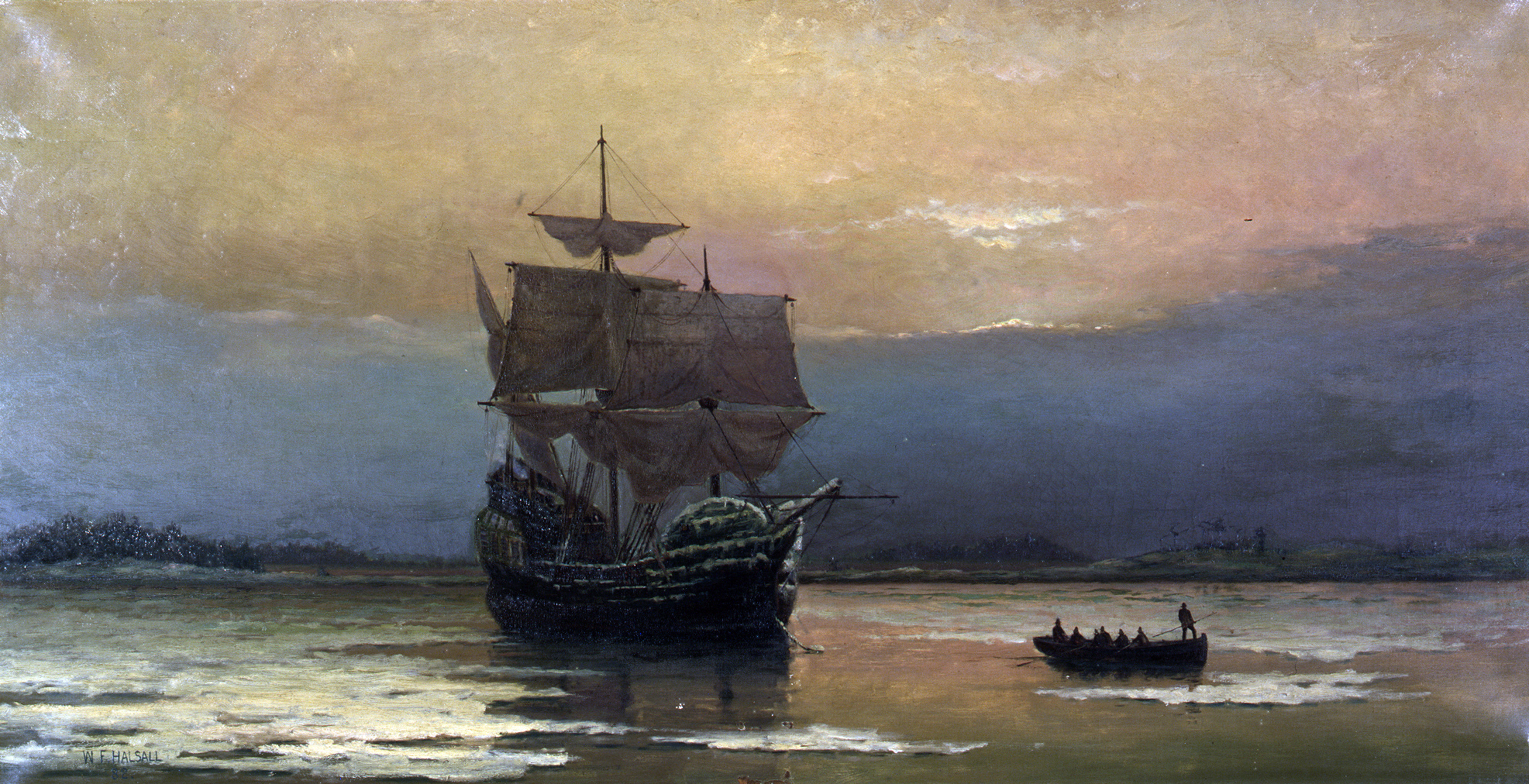
Mayflower in Plymouth Harbor by William Halsall (1882)

Isaac Allerton Sr. (c. 1586 – 1658/9), and his family, were passengers on the historic voyage of the ship Mayflower, in 1620. Allerton was a signatory to the Mayflower Compact. In Plymouth Colony he was active in colony governmental affairs and business and later in trans-Atlantic trading. Problems with the latter regarding colony expenditures caused him to be censured by the colony government and ousted from the colony. He later became a well-to-do businessman elsewhere and in his later years resided in the state of Connecticut.

== English ancestry ==
Coat of Arms of Isaac Allerton

Based on a deposition given in 1639, Allerton was born in Suffolk, England about 1586–88, although clues to his ancestry have long been quite elusive. Some records from colonial Dutch New Amsterdam (New York) note he was from the English county of Suffolk. Allerton's son Bartholomew did return to England from Plymouth and served as a minister in Suffolk which may indicate a connection to that county. In 1659 the will of Bartholomew was proved, and at that time he was residing in Bramfield, co. Suffolk but no other records relating to the Allertons, a quite rare name, have ever been found in Suffolk.

Author and genealogist Leslie Mahler, writing in The Mayflower Quarterly of March 2009, notes that an Isaac Allerton, who appears to be the Mayflower passenger, is mentioned in the 1609 apprenticeship registers for the Blacksmiths Company in London. This record indicates Isaac to have been the son of Bartholomew Allerton, tailor of Ipswich, Suffolk.

The apprentice record as translated from Latin (Isack Allerton fil Bartholomei Allerton..): "21 June 1609, Isaac Allerton, son of Bartholomew Allerton late of Ipswich, county Suffolk, tailor has bound himself apprentice by indenture to James Gly, Citizen and Black Smith of London for seven years from the Feast of the Nativity of St. John the Baptist last."

== Life in Leiden ==
In Leiden in 1611, Allerton stated he was from London, (England).

Also living in Leiden in 1611 was Allerton's sister Sarah (Allerton) Vincent, widow prior to 1611 of John Vincent. Isaac and his wife, Mary, and Sarah and her second husband Degory Priest, had a double wedding in Leiden on November 4, 1611. In the records of the time, Sarah is noted to have been "of London". Also in Leiden at this time was John Allerton, who may well have been a relative of Isaac's or Isaac's brother, but this has never been proven for certain.

Allerton became betrothed to Mary Norris in Leiden by October 7, 1611. He lived in Pieterskerkhof near St. Peter's Church. In 1614 he became a citizen of Leiden. While in Leiden in 1619 Allerton worked as a tailor; John Hooke, who would travel with Allerton on the Mayflower, was his apprentice.

== The Mayflower voyage ==
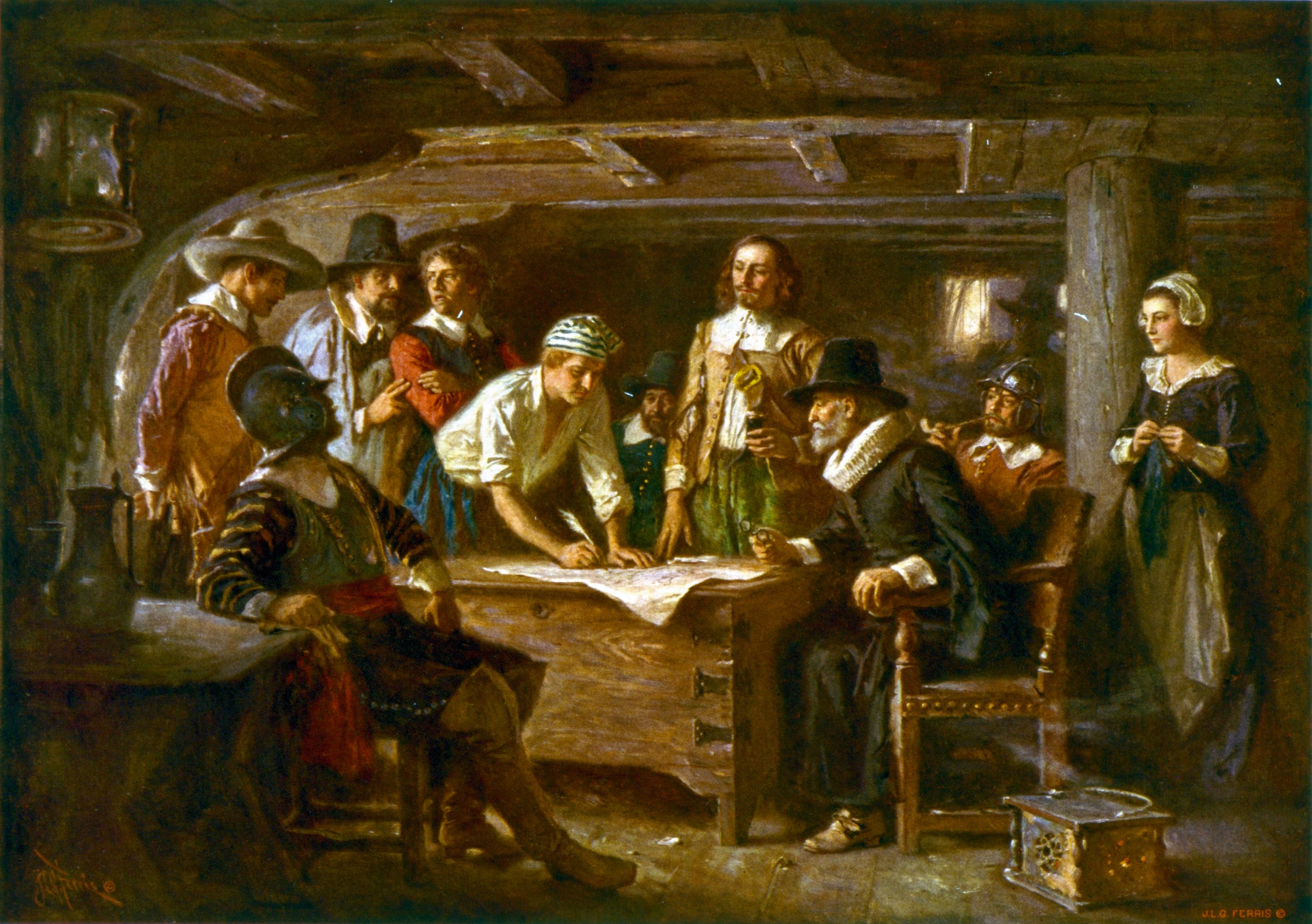
Signing the Mayflower Compact 1620, a painting by Jean Leon Gerome Ferris 1899

The Allerton family boarded the Mayflower consisting of Allerton's wife Mary, three children and an apprentice, John Hooke.

The Mayflower departed Plymouth, England on September 6/16, 1620. The small, 100-foot ship had 102 passengers and a crew of about 30–40 in extremely cramped conditions. By the second month out, the ship was being buffeted by strong westerly gales, causing the ship's timbers to be badly shaken with caulking failing to keep out sea water, and with passengers, even in their berths, lying wet and ill. This, combined with a lack of proper rations and unsanitary conditions for several months, attributed to what would be fatal for many, especially the majority of women and children. On the way there were two deaths, a crew member and a passenger, but the worst was yet to come after arriving at their destination when, in the space of several months, almost half the passengers perished in cold, harsh, unfamiliar New England winter.

On November 9/19, 1620, after about three months at sea, including a month of delays in England, they spotted land, which was the Cape Cod Hook, now called Provincetown Harbor. And after several days of trying to get south to their planned destination of the Colony of Virginia, strong winter seas forced them to return to the harbor at Cape Cod hook, where they anchored on November 11/21. The Mayflower Compact was signed that day. Issac Allerton was one of the signers.

== Life in Plymouth Colony ==
Of Isaac Allerton and his first wife, William Bradford recorded: "Mr. Allerton's wife died with the first, and his servant John Hooke. His son Bartle is married in England but I know not how many children he hath. His daughter Remember is married at Salem and hath three or four children living. His daughter Mary is married here and hath four children. Himself married again with the daughter of Mr. Brewster and hath one son living by her, but she is long since dead. And he is married again and hath left this place long ago."

The colony government chose John Carver as their first governor. Allerton was his assistant from 1621 to 1624, and afterwards serving on the colony civil affairs council. After the early death of John Carver in April 1621, William Bradford was elected governor in Carver's place.

In 1626 Allerton became involved in the colony's finances. With the dissolving of the Merchant Adventurers there was a great need for the colonist to pay their debts. William Bradford, Allerton and others took on the colony's debt to the Merchant Adventurers with the provision that they be given a monopoly in the fur trade.

Isaac Allerton traveled to London in 1626 to negotiate a new agreement with the Merchant Adventurers group which had given much money for the trip and the maintenance of the colony.

In the 1627 division of cattle (equal to a census) the Allerton family is listed with wife Fear and children Bartholomew, Remember, Mary and Sarah.

About 1628 a young man came to work as an apprentice under Allerton. This was Mayflower passenger Richard More, who then was about age 15 then and a world away from his parents in England. Richard had been part of a historic incident in which he and three siblings were placed aboard the Mayflower in 1620 by their putative father, Samuel More, without their mother's knowledge, after her admission of adultery. All three of Richard's siblings perished the first winter in America, and he alone survived. Richard worked under Allerton for the usual seven years, during which time he learned to be a sailor, working largely in the fishing and coastal cargo-transport business, and in Allerton's business development in Maine. By 1635, Richard was back in London, but the reason for the trip is unknown. His name appears on the manifest of the Blessing in 1635. Later, More was an Atlantic ship captain.

Allerton returned from England in 1628. He made a payment to the Merchant Adventurers investment group thus reducing the colony's debt to them. The debt was still a tremendous amount of money estimated into the thousands of pounds. He had obtained a land grant at Kennebec (in present-day Maine), provided by the Council for New England. The Kennebec grant was officially authorized in January 1629, and the Plymouth colonists began to build a fortified trading structure at Cushnoc on the Kennebec River, with Edward Winslow as overseer in charge of the operation.

Allerton was not dealing honestly with the colony and was mixing their money with his from the proceeds of the furs and other goods. And as a result of Allerton's mismanagement and Bradford's lack of business skill, the colony's debts were not only not being paid off but, in fact, increased. Also, Allerton started his own trading post at Kennebec at the same time as the colony was trading there and became a competitor. As a result, it took many years for the colony to repay its debt to the merchant adventurers and they only did so by selling off some of their land.

Allerton also brought some unscrupulous persons from England to the colony. One was John Lyford, intended as a pastor for the Plymouth church and another was Thomas Morton, his clerk. Morton was eventually deported twice for his transgressions but came back because William Brewster was his father-in-law. This pattern of incompetence continued when, upon his return in 1630, it was revealed that Allerton had also failed to bring much needed supplies.

Plymouth had built a trading posts at Pentagoet and in 1630 Allerton built his own trading post there (near Castine) putting Edward Ashley in charge. This man was also disreputable and eventually replaced with another agent in mid-1631 after a Pentagoet local gave a disposition in Plymouth. Although Allerton had begun honestly handling the colony's business dealing he wound up enriching himself greatly at the colony's expense and was finally removed from his position.

In September 1631 Allerton moved from Plymouth and settled at Marblehead Neck between Marblehead Harbor and Massachusetts Bay.

Under the year 1631 in colony records William Bradford wrote "Mr. Allerton doth wholly desert them (the people of Plymouth Colony) having brought them into the briars, he leaves them to get out as they can … and sets up a trading house behind Penobscot to cut off trade from there also."

By 1633 Allerton had set up yet another trading post in Machias, but lost it with the Treaty of Saint-German-en-Laye of 1632, when England ceded most of the Maine coast to France. Charles La Tour arrived, killing some of Allerton's men and bringing goods and also prisoners to Port Royal to be ransomed.

In 1634, more misfortune came to the colony with disease killing many people, among them were Allerton's wife Fear, daughter of William Brewster, as well as her sister Patience, wife of Thomas Prence, who would later be governor of the Plymouth Colony.

== New Amsterdam and New Haven ==
Allerton was finally banished, along with some of his unscrupulous friends from Massachusetts Bay. He then moved to the New Haven Colony. One of Allerton's contacts in London was William Vassall, who had come to Massachusetts in 1630 but shortly returned to England to fight for the rights of those who had not joined the church in Massachusetts. In mid-1635 Vassall returned to Massachusetts with his family on the ship Blessing. Vassall's daughter Judith married Resolved White who was William's eldest son. In 1640 Vassall proposed to Allerton to go to a Caribbean island in which he had an investment in sugar cane.

By the 1640s, Allerton had simultaneous residences in New Haven and in New Amsterdam, the capital of the Dutch colony of New Netherland (which has become Lower Manhattan in New York City), where he owned property and became influential. He was appointed to the Eight Men, an early citizens advisory board in 1643 by then Director of New Netherland Willem Kieft.

By 1646 Allerton lived in New Haven. He died in February 1658/9.

== Marriages ==
Isaac Allerton was married three times:

1. Mary Norris of Newbury, England. They married in Leiden, Holland November 4, 1611. She died in Plymouth February 25, 1620/1.
2. Fear Brewster in Plymouth Colony ca. 1625/26. She died in Plymouth before December 12, 1634. She was a daughter of William and Mary Brewster.
3. Joanna Swinnerton, probably in New Haven CT before February 17, 1644/5. She was still living in New Haven as of May 19, 1684.

== Children ==
From Mary Norris:

- Bartholomew Allerton. Born Leiden, Holland ca. 1612/13. He moved back to England, marrying (1) Margaret __ and (2) Sarah Fairfax. He had at least four children and died at Bramfield, Suffolk in 1658.
- Remember Allerton. Born Leiden ca. 1614/15. She married Moses Maverick before May 6, 1635, and had seven children. She died in Marblehead between September 12, 1652, and October 22, 1656.
- Mary Allerton. Born Leiden ca. 1616/17. She married Thomas Cushman in Plymouth about 1636 and had eight children. She died, the last of the Mayflower passengers, on November 28, 1699.
- (child) buried at St. Pancras/St. Peters, Leiden February 5, 1620.
- (son) was stillborn aboard Mayflower at Plymouth Harbor December 22, 1620.

From Fear Brewster:

- Sarah Allerton. Born Plymouth ca. 1626/27. Died before 1651.
- Col. Isaac Allerton Jr. Born Plymouth between May 22, 1627 and 1630. He graduated from Harvard in 1650. He married (1) Elizabeth ____ about 1652 and had two children. She died after June 11, 1655. He married (2) Elizabeth (Willoughby) (Oversee) Colclough about 1663 and had three children. He died in Westmoreland County, Virginia about 1702.

He had 21 grandchildren total.

== Burial and will ==
Isaac Allerton died in February 1658/9 between the 1st (appeared in court) and 12th (date of inventory). He was buried in February. His first wife Mary is believed to have been buried in an unmarked grave, as with many who died the first winter, in Coles Hill Burial Ground, Plymouth, possibly early in 1621. She is named on the Pilgrim Memorial Tomb on Coles Hill as "Mary, first wife of Isaac Allerton."

The inventory of Isaac Allerton, late of Newhaven, taken 12 Feb. 1658/9 was presented in the New Haven court 5 April 1659, his son Isaac being away at the time. Isaac produced his father's will on 5 July 1659 and was appointed to settle the estate, but he relinquished the trust. The will is little more than memoranda of debts due him and owned by him, but names his wife and son Isaac Allerton as trustees and they were to receive "what is overpluss." It mentions "brother Breuster."

== Assistant on Pearl Street in New Amsterdam – George "Joris" Woolsey ==
George "Joris" Woolsey, the progenitor of the Woolsey family in North America, was in the employ of Allerton at his shop on Pearl Street in Manhattan.

== Servant in the company of the Isaac Allerton family on the Mayflower ==
John Hooke was about thirteen years old and an apprentice/servant to Isaac Allerton. He was born about 1607 in Norwich, Co. Norfolk to John and Alice (Thompson) Hooke who were married on August 9, 1605 at St Peter Mancroft in Norwich. The Hooke family later moved to Leiden in Holland as members of the Separatist Church.

On January 8, 1619 John was apprenticed to Isaac Allerton who was at the time a Leiden tailor. The apprenticeship was to last for twelve years. On the Mayflower, Bradford referred to him as "a servant boy, John Hooke."

Isaac Allerton's wife Mary and their servant John Hooke both died the first winter in Plymouth.

== Sources ==
- The Mayflower Society
