= Fear Brewster =

American settler (circa 1606–1634)

Fear Allerton
- Born: Fear Brewster c. 1606; Scrooby, Nottinghamshire, England
- Died: c. 1634 probably Massachusetts
- Known for: Early American Settler
- Spouse: Isaac Allerton
- Children: Isaac Allerton Jr., Sarah Allerton
- Parent(s): William Brewster, Mary Brewster
- Relatives: Richard Taylor, Zachary Taylor (descendants)

Fear Allerton (née Brewster; c. 1606 - before December 12, 1634) was a woman in Colonial America. She was the third daughter of Mayflower Pilgrim William Brewster and his wife Mary Brewster, born in Scrooby, Nottinghamshire, England. Her early years, and indeed her whole life, were full of unrest. In 1608 she moved, along with the other pilgrims, to Amsterdam (and later Leiden).

Fear was only 14 when her parents and two younger brothers, Love and Wrestling, left for America on the Mayflower. She was left in the care of her older siblings, Jonathan (born in 1593) and Patience (born in 1600). Jonathan joined the pilgrims in 1621 on board the Fortune. Fear arrived in America with Patience in 1623.

Fear married Isaac Allerton, another Mayflower pilgrim, around 1623 or 1627. He was 20 years her senior. They had a daughter, Sarah, born about 1627. Sarah probably died young. They also had a son, Isaac Allerton Jr., a colonial merchant and colonel, born between 1627 and 1630. Richard Taylor, a direct descendant of Isaac Jr., was the father of the 12th President of the United States, Zachary Taylor.

Fear died young, but the exact date is unknown. On December 12, 1634, Governor John Winthrop reported to his son that both Fear and her sister Patience Brewster Prence had died, writing a "pestilent fever hath taken away some at Plimouth, amonge others Mr. Prence the Governor his wife and Mr. Allerton's wife."
