= Humphrey Norton =

English quaker

Humphrey Norton was an English quaker, and one of the earliest members of the Society of Friends.

== Early career ==
Norton was one of the earliest members of the Society of Friends. From September 1655 to May 1656 Norton was living in London, acting as the society's accredited agent for the assistance of friends travelling about and preaching. In March 1654–5 he was imprisoned at Durham.

He went to Ireland in June 1656, and preached in Leinster, Munster, and Connaught. In Galway he was taken violently from a meeting by a guard of soldiers, and driven from the city. At Wexford he was again seized while conducting a peaceable meeting, and committed to gaol until the next assizes. Here he wrote his treatise To all People that speakes of an outward Baptisme, Dippers, Sprinklers, and others. Also the Errors answered holden forth by Thomas Larkham … at Wexford he was then, &c. George Keith says that he saw in manuscript many papers which Norton had dispersed against baptism.

== Journey to New England ==
Early in 1657 he returned from Ireland, and on 1 June embarked with ten other Friends for Boston, from where six of them had been expelled the previous year. They sailed in the Woodhouse, owned and commanded by Robert Fowler, a quaker of Bridlington Quay, Yorkshire, who wrote A True Relation of the Voyage. Norton landed about 12 August 1657 at Rhode Island, and at once proceeded to the Plymouth Colony. He was arrested on a vague charge of being an extravagant person, "guilty of divers horred errors", and detained some time without examination. Upon presenting a paper setting forth his purpose in coming, and requiring that he be "quickly punished or cleared", he was brought before the magistrates, and the governor, Thomas Prence, commenced an attack on what he alleged to be quaker doctrines, which Norton answered. Unable to convict him of any breach of the law, the court on 6 October 1657 sentenced him to banishment, and he was conveyed by the under-marshal fifty miles towards Rhode Island.

Towards the close of the year he passed over to Long Island, and, arriving in February at Southold, he was arrested and taken to New Haven, Connecticut, where he was imprisoned for twenty-one days, heavily ironed, and denied fire or candle. On 10 March 1658 he was brought before the court at New Haven and examined. John Davenport, minister of the puritan church there, undertook to prove him guilty of heresy. On his attempting to reply, a large iron key was bound over his mouth. The trial lasted two days. Norton was then recommitted, and, after ten days, was sentenced to be whipped, branded with the letter H (for heretic) in his right hand, fined £10, and banished from New Haven.

Norton then returned to Rhode Island, where the local authorities wisely considered that the quakers, if let alone, would not prove so aggressive. After some weeks, however, Norton returned with John Rous to Plymouth, to attend the Plymouth General Court and protest against the intolerant treatment of their sect. On arriving there on 1 June 1658 they were arrested and imprisoned. Two days later they were brought up before the magistrates and questioned as to their motive in coming. Both were recommitted to prison. Two days after they were again brought up and charged with heresy by Christopher Winter, a constable and surveyor, but a public disputation was denied. The magistrates, failing to convict of heresy, decided to tender the oath of fidelity to the state. On their refusal to "take any oath at all", they were ordered to be flogged, Norton with twenty-three lashes. The flogging ended, they were liberated on 10 June.

About the end of June 1658 Norton and Rous went to Boston, and were warned to depart at once. Instead, they attended the weekly lecture of John Norton, who uttered strong invectives against their sect. On Humphrey Norton attempting to reply at the close, he was haled before the magistrates, imprisoned three days, whipped, and returned to prison. On 16 July he wrote a letter to Governor John Endecott and John Norton. A fresh order that quakers in prison should be regularly flogged twice a week was put in force from 18 July; but the public of Boston were growing disgusted with the cruelties practised in the name of religion, and they made a public subscription to pay the prison fees and forward the prisoners to Providence, Rhode Island.

== After leaving New England ==
Norton appears to have gone to Barbados about January or February 1659.

While on a voyage to England in April the same year he wrote New England's Ensigne. … This being an Account of the Sufferings sustained by us in New England (with the Dutch), the most part of it in these two last years, 1657, 1658. With a Letter to John Indicot, and John Norton, Governor and Chief Priest of Boston; and another to the town of Boston. Also the several late Conditions of a Friend upon Road-Iland, before, in, and after Distraction; with some Quæries unto all sorts of People who want that which we have, &c. Written at Sea, by us whom the Wicked in Scorn calls Quakers, in the second month of the yeer 1659 (London, 1659). He also took part in writing The Secret Workes of a cruel People made manifest, &c. (London, 1659), and Woe unto them are mighty to drink wine (undated).

The time of his death is uncertain.

== Attribution ==
- This article incorporates text from a publication now in the public domain: "Norton, Humphrey". Dictionary of National Biography. London: Smith, Elder & Co. 1885–1900.
