= Love Brewster =

Early English colonist in North America

- Born: Love Brewster abt 1611; Leiden, Dutch Republic
- Died: bef 31 January 1650/1; Duxbury, Plymouth Colony
- Occupation: about the age of 10 yrs old he volunteered for the militia under Myles Standish an English Guard to protect the Colony.
- Spouse: Sarah Collier
- Children: Sarah Brewster; Nathaniel Brewster; William Brewster; Wrestling Brewster
- Parent(s): William Brewster; Mary Brewster

Love Brewster (c. 1611 – c. 1650) was an early American settler, the son of Elder William Brewster and his wife, Mary Brewster. He traveled with his father, mother and brother, Wrestling, on the Mayflower reaching what became the Plymouth Colony in Massachusetts in 1620. Brewster had two sisters, Patience and Fear, and two brothers, Jonathan and Wrestling, along with an unnamed sister who died young. He was a founder of the town of Bridgewater, Plymouth County, Massachusetts.

== Biography ==
=== Early life ===
Coat of arms of William Brewster

Love Brewster was born at Leiden, Holland, circa 1611, although no birth records have been found, and died at Duxbury, Massachusetts, sometime between October 6, 1650, and the "last day" of January 1651. This latter date is based on the date of his will and when the inventory of his estate was taken. He was the son of Elder William Brewster, (ca. 1567 – April 10, 1644), the Pilgrim colonist leader and spiritual elder of the Plymouth Colony and his wife, Mary. At the age of nine, he traveled with his father, mother and brother, Wrestling, on the Mayflower to Plymouth, Massachusetts.

=== Marriage ===
He married Sarah Collier at Plymouth, Massachusetts, on May 15, 1634. Sarah was baptized on April 30, 1616, at St Olave's Church, in the parish of Southwark St Olave, an area of south-east London in the London Borough of Southwark, England, and died on April 26, 1691, at Duxbury, Massachusetts. She was a daughter of Jane Clark and William Collier, one of the investors, or Merchant Adventurers, and an initial shareholder in the Plymouth Colony. She was the sister of Mary Collier, the wife of Thomas Prence, a co-founder of Eastham, Massachusetts, a political leader in both the Plymouth and Massachusetts Bay colonies, and governor of Plymouth (1634, 1638, and 1657–73). Thomas' first wife, Patience Brewster, was a sister of Love's. Sarah, Love's widow, married sometime after September 1, 1656, Richard Parke of Cambridge, Massachusetts, and he died there in 1665. He also gave her a life's interest in his estate, which was later sold to Thomas Parke in 1678.

=== Career ===
He was admitted a Freeman of the Colony on March 2, 1635/1636, which granted him the right to own land and to vote. Love and Sarah settled in Duxbury, Plymouth County, Massachusetts, around 1636/7 next door to his father. Love was a successful farmer through his adult life. He served in the Pequot War as a volunteer in 1637, and was a member of Captain Myles Standish's Duxbury Company in 1643. He served on the grand jury from Duxbury in 1648 and was one of the founders of Bridgewater, Massachusetts, although it is believed that he never lived there.

=== Death ===
He died about January 1650/1 in Duxbury, Massachusetts. Governor William Bradford reported that "Love lived till this year 1650 and dyed, & left 4 children, now living". He was probably buried in Duxbury, but his place of burial is unknown.

=== Children ===
Love Brewster and Sarah Collier had four children:

- Sarah, born ca. 1635
- Nathaniel, called "eldest son," born ca. 1637
- William, born ca. 1645, died in Duxbury, Massachusetts, on 3 November 1723), married (Duxbury, Massachusetts, 2 January 1672) Lydia Partridge (died 2 February 1742); eight children: 1) Sarah (born Duxbury, Massachusetts, 25 April 1674), 2) Nathaniel Brewster (born Duxbury, Massachusetts, 8 November 1676), 3) Lydia (born Duxbury, Massachusetts, 11 February 1680), 4) William Brewster (born Duxbury, Massachusetts, 4 May 1683), 5) Mercy (born Duxbury, Massachusetts, 7 December 1685), 6) Benjamin (born Duxbury, Massachusetts, 7 July 1688), 7) Joseph (born Duxbury, Massachusetts, 17 March 1693), 8) Joshua (born Duxbury, Massachusetts, c. 1698)
- Wrestling, died 1 January 1696/7, married Mary; eight children: 1) Mary (born 10 February 1678/9), 2) Sarah, 3) Abigail, 4) Jonathan, 5) Hannah, 6) Elizabeth, 7) Wrestling (born 4 August 1695), 8) John

=== Descendants ===
Love and Sarah's descendants number in the thousands today. Some of their notable descendants include:

- Ralph Brewster Allison, M.D. (b. 1931), an American psychiatrist and a pioneer in Dissociative identity disorder (DID)
- Roger Nash Baldwin (b. 1884), one of the founders of the American Civil Liberties Union (ACLU)
- John Bartlett (b. 1820), an American writer and publisher whose best-known work was Bartlett's Familiar Quotations
- Gamaliel Bradford (b. 1863), an American biographer, critic, poet, and dramatist
- Benjamin Brewster (b. 1860), Episcopal Bishop of Maine and Missionary Bishop of Western Colorado
- Benjamin Brewster (b. 1828), an American industrialist, financier, and one of the original trustees of Standard Oil
- Dr. Chauncey Bunce Brewster (b. 1848), the fifth American Episcopal bishop of the Episcopal Diocese of Connecticut
- David Brewster (b. 1939), American journalist.
- Diane Brewster (b. 1931), an American television actress
- John Brewster Jr. (b. 1766), a prolific, deaf, itinerant painter who produced many charming portraits of much of Maine's elite society of his time, especially their children
- Oliver Brewster (b. 1708), who was married to Martha Wadsworth Brewster, a notable 18th-century American poet and writer. She is one of only four colonial women who published volumes of their verse before the American Revolution and was the first American-born woman to publish under her own name.
- Ralph Owen Brewster (b. 1888), American politician from Maine; Republican U.S. Senator from Maine from 1941 until 1952
- Alfred Ely (b. 1815), U.S. Representative from New York
- William F. Halsey, Admiral, U.S. Navy, in World War II.
- Doris Humphrey, dancer and choreographer
- Brewster Jennings (1898–1968), a founder and president of the Socony-Vacuum Oil Company, which in 1955 became the Standard Oil Company of New York (Socony), later becoming the Mobil Corporation.
- George Trumbull Ladd (b. 1842), an American philosopher and psychologist
- Henry Wadsworth Longfellow (b. 1807), American educator and poet
- Archibald MacLeish (b. 1892), American poet, writer and Librarian of Congress. He is associated with the Modernist school of poetry. He received three Pulitzer Prizes for his work.
- Lieutenant Kenneth MacLeish (b. 1894), Naval aviator during World War I. He received the Navy Cross.
- Admiral Samuel Eliot Morison (b. 1887), Pulitzer Prize-winning historian
- Gaylord Brewster Noyce (b. 1926), one of the first Freedom Riders; arrested for trying to integrate the bus station lunch counter in Montgomery, Alabama
- Robert Noyce (b. 1927), nicknamed "the Mayor of Silicon Valley"; inventor of the integrated circuit or microchip
- Henry Farnham Perkins (b. 1877), American zoologist and eugenicist
- Thomas Ruggles Pynchon Jr. (b. 1937), an American novelist based in New York City and noted for his dense and complex works of fiction. His best known novels are: V. (1963), The Crying of Lot 49 (1966), Gravity's Rainbow (1973), and Mason & Dixon (1997)
- Matthew Laflin Rockwell (b. 1915), American architect, responsible for the site selection, plan and design of O'Hare International Airport
