= Thomas Prence =

American colonist and politician (1601–1673)

Thomas Prence (or, Thomas Prince）

4th, 8th, & 12th Governor of Plymouth Colony
- In office 1634–1635
- Preceded by: Edward Winslow
- Succeeded by: William Bradford
- In office 1638–1639
- Preceded by: William Bradford
- Succeeded by: William Bradford
- In office 1657–1673
- Preceded by: William Bradford
- Succeeded by: Josiah Winslow

Member of the Plymouth Council of Assistants
- In office 1635–1638
- In office 1639–1657

Commissioner for Plymouth Colony
- In office 1645–1645
- In office 1649–1649 Serving with William Bradford
- In office 1652–1654
- In office 1656–1658 Serving with William Bradford; James Cudworth; John Endecott; Josiah Winslow
- In office 1661–1663 Serving with Thomas Southworth; Josiah Winslow
- In office 1668–1672 Serving with Thomas Hinckley; Thomas Southworth; Josiah Winslow

Personal details
- Born: c. 1600 Lechlade, Gloucestershire, England
- Died: March 29, 1673 Plymouth, Plymouth Colony

Thomas Prence (c. 1601 – March 29, 1673) was a New England colonist who arrived in the colony of Plymouth in November 1621 on the ship Fortune. In 1644 he moved to Eastham, which he helped found, returning later to Plymouth. For many years, he was prominent in Plymouth colony affairs and was colony governor for about twenty years, covering three terms.

== In England ==
Thomas Prence was probably born in the area of Lechlade, a town in Gloucestershire, in about 1600 to Thomas Prince and Elizabeth Tolderby. The Prince family moved to the London parish of All Hallows Barking, near Tower Hill, where Thomas' father was a carriage maker. Prence's father, in his will of July 31, 1639, mentioned "my son Thomas Prence now remayninge in New England in parts beyond the seas", and bequeathed him a "seale Ringe of Gold", indicating the family may have been armigerous. Prence's ancestors spelled the family name "Prince", but, after his emigration, Thomas used the spelling of "Prence".

Prence lived in Ratcliff, at that time a hamlet in the parish of Stepney, which is where he was probably living when he decided to emigrate to the New World.

== In New England ==
Thomas Prence came to Plymouth Colony on the ship Fortune in November 1621 as a single man. In the 1623 division of land, Prence is named as "holder of one akre of land".

The Plymouth Colony had been founded as a joint venture between separatists, religious separatists and a group of "merchant adventurers", who underwrote much of the cost of the colony's establishment in exchange for a share of its profit-making activities. By 1626, however, it was clear that the colony was unlikely to yield significant profits, and the merchant adventurers sought to divest themselves of their obligations. Prence was one of eight leaders of the colony (known collectively as the "Undertakers") who agreed to assume all of the colony's debts to the merchants, in exchange for which the other colonists granted them a monopoly on the local fur trade. In a 1633 tax assessment, Prence's wealth was such that he was one of a few men required to pay more than £1.

The Undertakers established several trading posts around New England, where they traded with the natives for furs, which were shipped to England to pay off their debts. The business was risky for a variety of reasons: there was competition from Dutch and French traders (the latter seizing the Plymouth post at Pentagoet, present-day Castine, Maine), and their first shipment to England was taken by French privateers. The group's agent, Isaac Allerton, also casually mixed personal business with the group's, apparently to his advantage. As a result, debts to English merchants continued to mount until the late 1630s, when Allerton deserted them and the Undertakers sought to dissolve their agreement with the London merchants. An agreement was reached in 1641 to pay the London merchants £1,200 over a several-year period, but one of the merchants refused the deal and insisted on being paid an additional £400. To rid themselves of the problem, the Undertakers in 1645 pledged some of their landholdings as security. A few years later, they were forced to sell some land to satisfy the pledge; Prence sold his house to pay his share.

The economy of the colony changed after major migration to the new Massachusetts Bay Colony began in 1630. The Puritans arriving at Boston and other new communities to the north created a demand for Plymouth's agricultural output, which had until then been primarily used for local consumption. Because the land at Plymouth was not particularly good, its colonists began to disperse to other places where land was better. Prence was part of this migration, joining his father-in-law William Brewster in moving to nearby Duxbury in 1632.

In 1644, the Prence family was one of seven to found a new settlement at Eastham on Cape Cod. The area of the Outer Cape (roughly from Brewster to Provincetown) had been reserved to the Undertakers, and Prence became one of the largest landowners in the area. His holdings included land in what is now Brewster, Harwich, Wellfleet and all of Truro. The land there was fertile and the town prospered under his guidance. Prence lived there until 1663 when he moved back to Plymouth.

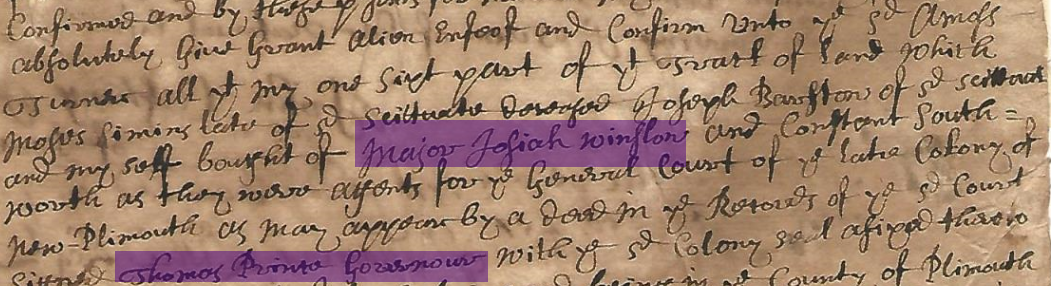
An early Plymouth deed mentioning Governor Thomas Prence and Josiah Winslow, courtesy of Shiwei Jiang

== Colonial leadership ==
Governors of Plymouth Colony
Dates	Governor
1620	John Carver
1621–1632	William Bradford
1633	Edward Winslow
1634	Thomas Prence
1635	William Bradford
1636	Edward Winslow
1637	William Bradford
1638	Thomas Prence
1639–1643	William Bradford
1644	Edward Winslow
1645–1656	William Bradford
1657–1672	Thomas Prence
1673–1679	Josiah Winslow
1680–1692	Thomas Hinckley

In 1634, Prence was elected governor, and for the rest of his life he played a role in the colony's governance, serving as either governor or on the council of assistants. He also served, at various times, as colonial treasurer, president of the Council of War, and in a variety of other positions. His first election came after the longtime former governor William Bradford refused to stand for the office, and the outgoing governor, Edward Winslow, was preparing to travel to England. Prence was re-elected in 1638 after Bradford again refused to run.

Prence was involved in the colony's disputes over control of settlements on the Connecticut River. As part of the colony's fur trading operations, a trading post was established at Matianuck, now Windsor, Connecticut, in the early 1630s. This was done over objections by the Dutch of New Netherland, who had established their own trading post at present-day Hartford not long before. Discontented colonists from the neighboring Massachusetts Bay Colony settled in the same area 1634, seeking to escape what they perceived as the harsh rule of "King [John] Winthrop". Although Jonathan Brewster, head of the Matianuck post, gave some assistance to the needy Massachusetts colonists, the Plymouth government protested that the settlers were occupying land that they had rightly acquired from the local natives. The matter was also bound to a conflict between the two English provinces over the Maine fur trade and became further complicated by the outbreak of the Pequot War. Prence negotiated the agreement that in 1637 resolved the dispute: most of the land was purchased by the Massachusetts arrivals, and Plymouth retained the trading post and several smaller plots of land. Prence was also involved in an unsuccessful attempt to gain Massachusetts assistance in the recovery of the Pentagoet trading post in Maine.

Prence was elected governor for the second time in 1638. New England was then dealing with the aftereffects of the Antinomian Controversy, a religious dispute that resulted in the banishment of several people (notably Anne Hutchinson and John Wheelwright) from the neighboring Massachusetts Bay Colony, and occasioned significant debate in Plymouth as well. Prence's hardline Puritan views on the matter may have played a role in his election that year. Another persona non grata in Massachusetts was Samuel Gorton, who arrived in Boston, and not finding its religious practices to his liking, settled in Plymouth. Prence objected to Gorton's religious practices as well and saw to it that he was banished from Plymouth. The charges he used to achieve this stemmed from a violation by Gorton of law against harboring strangers without permission, which had until then been only weakly enforced. Prence's action was unpopular, but those protesting Gorton's conviction were themselves fined by the magistrates.

During his 1638 term, Prence presided over a significant criminal case over the murder of a Native American man named Penowanyanquis. The matter involved all of the neighboring jurisdictions, because the Indian, a Nipmuc who was trading for the Narragansett, was attacked on the path between Plymouth and the tribal lands, and the perpetrators were captured by the Narragansett. Their leaders appealed for justice to Rhode Island leader Roger Williams, and the victim also survived long enough to make a statement to the Rhode Islanders. Massachusetts Bay authorities were also notified but recommended the case be sent to Plymouth since the attack took place on Plymouth territory. Four white men were involved in the attack, but one managed to escape before the trial and was never recaptured. The other three were tried, convicted, and hanged. Those Narragansetts who attended the trial were satisfied that justice was served.

On the 1643 Able to Bear Arms List, Mr. Thomas Prence is listed with those men of Plymouth.

In 1645, a petition was presented to the colonial council asking for religious tolerance. It was the work of William Vassall, who was also supposedly behind a similar petition that was introduced in 1646 in Massachusetts. The petition had broad support within the colony, but was opposed by the conservative leadership, including Prence, Governor Bradford, and Edward Winslow. The colonial assembly would have approved the petition, except those three, used parliamentary maneuvers to prevent its consideration.

== United Colonies ==
Plymouth was a member of the United Colonies of New England, an organization formed in 1643 to facilitate the common defense of most of the English colonies of New England (non-Puritan Rhode Island was not invited to join but joined later).

Prence was sometimes one of the commissioners who represented Plymouth in the organization's meetings. As commissioner of the United Colonies, Prence helped negotiate boundaries between Connecticut and New Netherland in the 1650 Treaty of Hartford. Dutch claims to the Connecticut River were coming under increasing pressure from the rapid growth of the English colonies, and both sides sought to avoid military conflict on the matter. Meeting at Hartford, the commission and Dutch Governor-General Peter Stuyvesant negotiated a formal boundary line that essentially confirmed, to English benefit, English claims to what is now the state of Connecticut as well as eastern Long Island.

In 1658, Prence was appointed to a special commission to mediate a border dispute between Massachusetts and Connecticut. The matter concerned Massachusetts territory in what is now Stonington, Connecticut, that it had taken as part of the spoils of the Pequot War. The commission decided that the boundary should be on the Mystic River, with Connecticut to the west and Massachusetts to the east.

== Plymouth Governor ==
After Governor Bradford died in 1657, Prence became the most important person in Plymouth, winning unanimous election to succeed Bradford as governor. He held the post until his death in 1673. He was described as being fairly friendly in informal situations, but when he presided over the colonial court he was strict and authoritarian. He was described by a contemporary as the "Terrour to evill doers", and he was quick to consider his opposition in any matter as "evill".

=== Quaker relations ===
In 1656, not long before Prence became governor, Quakers began to arrive in New England in substantial numbers. The conservative leaders of the Puritan colonies were alarmed by what they saw as their heretical religious views. Massachusetts issued a call to the United Colonies for concerted action against them, and would ultimately take the hardest line against them, hanging four of them for repeated violations of banishment.

The matter of the Quakers came before Plymouth's general court shortly after Prence took office in 1657, and in June that year it passed a series of laws designed to punish or drive them out. Since they refused to swear oaths, one law called for a £5 fine or whipping for anyone refusing to take an oath of allegiance to the King. Ships bringing Quakers into the colony would be charged 20 shillings per day as long as the offensive individuals remained, and voting was restricted to exclude them. They were subject to banishment, and punishments for repeated violations of a ban were escalated. Individuals seen to be harboring them in their homes were also subject to fines and other penalties. Plymouth, like Massachusetts, eventually passed a death penalty for returning Quakers, but it was never applied. Plymouth was neither the harshest of the Puritan colonies in its treatment of the Quakers nor was it the most lenient. Although Prence is often characterized as being less tolerant than Governor Bradford, Bradford never had to face a threat of the sort presented by the Quakers. Historian Eugene Aubrey Stratton believes Bradford might well have approved of the measures taken by Prence.

The measures enacted in Plymouth were generally ineffective at keeping the Quakers out, and there was some backlash against the magistrates. Humphrey Norton, arrested for returning after banishment, took Prence to task during his trial, calling him "a malicious man" and saying, "Thou art like a scolding woman, and thy clamorous tongue I regard no more than the dust under my feet." James Cudworth, a Scituate resident and United Colonies commissioner, refused to sign a letter of protest addressed to Rhode Island (which tolerated the Quaker presence), and became an outspoken opponent of the harsh policies. He was eventually stripped of his offices and disenfranchised.

The backlash against Prence's Quaker policy was quite widespread in some communities, notably in Barnstable and Duxbury. In some towns the problem was so extensive that the colony established a special constable to investigate conditions and make Quaker-related arrests in resistant towns.

About December 22, 1657, Mr. William Collier and Capt. Josiah Winslow sent a constable to a Quaker meeting at Arthur Howland's house in Marshfield to arrest the leader. But as Philips reported, he could not arrest Huchin as he was being hindered by Howland who protected the leader. His direct quote, according to author Eugene Stratton, was that "hee would rather have either a sword or gun in the belly of him." Ironically, despite Prence's dislike for the Quakers, within ten years, Arthur Howland married Thomas Prence's daughter Elizabeth.

By 1660 the colony reached a sort of accommodation with the Quakers in its midst, and most punishments ceased by 1661. Their presence was tolerated as long as they did not disrupt religious services, and they were denied any possibility of voting or other participation in civic affairs. It also required all community members to pay taxes that supported the local (Puritan) church.

=== Other events ===
In 1661 Prence presided over the court during Plymouth's first witchcraft trial and it was reported that he handled the situation in a reasonable way.

In 1665, in payment for having Governor Prence, in his official capacity, reside in Plymouth, the court ordered that he be paid £50 during his term as governor, with a house provided for him in Plymouth's Plain Dealing area. In 1668, at his request, the court sold that house to him for £150.

On April 2, 1667, the Council of War assembled at Plymouth to prepare for a possible war with the Dutch and French. The Council consisted of Governor Prence, John Alden, Major Josiah Winslow, Captains Thomas Southworth, and William Bradford (son of the late governor), and other prominent persons. It was decided that every military commissioned officer should have a formal commission with a draft of commissions to all officer ranks. Towns were ordered to maintain a military watch with the alarm given by firing three muskets. Arms and ammunition were to be checked to be of a state of readiness and with plans made to evacuate women and children. Although it was stated that the Dutch and French were the common enemies, the Indian situation was also in mind, with King Philip's War coming in 1675.

Prence was fair and humane in his dealings with the Indians. Missionary Thomas Mayhew described him as "gentle and kind" with them and during his time as governor, Prence agreed to a seven-year embargo on the sale of Indian land. That policy changed soon after his death in 1673. His successor, Josiah Winslow, a son of Pilgrim Edward Winslow and half-brother of Mayflower passengers Resolved and Peregrine White, was no friend to the Indians and became the leader of those who instigated a policy of opportunism towards them. Within this policy, Winslow proved himself one of Plymouth Colony's most unethical and aggressive purchasers of Indian real estate, using legal manipulations to remove Indians from their lands as cheaply and effectively as could be accomplished.

== Family ==
Thomas Prence married four times. He married his first wife, Patience, on August 5, 1624. Patience was the daughter of William Brewster. They had four children before she died of a "pestilent fever" in 1634. The children were named Rebecca, Thomas, Hannah and Mercy.

He next married Mary Collier, daughter of William Collier, on April 1, 1635. They had at least two children before her death, circa 1644. Their names were Jane and Mary.

His third wife was Apphia (Quicke) Freeman, whom he married sometime between 1644 and the 1660s. The couple had a daughter Judith Prence born in May 1645, AGBI.

Sometime in the 1660s (before either 1662 or 1668), Prence married for the fourth and final time. His wife was Mary, widow of Thomas Howes. He had three more children, Judith, Elizabeth and Sarah, but it is not certain which wife was the mother.

== Death and will ==
Prence's will was dated March 13, 1672/73, proved June 5, 1673. He named his wife Mary, seven surviving daughters, Jane, the wife of Mark Snow; Mary Tracy; Sarah Howes; Elizabeth Howland; Judith Barker; Hannah; and Mercy; his grandson Theophilus Mayo; his granddaughter Susanna Prence, the daughter of his deceased son Thomas; his son-in-law John Freeman; Lydia Sturtevant; and his brother Thomas Clarke. The mention in his will of his deceased son Thomas's daughter Susanna Prence indicates that he died without a surviving male heir in the Prence line. Prence engaged in many land transactions and died a wealthy man, leaving a personal estate in excess of £400 and some eleven tracts of land, with at least two of the holding 100 acres each.

Thomas Prence died March 29, 1673. He is buried at Burial Hill, a historic cemetery in Plymouth, Massachusetts where many Pilgrims are buried.

== Descendants ==
Thomas Prence's descendants number in the thousands today. Some of his notable descendants include:

- Commodore Oliver Hazard Perry (1785–1819) an officer in the US Navy. He served in the War of 1812 against Britain and earned the title "Hero of Lake Erie"
- Matthew Calbraith Perry (1794–1858) was the Commodore of the U.S. Navy who compelled the opening of Japan to the West with the Convention of Kanagawa in 1854.
- Linus Carl Pauling (1901-1994) American chemist, biochemist, peace activist, author, educator and winner of two Nobel Prizes (Chemistry, Peace).
- Benjamin F. Tracy (1830-1915) Secretary of the Navy under President Harrison and lawyer who represented the preacher Henry Ward Beecher.
