= William Brewster (Mayflower passenger) =

English colonist in North America (1560 – 1644)

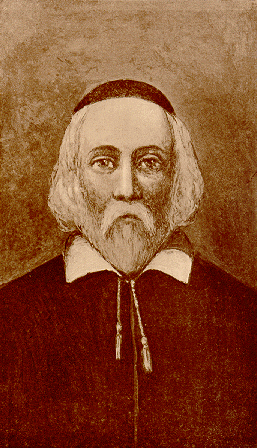
- Published in The Romantic Story of the Mayflower Pilgrims: And its place in the life of to-day, 1911
- Born: c. 1560; Scrooby, Nottinghamshire, England
- Died: 10 April 1644 (aged 76–77); Duxbury, Plymouth Colony
- Occupations: Postmaster and English teacher of Scrooby, preacher of Plymouth
- Known for: Pilgrim
- Spouse: Mary Brewster
- Children: Jonathan Brewster; Patience Brewster Prence; Fear Brewster Allerton; unnamed Brewster; Love Brewster; Wrestling Brewster
- Parent(s): William and Mary (Smythe) (Simkinson) Brewster

William Brewster (c. 1566/67 – 10 April 1644) was an English official and Mayflower passenger in 1620. He became senior elder and the leader of Plymouth Colony, by virtue of his education and existing stature with those immigrating from the Netherlands, being a Brownist (or Puritan Separatist).

== Life in England ==
William Brewster was born in 1566 or 1567, most likely in Scrooby, Nottinghamshire, England. He was the son of William Brewster and Mary (Smythe) (Simkinson) Brewster and he had a number of step-brothers and step-sisters, including James, Prudence, Henry, George, and Edward Brewster. His paternal grandparents were William Brewster (1510–1558), and Maud Mann (1513–1558). Their other children were: Fear, (vicar) Henry, Prudence and Thomas Brewster.

Beginning in 1580, he studied briefly at Peterhouse, Cambridge, before entering the service of William Davison, ambassador to the Netherlands, in 1584, giving him opportunity to hear and see more of reformed religion. Brewster was the only Pilgrim with political and diplomatic experience. With his mentor in prison, Brewster had returned home to Scrooby for a time, where he took up his father's former position as postmaster in 1590. The historian Stephen Tomkins argues that William and Mary became puritans in the mid-to-late 1590s, judging by the names of their children, which became much more puritan after Jonathan. It appears their daughter Fear, born about 1606, was named after her great-aunt Fear Brewster, who died unmarried about two years after William's daughter Fear was born.

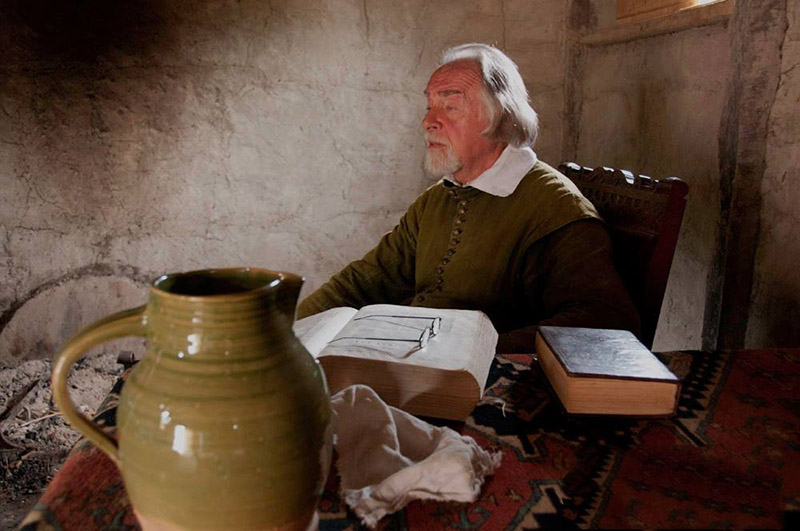
A first-person historical interpreter portraying Elder William Brewster at Plimoth Plantation

Following the campaign led by Archbishop Bancroft to force puritan ministers out of the Church of England, the Brewsters joined the Brownist church led by John Robinson and Richard Clifton, inviting them to meet in their manor house in Scrooby. Restrictions and pressures applied by the authorities convinced the congregation of a need to immigrate to the more sympathetic atmosphere of Holland, and Brewster organized the removal. Leaving England without permission was illegal at the time, so that departure was a complex matter. On its first attempt, in 1607, the group was arrested at Scotia Creek, but in 1608, Brewster and others were successful in leaving from the Humber.

== Life in the Netherlands ==
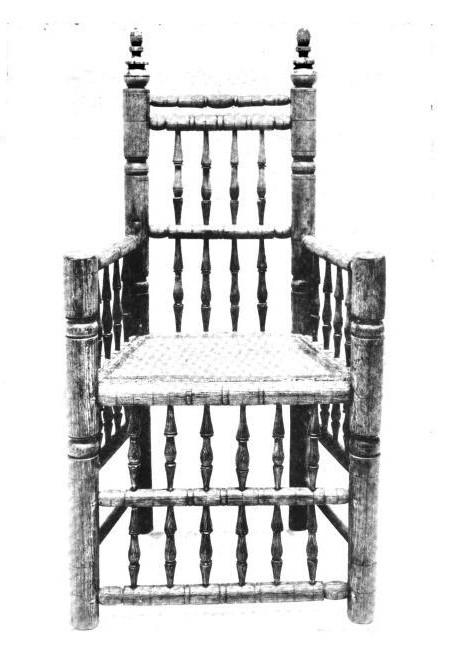
A rare 17th-century "Brewster Chair," named after William Brewster

Robinson's church lived for a year in Amsterdam, but in 1609 one of their fellow Brownist churches there led by John Smyth became the first Baptist church. In the controversy that followed, Robinson and Brewster decided to take their church to Leiden.

Brewster lived near St Peter's church (Dutch: Pieterskerk) in Leiden with his wife and children. He was chosen as assistant and later as an elder to Pastor John Robinson. He was still an elder when he travelled to Plymouth Colony in 1620.

In Leiden, the group managed to make a living. Brewster had struggled for money in Amsterdam, but in Leiden he taught English to university students. In 1610–11, Robinson and Brewster acted as mediators when the Ancient Church, the oldest Brownist congregation in Amsterdam, split into two factions following Francis Johnson and Henry Ainsworth, but they failed to reconcile them.

Brewster printed and published religious books for sale in England, but they were proscribed there. The press was prolific, printing "seven books against the regime of the Church of England in 1618 alone." In 1618, Brewster's press published De regimine Ecclesianae Scoticanae by Scottish minister David Calderwood, which was highly critical of James VI and his government of the Kirk. They followed it up in April 1619 with Perth Assembly. King James ordered an international manhunt for the writer and printer, but Brewster went underground. According to historian Stephen Tomkins, Brewster handed himself over to the Dutch authorities, who refused to send him to his death in England and so told James that they had arrested the wrong person and let him go. Tomkins judges that Brewster's printing operation "came close to ruining his church's plans for America".

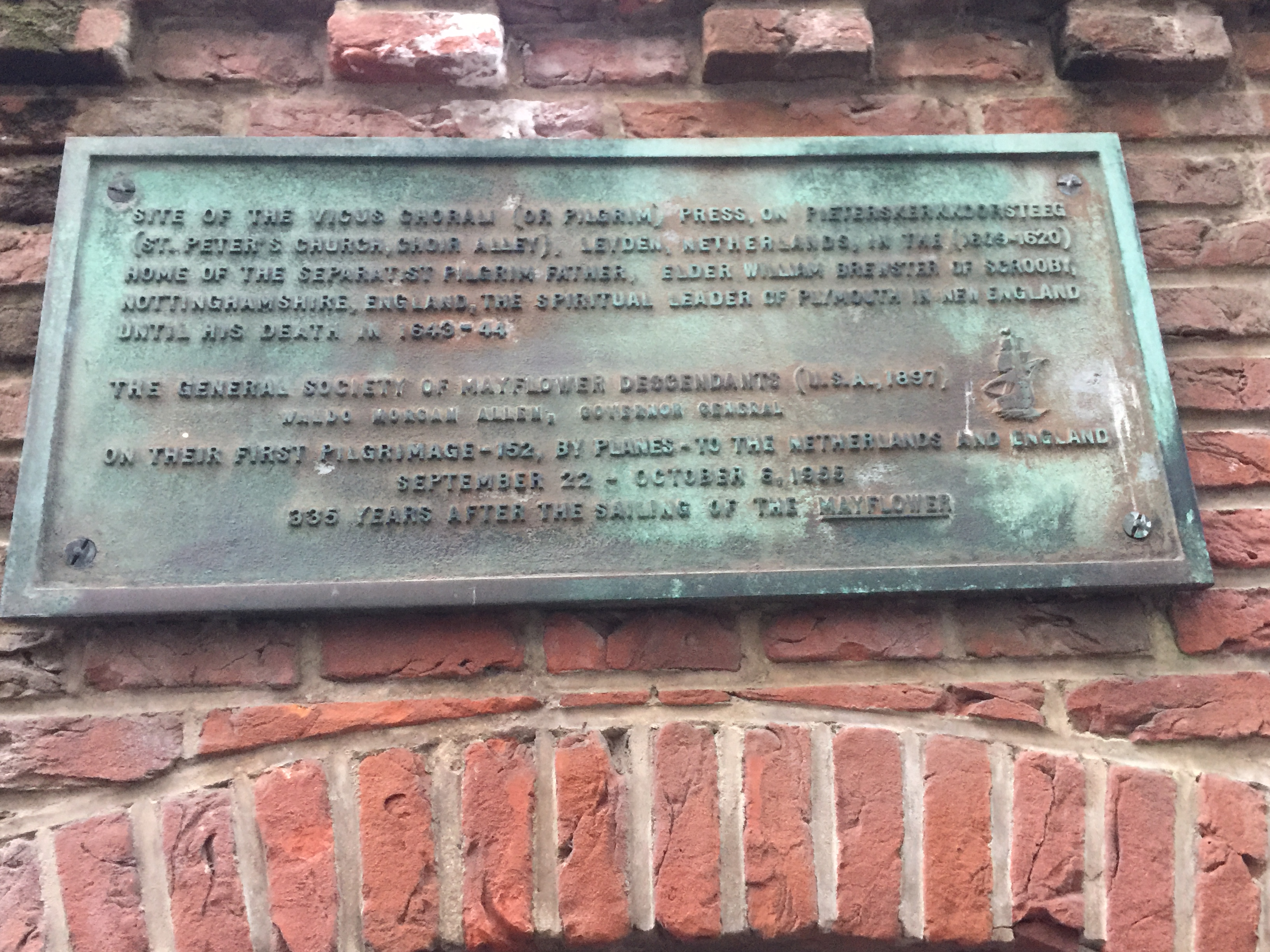
Plaque in Leiden (Pieterskerkchoorsteeg) in remembrance of Brewster

Brewster and Robinson were the prime movers in the decision to sail for America, but once he was in hiding the Separatists looked to their deacon John Carver and to Robert Cushman to carry on negotiations with the appropriate officials in London. Brewster returned to the Leiden congregation in 1620, when it was time for the Speedwell to sail to England. He had been hiding out in Netherlands and perhaps even England for the last year. At the time of his return, Brewster was the highest-ranking layman of the congregation and was their designated elder in Plymouth Colony.

Brewster joined the first group of Separatists aboard the Mayflower on the voyage to America. He was accompanied by his wife Mary and his sons Love and Wrestling.

== Mayflower voyage ==
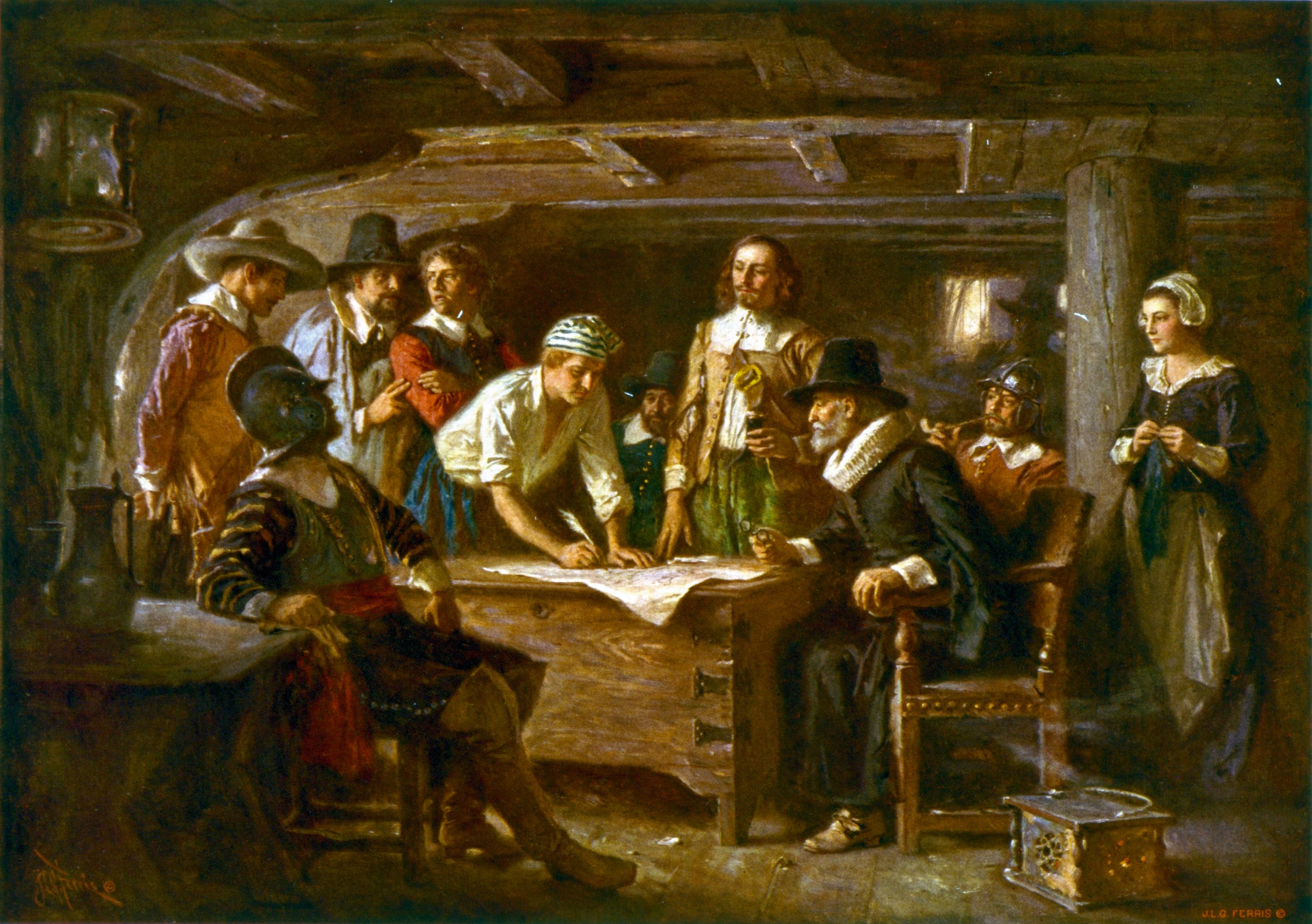
Signing the Mayflower Compact 1620, a painting by Jean Leon Gerome Ferris, 1899

Among the people boarding the Mayflower were four unaccompanied children from Shipton, Shropshire. They were placed as indentured servants with senior Separatists William Brewster, John Carver and Robert Cushman, on behalf of Samuel More, husband of the children's mother, Katherine More. The children were placed without their mother's permission after four rancorous years between the Mores over charges of adultery against Katherine and her longtime lover, the children's alleged father. Two children were placed with William and Mary Brewster.

The Mayflower departed Plymouth in England in September 1620. The 100-foot vessel carried 102 passengers and a crew of 30 to 40 in extremely cramped conditions. During the voyage, the ship was buffeted by strong westerly gales. The caulking of its planks was failing to keep out sea water, and the passengers' berths were not always dry. On the journey there were two deaths, a crew member and a passenger. After being blown off course by gales, the Mayflower made a landing at Cape Cod. Finding the area near Provincetown occupied by indigenous people, the ship's company decided to continue exploring along the nearby coast. The group arrived in the area near present-day Plymouth, Massachusetts, on 21 December 1620. In the space of several months almost half the passengers perished in the cold, harsh New England winter.

== In Plymouth Colony ==
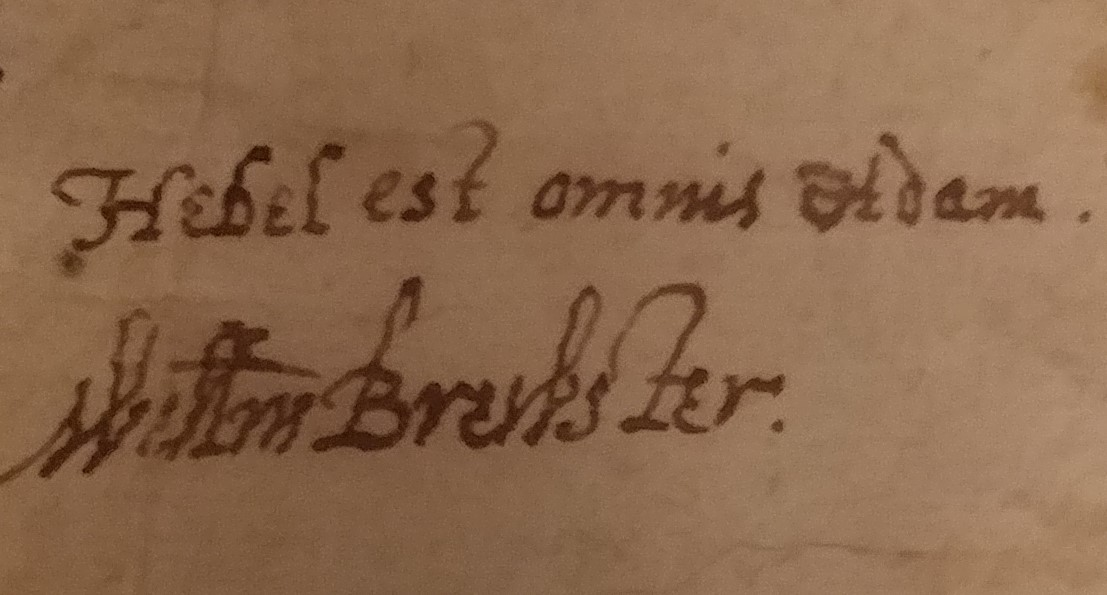
Signature of W. Brewster under his motto – Hebel est omnis Adam

When the passengers of the Mayflower landed at Plymouth Colony, Brewster became the senior elder, and so served as the religious leader of the colony; in the colony, he became a separatist leader and preacher, and eventually, as an adviser to Governor William Bradford. Brewster's son Jonathan joined the family in November 1621, arriving at Plymouth on the ship Fortune, and daughters Patience and Fear arrived in July 1623 aboard the Anne.

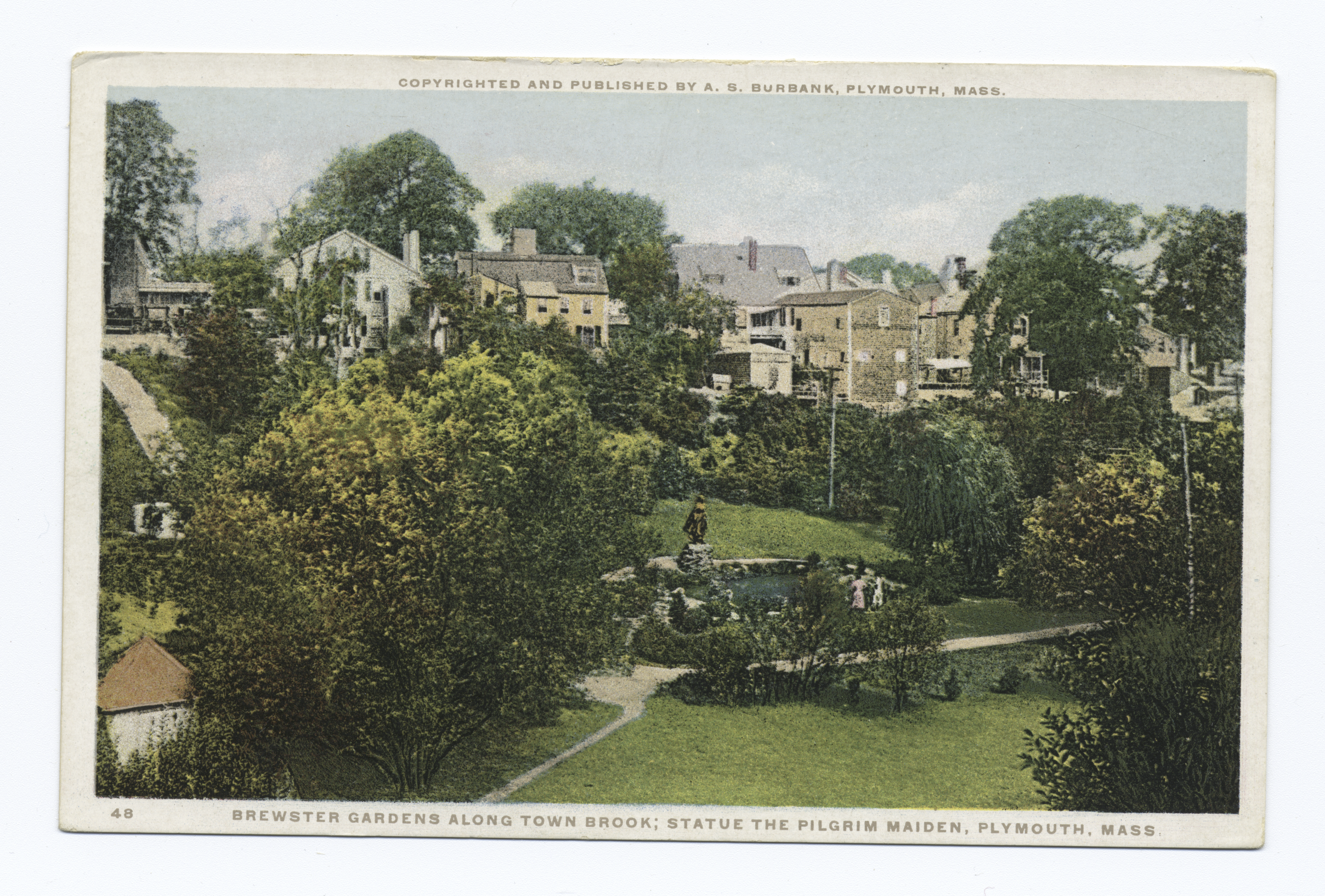
Brewster Gardens, Plymouth, Massachusetts. The park covers the original garden plot that was granted to William Brewster in 1620.

As the only university-educated member of the colony, Brewster took the part of the colony's religious leader until pastor Ralph Smith arrived in 1629. Thereafter, he continued to preach irregularly until his death in April 1644. "He was tenderhearted and compassionate of such as were in misery," Bradford wrote, "but especially of such as had been of good estate and rank and fallen unto want and poverty."

Brewster was granted land among the islands of Boston Harbor, and four of the outer islands (Great Brewster, Little Brewster, Middle Brewster, and Outer Brewster) now bear his name. In 1632, he received lands in nearby Duxbury and removed from Plymouth to create a farm there.

In 1634, smallpox and influenza ravaged both the English and the Indians in the region. Brewster's family had managed to survive the first terrible winter unscathed, but they lost daughters Fear and Patience, now married to Isaac Allerton and Thomas Prence, respectively.

== Family and other charges ==
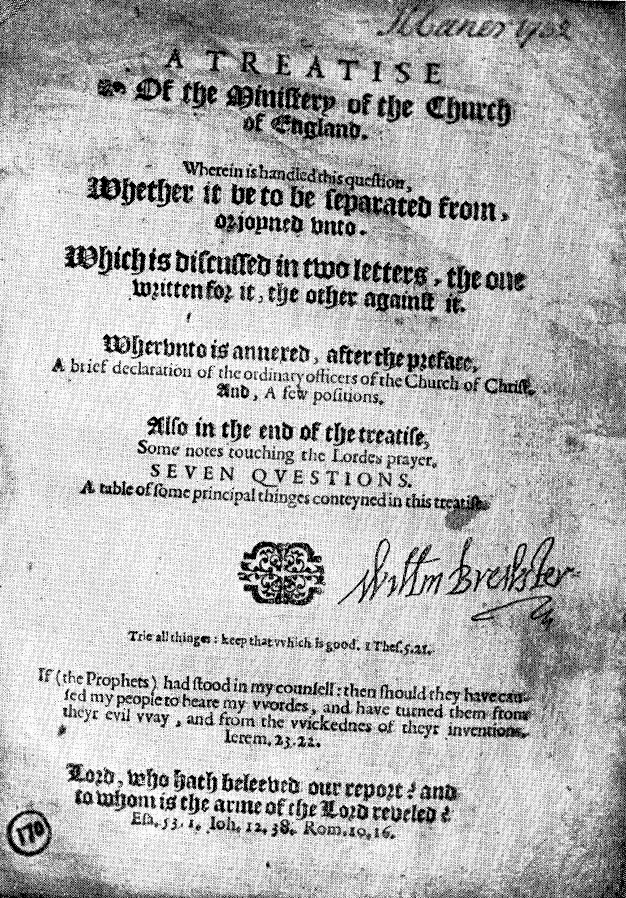
Title page of a pamphlet published by William Brewster in Leiden

=== Marriage ===
About 1590 or 1592, William Brewster married a woman named Mary, whose surname is unknown, although researchers have proposed Wentworth and Wyrall, along with a handful of children—all of which have been disproved with documentation, as summarized in the 2014 'silver' volume on William Brewster published by the General Society of Mayflower Descendants. No formal record of the marriage of William Brewster appears in the preserved marriage records of Nottinghamshire Archives. Clandestine marriages and marriages without banns or license before an officiant were not unknown in Nottinghamshire around 1590–96. Thus it is possible one of the following officiated at the marriage about 1590–92 of William Brewster: 1) his uncle Henry Brewster, vicar of Sutton-cum-Lound 1565–94; 2) John Naylor, who was vicar of North Clifton 1588–1626+ and was involved in a clandestine marriage 1 December 1591; and 3) Thomas Hancock, curate of Headon until 1592 when curate of West Retford, and who was presented in 1592 for marrying R. Southworth in Scrooby Chapel without banns or license while curate of Headon. The extensive search for further information on Mary continues, and the number of researchers include Dr Jeremy Bangs, Director of the American Pilgrim Museum in Leiden, Holland; Caleb Johnson; and Louise Throop.

=== Children ===
Their first surviving child Jonathan was born on 12 August 1593, according to "The Brewster Book" in the handwriting of Jonathan. The first three known children were born in Scrooby, Nottinghamshire. A more comprehensive list of children is as follows, although there were possibly children born 1591, 1595, 1597, and 1602, who would have possibly died in the plague of the autumn of 1603 and the winter of 1603–4. Others born 1604 and 1608 may also have died young:

1. Jonathan Brewster (12 August 1593 – 7 August 1659) married Lucretia Oldham of Derby on 10 April 1624 and were the parents of 8 children.
2. Patience Brewster (c. 1600 – 12 December 1634) married Gov. Thomas Prence of Lechlade, Gloucestershire, 4 children.
3. Fear Brewster (c. 1606 – before 1634), apparently named after her great-aunt Fear Brewster. Married Isaac Allerton of London, 2 children.
4. Unnamed child was born, died, and buried in 1609 in Leiden, Holland.
5. Love Brewster was born in Leiden, Holland about 1611 and died between 6 October 1650 and 31 January 1650–1 at Duxbury, in Plymouth Colony. At the age of about 9, he travelled on the Mayflower to Plymouth Colony with his father, mother, and brother Wrestling. There he married Sarah Collier on 15 May 1634. Love and Sarah were the parents of four children.
6. Wrestling Brewster was born in 1614 in Leiden, Holland, was living in 1627, and died unmarried before the 1644 settlement of his father's estate.

=== Other charges ===
Coat of arms of William Brewster

Three of the Mayflower pilgrims, including William Brewster, took responsibility for children of Samuel More, who accompanied him and others as indentured servants:

- Mary More, age 4, assigned as a servant of William Brewster. She died sometime in the winter of 1620–1. Her burial place is unknown, but may have been on Cole's Hill in Plymouth in an unmarked grave, as with so many others buried there that winter. As with her sister Ellen, she is recognized on the Pilgrim Memorial Tomb in Plymouth, misidentified after her sister's name as "and a brother (children)," the mistake of calling her "a brother" arising from William Bradford's failing memory years after the event of her death.
- Richard More, age 6, servant of William Brewster. He resided with the Brewster family until about mid-1627 when his term of indentureship expired. His name appears, at age 14, in a census as a member of the Brewster family, in what was called then "New Plimouth". By 1628, Richard was in the employ of Pilgrim Isaac Allerton, who was engaged in trans-Atlantic trading.

In addition to these, Jasper More, age 7, was assigned to John Carver as a servant, but died of a "common infection" in December 1620 while the Mayflower was in Cape Cod Harbor (several weeks after Elinor). He was buried ashore in the area of what is now Provincetown, where a memorial plaque bears his and the names of four others "who died at sea while the ship lay at Cape Cod Harbor" in November/December 1620. Finally, Elinor More, age 8, was assigned to Edward Winslow as a servant, but died in November 1620 soon after the arrival of the Mayflower at Cape Cod Harbor. Her burial place is unknown, but may have been ashore on Cape Cod similar to her brother Jasper. With many others who died that winter, her name appears on the Pilgrim Memorial Tomb, Cole's Hill, Plymouth, Massachusetts.

== Death ==
William Brewster died on 10 April 1644, at Duxbury, Plymouth Colony. He was predeceased by his wife, Mary Brewster, who died in April 1627, aged about sixty. A cenotaph stone was erected for him and his wife Mary, commemorating his honor; "Elder William Brewster, Patriarch of the Pilgrims and their Ruling Elder 1609–1644". William Brewster was characterized in a 1992 biography as the "father of New England" and a "sine qua non of the entire Pilgrim adventure, its backbone, its brain and its conscience." Brewster is also the subject of a one-act play, The Separatist, published in 1934, written by Hamilton playwright Mary P. Hamlin.

== Places and things named after Brewster ==
- Great Brewster Island
- Little Brewster Island
- Middle Brewster Island
- Outer Brewster Island
- Brewster, Massachusetts
- Brewster Gardens
- Brewster Chair
- Brewster, Nebraska
- Brewster, Minnesota
- William Brewstersteeg ("Brewster's Alley"), Leiden

== Notable descendants ==
Descendants of William Brewster

Elder Brewster's descendants number in the tens of thousands today. Notable among them are:

- Isaac Allerton Jr., merchant and Colonial Virginia officeholder
- H. Verlan Andersen, LDS General Authority
- Roger Nash Baldwin, co-founder of the American Civil Liberties Union (ACLU)
- Alfred Ely Beach, inventor, publisher, and patent lawyer
- Harriot Eaton Stanton Blatch, writer and suffragist, daughter of Elizabeth Cady Stanton
- Nora Stanton Blatch Barney, suffragist, granddaughter of Elizabeth Cady Stanton
- Lindy Boggs, first woman elected to Congress from Louisiana
- Bishop Benjamin Brewster, Episcopal Bishop of Maine, Missionary Bishop of Western Colorado
- Benjamin Brewster, industrialist, financier, original trustee of Standard Oil
- Chauncey B. Brewster, fifth Bishop of the Episcopal Diocese of Connecticut
- Cora Belle Brewster (1859–?), physician, surgeon, medical writer, editor
- David Brewster, journalist
- Diane Brewster, television actress
- Flora A. Brewster (1852–1919), Baltimore's first woman surgeon
- James Brewster, coachbuilder, immortalized in Cole Porter's song "You're the Top"
- Janet Huntington Brewster, philanthropist, writer, and radio broadcaster
- John Brewster Jr., painter
- Jordana Brewster, actress
- Kingman Brewster Jr., educator and diplomat
- Paget Brewster, actress
- Ralph Owen Brewster, United States Senator from Maine
- Austin Butler, actor
- Chevy Chase, actor
- Julia Child, chef and television personality
- Bob Crosby, Dixieland bandleader and vocalist
- Bing Crosby, singer and actor
- Frances Jane "Fanny" Crosby, hymnwriter
- Ted Danson, actor
- Angela Davis, political activist, philosopher, academic, and author.
- Howard Dean, physician, former governor of Vermont, 2004 presidential candidate
- Clint Dempsey, soccer player
- Allen Welsh Dulles, Director of Central Intelligence, member of the Warren Commission
- Avery Dulles, Jesuit priest, theologian, professor and Roman Catholic cardinal
- John Foster Dulles, U.S. Secretary of State under President Eisenhower
- John Ely, Revolutionary War colonel
- Richard Gere, actor
- Lawrence Henry Gipson, historian
- Dorothy Lake Gregory, artist and illustrator
- William F. Halsey Jr., Fleet Admiral, USN
- Hannibal Hamlin, fifteenth U.S. Vice President, under President Lincoln
- Katharine Hepburn, actress
- Martha Hillard, educator and community leader
- Joe Kennedy III, U.S. special envoy to Northern Ireland, former Democratic U.S. Representative from Massachusetts, a member of the Kennedy family and a grandnephew of President John F. Kennedy
- Ernest Lester Jones, head of the USGS; co-founder of the American Legion
- Ashley Judd, actress
- Oliver La Farge, writer and anthropologist
- George Trumbull Ladd, philosopher and psychologist
- Taylor Lautner, actor
- John Lithgow, actor
- Henry Wadsworth Longfellow, poet
- Rachael MacFarlane, voice actress
- Seth MacFarlane, writer, producer and voice actor
- Brewster Kahle, Digital Librarian of the Internet Archive
- Andrew MacLeish, poet and 9th Librarian of Congress, son of Martha Hillard
- Kenneth MacLeish, recipient of the Navy Cross, son of Martha Hillard
- Edwin Markham, American poet
- Jan Garrigue Masaryk, Czech diplomat and politician
- Neal A. Maxwell (1926–2004), American theologian, author, lecturer
- George B. McClellan, Civil War general; politician
- Noah Mills, model and actor
- Tia Mowry, American actress
- Tamera Mowry, American actress
- Tahj Mowry, American actor
- Robert Noyce, inventor of the integrated circuit
- Sarah Palin, former Governor of Alaska, 2008 Republican vice presidential nominee
- Harold E. B. Pardee, American cardiologist
- Commodore Matthew C. Perry, U.S. Navy commander at the opening of Japan
- Commodore Oliver Hazard Perry, U.S. Navy commander, War of 1812
- James Leonard Plimpton, inventor
- Thomas Pynchon, novelist
- Cokie Roberts, journalist and author
- John Trumbull Robinson, U.S. attorney for the district of Connecticut
- Abby Rockefeller Mauzé, philanthropist
- David Rockefeller, economist and investment banker
- Jay Rockefeller, U.S. Senator from West Virginia
- John D. Rockefeller III, philanthropist
- Laurance Rockefeller, businessman, financier, philanthropist, and conservationist
- Nelson Rockefeller, 49th Governor of New York, 41st U.S. Vice President, businessman, philanthropist
- Winthrop Rockefeller, governor of Arkansas
- Brandon Routh, model and actor
- Buffy Sainte-Marie American singer-songwriter, Academy Award winner
- Pete Seeger, American Folk Singer
- Brewster H. Shaw, NASA astronaut
- Elizabeth Short
- Andrew Shue, actor
- Elisabeth Shue, actress
- Robert P. Shuler, American evangelist
- David Souter, Associate Justice of the U.S. Supreme Court
- Zack Snyder, director, producer, screenwriter, and cinematographer
- Henry Stanton, abolitionist, social reformer
- Adlai Stevenson III, U.S. Senator from Illinois
- Arthur Ochs Sulzberger Jr., publisher of The New York Times
- Telford Taylor (24 February 1908 – 23 May 1998), an American lawyer best known for his role as Counsel for the Prosecution at the Nuremberg Trials after World War II. Descendant of William Brewster's daughter, Patience.
- Zachary Taylor, 12th President of the United States
- Kip Thorne, theoretical physicist; his 6th great-grandparents were Tabitha Brewster and Phineas Strong
- Bill Weld, governor of Massachusetts
- Cyrus Wesley Peck Victoria Cross awardee from WW1
- Stuart Taylor Wood, ninth Commissioner of the Royal Canadian Mounted Police
- Sewall Green Wright, geneticist

== Sources ==
- Chisholm, Hugh, ed. (1911). "Brewster, William" . Encyclopædia Britannica. Vol. 4 (11th ed.). Cambridge University Press. p. 514.
- Jones, Emma C. Brewster (1908). The Brewster Genealogy, 1566–1907: A Record of the Descendants of William Brewster of the "Mayflower," Ruling Elder of the Pilgrim Church Which Founded Plymouth Colony in 1620, New York, NY, US: Grafton Press.
- Philbrick, Nathaniel (2006). Mayflower : a story of courage, community, and war. New York: Viking. ISBN 0-670-03760-5. OCLC 62766154.
- Wilson, J. G.; Fiske, J., eds. (1900). "Brewster, William (pilgrim)" . Appletons' Cyclopædia of American Biography. New York: D. Appleton.
