= Jonathan Brewster (colonist) =

American settler (1593–1659)

- Born: August 12, 1593; Scrooby, Nottinghamshire, England
- Died: August 7, 1659 (aged 65); New London, New London County, Connecticut
- Known for: Early American settler
- Spouse: Lucretia Oldham
- Children: William, Mary, Jonathan, Ruth, Benjamin, Elizabeth, Grace and Hannah
- Parent(s): William Brewster, Mary Brewster

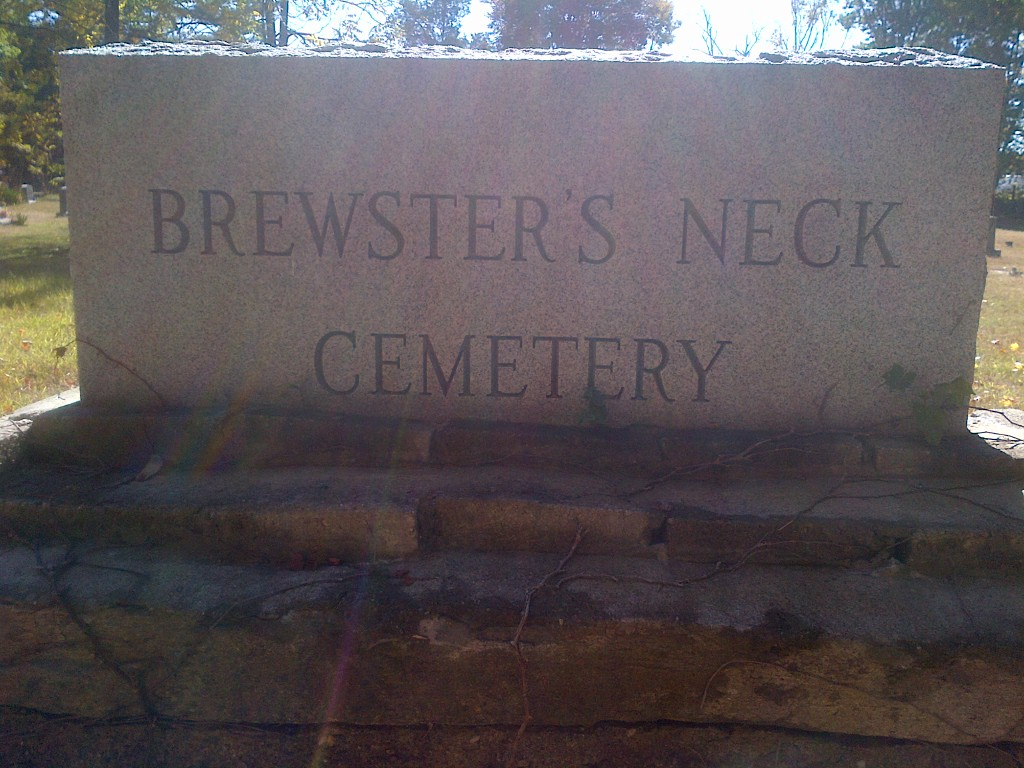
Marker at the gate of Brewster's Neck Cemetery in Preston CT where Jonathan and Lucretia Brewster and some of their descendants are buried

Jonathan Brewster (August 12, 1593 – August 7, 1659) was an early American settler, the son and eldest child of elder William Brewster and his wife, Mary. Brewster had two younger sisters, Patience and Fear, and two younger brothers, Love and Wrestling along with an unnamed brother who died young.

== Life ==
Coat of arms of William Brewster

Brewster was born in Scrooby, Nottinghamshire, on August 12, 1593. In around 1610, he accompanied his family to Leiden in Holland, where he married his first wife. Brewster did not join his family on the Mayflower in 1620, however. He stayed behind in Leiden instead with his wife, who died soon after, and their infant son, who also died. Brewster would have been 27 at the time. Brewster came to America on the ship Fortune in 1621.

On April 10, 1624, in Plymouth, Brewster married Lucretia Oldham, the daughter of William Oldham and Phillipa Sowter; her brother was Captain John Oldham, whose slaying led to the Pequot Indian war. Brewster and Oldham had eight children.

From 1652 to 1658 he put considerable effort into searching for the philosopher's stone.

Brewster died on August 7, 1659, in New London, Connecticut, at the age of 65. He was buried in Brewster's Plain, Norwich, Connecticut.

== Descendants ==
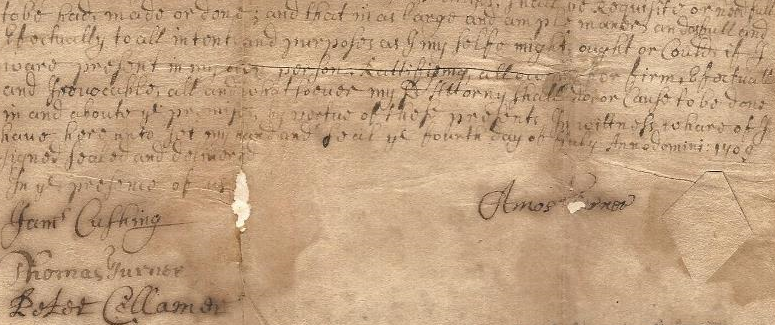
A manuscript signed by Amos Turner who was a grandson of Jonathan Brewster. Courtesy of Shiwei Jiang of Virginia.

Jonathan Brewster married Lucretia Oldham, originally of Derby, on 10 April 1624 in Plymouth. Their children were:

- (Possibly) Nathaniel Brewster (born April 1622)
- William Brewster (born March 9, 1625)
- Mary Brewster (born April 16, 1627, mother of Amos Turner)
- Jonathan Brewster, Jr. (born July 17, 1629)
- Ruth Brewster (born October 3, 1631)
- Benjamin Brewster (born November 17, 1633; died September 14, 1710)
- Elizabeth Brewster (born May 1, 1637)
- Grace Brewster (born November 1, 1639; died April 22, 1684)
- Hannah Brewster (born November 3, 1641)

John Turner (?-1697) and Mary Brewster (1627-1697) gave birth to Ezekial Turner (1650-1704).
