= Mary Brewster =

Early English colonist in North America

Mary Brewster (c. 1569 – April 17, 1627) was a Pilgrim and one of the women on the Mayflower.

She was the wife of Elder William Brewster. She was one of only five adult women from the Mayflower to survive the first winter in the New World, and one of only four such to survive to the "first Thanksgiving" in 1621, which she helped cook. As such, she is included in Plimoth Plantation's reenactment of that Thanksgiving.

She had six children with William: Jonathan, Patience, Fear, an unnamed child who died young, Love, and Wrestling.

Her son, Jonathan Brewster (1593–1659) and his wife Lucretia Oldham, had nine children. One of those children was also named Mary Brewster.

Her life in England is unknown, as is her maiden name; maiden names of Wentworth, Love, Wyrall, and others have been suggested.
