= William Vassall =

English colonist in Massachusetts Bay Colony (1592–1656)

English colonist William Vassall (1592–1656) is remembered both for promoting religious freedom in New England and commencing his family's ownership of slave plantations in the Caribbean. A patentee of the Massachusetts Bay Company, Vassall was among the merchants who petitioned Puritan courts for greater civil liberties and religious tolerance. In 1647, he and John Child published New-England’s Jonas cast up in London, a tract describing the efforts of colonial petitioners. By early 1648, Vassall moved to Barbados to establish a slave-labor sugar plantation. He and his descendants were among the Caribbean's leading planters, enslaving more than 3,865 people before Britain abolished slavery in 1833.

== Family ==
Coat of Arms of William Vassall

William Vassall's paternal grandfather, Huguenot Jean Vassall, sent his son John to England from the family's native Normandy when religious dissension arose. A man of “great wealth,” John Vassall (1548–1625) fitted out and commanded two ships against the Spanish Armada, assistance rewarded by Queen Elizabeth I with a grant of arms. In 1618, he purchased two shares of stock in the Virginia Company at a cost of £25.10, beginning a centuries-long family tradition of investment in colonial enterprises. William was the son of John Vassall and his second wife, Anna Russell. He was baptized in Stepney, Middlesex, on 27 August 1592. On 9 June 1613, he obtained a license to marry Anna King in Cold Norton, Essex. The couple had ten children; five daughters (Judith, Frances, Anna, Margaret, Mary) and one son (John) survived to adulthood.

== Massachusetts: 1628–1630 ==
In March 1628, brothers William and Samuel Vassall were among the original patentees of the Massachusetts Bay Company. Both were named Assistants in 1629. Initially, William Vassall took an active role in company leadership. In 1629, he was appointed to the committee to consider the division of lands and to the committee to resolve orders. On 26 August 1629, he was among the twelve men who signed the Cambridge Agreement and pledged to be ready “to embark for the said plantation” by 1 March 1630.

In summer 1629, the Company sent “some fifty persons from Salem to begin the settlement of Charlestown.” Two settlers were forced back to England when they attempted to establish an Episcopal church. John and Samuel Brown asked William and Samuel Vassall to represent them in the dispute. Attorney John Winthrop spoke on the company's behalf, defending the Browns’ removal. This was Vassall's first confrontation with Winthrop on the issue of religious tolerance. Winthrop always won. The Company confiscated the Browns’ private letters, and the “principle was virtually laid down that the Episcopal form of worship would not be tolerated in the colony.”

At a 20 October 1629 meeting of the Massachusetts Bay Company, Winthrop was elected Governor, and Vassall was reelected as an Assistant. On 23 March 1630, they were among the eight men who attended the last Court of Assistants held in England, aboard the flagship Arbella at port in Southampton. Within months, Vassall would sail to New England in the same fleet that carried Winthrop and the other Assistants, perhaps aboard the Lyon. In total, fifteen ships transported about 1,500 people to Massachusetts in 1630. Their emigration initiated an event known as the Puritan Great Migration when as many as 21,000 people emigrated to New England between 1630 and 1640.

According to Deputy Governor Thomas Dudley, “Mr. Vassal, one of the Assistants, and his Family” returned with the Lyon when it was sent back to England for provisions in July, a month after its arrival. The Vassalls—including four children aged one through eleven—were not alone on the return voyage. Dudley notes that some fled the colony “out of fear of famine” and others “out of dislike of our Government.” When the family returned to an economically stable New England in five years, they chose to make their home not in Massachusetts Bay, but in its more tolerant neighbor to the south, Plymouth Colony.

== Scituate, Plymouth: 1635–1645 ==
The Vassalls’ third transatlantic crossing was aboard the Blessing in summer 1635. The family stayed with Rev. John Eliot in Roxbury, while Vassall claimed an extensive tract of “very advantageously situated land” in the new Plymouth settlement of Scituate. In 1636, he built one of the first homes in the village, naming it “Belle House,” and on 27 November, he joined the village church.

Vassall's estate was “by far the largest tract allotted to any one settler,” and Scituate's minister, Rev. John Lothrop, was among the fifteen freemen who asked the court to reduce its size, arguing that their allotments were too small for sustenance. On 1 January 1637, the court decided in favor of the freemen and reduced Vassall's lot by 200-300 acres. The decision required the freemen to maintain a ferry. They apparently failed to do so, for on 2 April 1638, the court granted Vassall 200 acres “to keep a ferry over the north river” and set its rates. Vassall's efforts to enlarge his land continued, and on 3 December 1638, he was granted an additional 150 acres “provided he take the oath of fidelity.” He took the oath on 1 February 1639, and on 3 June, the court settled “his differences with his neighbors at the harbor” and made final the 150-acre addition. On 3 December 1639, Vassall received permission to make an oyster bank in the North River near his estate, West Newland. Use of the bank by others required his license.

While in Scituate, Vassall served on a council of war formed in September 1642 when settlers feared Narragansett reprisal, and in 1643, he appeared on the list of men able to bear arms. Because he owned one of the few surveying instruments in the colony, Vassall was sometimes called upon to set bounds between disputing landowners. But Vassall was best known for causing, not resolving, controversy, and he became a leader in the dispute that permanently split the Scituate Church in two.

The issue of baptism had long made the Scituate Church “inharmonious,” and when Rev. Lothrop moved to Barnstable in October 1639, more than half the congregation moved with him. The seven male members who remained—Vassall among them—were themselves divided. Four of the seven called Charles Chauncy to be their minister. Vassall led the opposition against Chauncy, which ostensibly centered on the issues of baptism and communion. Chauncy believed baptism required full immersion, even for infants, and held “sprinkling” to be “unlawful.” Vassall agreed with colony leadership and most New England ministers that “immersion or dipping was lawful—but in this cold country, not so convenient.”

Unlike Chauncy and most of his peers, Vassall believed New England's churches should open communion and baptism to all members of the Church of England, not simply those who completed the often-arduous task of joining a colonial congregation. Chauncy accused Vassall of being “inclined to the Bishops”—the Anglican hierarchy—and directed those Scituate members who opposed his call “to refrain from appearing at communion,” thereby depriving them of the “rights and privileges of membership.” The excluded members met on 2 February 1642, probably in Vassall's home, to sign a church covenant, founding a new “upriver” parish. Chauncy cried foul, and rancor between the men continued unabated for years, as evidenced by the volume of correspondence they produced. Vassall's letters frequently focused on a “division of lands and commons” to ensure that Scituate's second parish was “at least equal” in land to its first. The plan would have increased his extensive property. The church is now known as First Parish, Norwell.

In early 1642, Vassall wrote to Maine Gov. Thomas Gorges, warning him against hiring Rev. Joseph Hull, who had been displaced when Lothrop moved to Barnstable. When Hull took a job at a neighboring church without Lothrop's permission, he was excommunicated and a warrant was issued for his arrest. He fled to Maine. In his 17 May reply to Vassall, Gorges said he was “shocked” by Vassall's letter and stood by Hull, explaining, “As for … neighbors here I shall not press their consciences but leave them to their own liberty. Vassall would later petition Plymouth and Massachusetts for the very religious freedom he had hoped to deny Rev. Hull.

== New England Petitions: 1645–1646 ==
By the early 1640s, “the New England economy was turning downward.” Plymouth Colony, harder hit economically than Massachusetts Bay, was “rapidly and irretrievably declining.” Migration “stopped” in 1640 with England's establishment of the Long Parliament, as Puritans no longer feared persecution in their homeland. That year, the number of people returning to England outpaced the number of new arrivals. In 1642, following the outbreak of Civil War, an estimated “seven to ten percent of colonists, including nearly one-third of clergymen, returned to England to assist in the war effort.”

In 1644, the Bay Colony enacted a ban against Anabaptists and other non-Puritan Protestants, and in summer 1645, Massachusetts magistrates attempted to extend the law to other colonies in the New England Confederation, including Plymouth. In response to both the economic decline and the continuing codification of intolerance, merchants and entrepreneurs like Vassall and his associate Robert Child led efforts to make the colonies more tolerant and thus more welcoming to new residents and investors.

In autumn 1645, the order suppressing Anabaptists and other non-Puritans was debated at a sitting of Plymouth's Court of Elections where Vassall served as Scituate's deputy. He “singly objected” to the matter being heard in a Court of Elections, but despite “a whole day's agitation,” the order was allowed. Vassall was again present when the General Court sat a week later. Several Assistants, absent in the previous session, called for the order to be “defaced and crossed.” Gov. William Bradford, who supported the law, agreed to “leave it to the next court, where it might be repealed if the Country saw fit.” Vassall was “not content with having stopped the order’s progress” and proposed that Plymouth “allow and maintain full and free tolerance of religion to all men that would preserve the civil peace, and submit unto Government; and there was no limitation or exception against Turk, Jew, Papist, … or any other.”

A “majority of the General Court of Plymouth” were in favor of Vassall's measure, which would have passed had Gov. Bradford not blocked a vote, claiming religious liberty “would eat out the power of godliness.” Bradford's “arbitrary action” gave the court's conservative minority “time to maneuver effectively” against the proposal. Leadership so opposed the Vassall's plan that it omitted any mention of it in official documents. Ironically, a Plymouth leader who “utterly abhorred” the petition, Edward Winslow, ensured its preservation in a detailed 25 November 1645 letter to Winthrop.

In a 6 May 1646 Journal entry, Winthrop characterizes Vassall as “a man of a busy and factious spirit, and always opposed to the civil governments of this country and the way of our Churches.” According to Winthrop, Vassall petitioned both Plymouth and the Bay, complaining settlers were denied access to the sacraments and “deprived of all power … in civil affairs” unless they “submitted to a church covenant,” and he called for the colonies to end “arbitrary government and extrajudicial proceedings” and be “wholly governed by the laws of England.” Vassall threatened to petition Parliament if he failed in the colonies.

Winthrop reports that Vassall's petition was followed by one “to the same effect, much enlarged.” Presented to the General Court at Boston on 19 May, the Remonstrance of 1646 was signed by six merchants and entrepreneurs led by Dr. Robert Child. Like Vassall, the men were neither religious apologists nor "liberals." They petitioned the Court "because the Bay Colony's religious and political climate...threatened to undermine the success" of their endeavors. The petitioners “focused on the social and economic implications of Massachusetts authorities’ intolerance, political exclusivity, and departures from English custom” and intended their “reforms to reverse Massachusetts’ decline.”

Massachusetts magistrates were “most enraged” by the petitioners’ claim that they could challenge colonial jurisdiction by appealing decisions to Parliament. This was not an empty threat. Vassall and Child were a “very formidable and dangerous opposition” largely because both were wealthy enough to travel to London—the Childs were “well-to-do,” and Vassall was one of the richest men in New England—and both men had brothers serving in Parliament. MP John Child was then in the majority. In 1646, MP Samuel Vassall sat on the Commission for Foreign Plantations and signed two documents favorable to colonist Samuel Gorton in his successful dispute with Massachusetts in May of that year.

William Vassall did not sign the Remonstrance, though his residence in Plymouth did not preclude him from doing so. Two men who signed the document—Robert Child and John Smith—were “strangers” in Massachusetts, and Vassall had previously petitioned both colonies. Because his name was not on the document, Vassall escaped the harsh punishment that befell the Remonstrants. In a lengthy Journal entry of 4 November 1646, Winthrop reports the General Court charged the seven petitioners with sedition for the “false and scandalous passages” in their petition, not the act of petitioning itself. Among the twelve charges, the men were accused of defaming the government, weakening the authority and esteem of laws, slandering the churches, and kindling discontent. Because they refused to “acknowledge their miscarriage,” the petitioners were fined in sums from £10 to £50 each.

Vassall and Remonstrants Robert Child and Thomas Fowle prepared to sail to England to carry their petitions to the Commissioners for Plantations, but on the evening of their planned departure, Child and fellow petitioner John Dand were arrested and searched. Various “seditious” documents were found with Dand in Child's hand, and both men were imprisoned. Vassall and Fowle sailed to England aboard the Supply on 9 November 1646.

== New-England’s Jonas cast up at London: 1647 ==
Shortly before the Supply sailed in early November 1646, Boston's Rev. John Cotton delivered a sermon, declaring that “the Remonstrance would be as a Jonas to the ship carrying it and exhorted the ship's master to throw it overboard should a storm arise so that the ship might be saved.” When the ship found itself in stormy seas (as expected in a winter crossing), several passengers remembered his words. To calm one “distracted” passenger, Fowle gave the woman a spare copy of a Boston petition, which she tossed into the sea. But, as a “gentleman” eyewitness—almost certainly Vassall himself—writes in a 1647 pamphlet, “the storm did not leave us upon the throwing of the Paper,” and the ship encountered “many great storms” before they arrived in Bristol on 19 December. Cotton's sermon became widely known, and the pamphlet's title, New-England’s Jonas cast up at London, reminded the “public of how the story of Jonah ultimately played out: namely that Jonah survived in the belly of the great beast” to be “vomited up on shore” to “fulfill his obligation to preach.”

Published in London on or before 15 April 1647, New-England’s Jonas appeared as a small 24-page tract of four interrelated sections, three of which reprint Bay Colony documents. The title page identifies English MP Major John Child as the pamphlet's sole author, but Edward Winslow claimed it was primarily William Vassall's work. Scholarship since the colonial period has credited both men, and the U.S. Library of Congress lists both Child and Vassall as the authors of New-England’s Jonas.

The tract begins with a brief preface by Major John Child, whose brother Robert was under house arrest in Massachusetts under the security of an £800 bond at the time of writing. Section one of Jonas is devoted to three documents related to the 1645 magistrates’ decision to overturn a vote for militia leader in Hingham, a controversy which led to an attempted impeachment of Deputy Gov. John Winthrop.”

Section two of New-England’s Jonas begins with the complete text of the 1646 Remonstrance. For nine full pages—some 2,900 words—the Remonstrants used the rhetoric of Puritan preachers against the colony itself. In dramatic terms, they describe how God’s hand had turned against the colony, “blasting all our designs,” bringing many good estates “to the brinks of extreme poverty,” and “striking” others with “malignant sicknesses” and “shameful diseases.” They offer the Remonstrance as a correction and call for (1) the establishment of English common law in Massachusetts; (2) the extension of the vote to all well-behaving freeborn Englishmen; and (3) access to sacraments for all Church of England members or the liberty to form churches of their own.

Vassall and John Child follow the Remonstrance with a brief summation of the petition's “effects,” including “large and defamatory declarations” against the petitioners in sermons. More ominously, one magistrate claimed in open court that the petition subverted “the very foundations of both Church and Commonwealth,” echoing the language of a Massachusetts law that called for the death of any man who attempted “the alteration and subversion of our frame of Polity or Government fundamentally.” Robert Child and John Dand were thus “in danger of their lives.”

Section three of New-England’s Jonas reprints the Capital Laws of Massachusetts, 1641–1642, providing Parliament and the public with evidence that Massachusetts laws were not based on English Common Law, but the Puritan's reading of scripture, as each capital law is followed by a Biblical citation. Jonas also includes the full text of the Freeman's Oath. “Its importance lay in the fact that it afforded printed evidence that nowhere in it is any reference made to the King's Majesty, or of allegiance to any power on earth save that of their own Government.”

Section four of New-England’s Jonas is the eyewitness account intended “to refute the widespread belief that Vassal and his party narrowly escaped a prognosticated catastrophe while crossing the Atlantic by casting their petition into the sea.” The tract's postscript attacks Edward Winslow, sent by the Bay General Court to make their case against the right of colonists to petition Parliament. Jonas describes Winslow as “a principal opposer of the laws of England, in New-England.” Vassall and Winslow were well acquainted; in 1640, Winslow became father-in-law to Vassall's daughter Judith, and in 1645, he penned the letter warning Winthrop of Vassall's attempt to establish freedom of religion in Plymouth.

Taken together, the documents gathered in New-England’s Jonas show Massachusetts considered itself “entirely independent of the British Parliament in all matters of government” and believed it exercised “absolute power” over its affairs, including the power “to rule, punish, pardon, etc.” Vassall was among those who “denied this contention of the leaders.” He was a signatory to the 1629 Bay Company Charter, which guaranteed “all liberties and immunities of free and natural subjects” to residents of Massachusetts as if they “were born within the realm of England.” Vassall thus believed “any colonist had a right of appeal to England. Winthrop refused definitively to recognize this right.” On this fundamental point, Vassall's petitions of 1646 and the Remonstrance “brought forward the whole relation of the Colony to England.”

Six weeks after Jonas was printed, in a letter dated 25 May 1648, the Commission advised the colony that it would not “encourage any appeals from your justice,” but “leave you with all that freedom and latitude that may, in any respect, be duly claimed by you.” “With that, the Commission refused to interfere in the decisions of the colonial government,” defeating Vassall and his fellow petitioners.

On 29 May 1647, Winslow published his own tract: NEW-ENGLAND’S SALAMANDER, DISCOVERED By an irreligious and scornful Pamphlet, called New England’s cast up at London, &c. Owned by Major John Childe, but not probable to be written by him. Winslow begins Salamander by addressing Child, noting that if he were “well acquainted” with those who “came lately from New-England,” he would not “father” their “falsehoods and irreligious jeers and scoffs.” He adds, “no man is or ever was better acquainted with the phrase or writings of another, than I am with your chief animator to this undertaking, whom I call New-England’s Salamander, because of his constant and many years exercise, and delight in opposition to whatsoever hath been judged most wholesome and safe” for the “country (from whence he last came) either in politics or ecclesiastics.”

In his Journal, Winthrop identifies Winslow's Salamander as “Mr. Vassall, a man never at rest except in the fire of contention.” On 10 May 1648, Winthrop reported news received from England: Vassall, “who went from Scituate to petition against the country,” had moved to Barbados.

== Slave Plantation, Barbados: 1648–1656 ==
Brothers William and Samuel Vassall invested in “nearly all aspects of English Atlantic colonization during the first half of the seventeenth century,” and “slavery formed an integral part of the Vassall’s colonial operation.” Samuel Vassall financed ships running the Middle Passage and was the major shareholder of the Guinea Company, founded to supply enslaved labor to the colonies. By early 1648, William Vassall moved to Barbados to take advantage of the global "sugar boom and the reality of rapid and immense fortunes to be accrued." He purchased land in St. Michael and people to work it. "From that point, the family built its wealth by running slave-labor plantations in the Caribbean." Vassall also represented “the interests of several New England merchants on the island.” He served as commissioner of the highways in 1652, and in 1655, “he was appointed a commissioner for implementing the Navigation Acts.”

The Vassalls’ “family life in St. Michael was one of lavish magnificence," although the people they enslaved were subjected to the "crudest" of conditions. English visitors to their home reported being "shocked" that the slaves “who waited on tables loaded in silver plate” wore “the scantiest of clothing, and that often in tatters." Sugar slavery was “hugely profitable,” despite being “one of the most deadly forms of slavery ever invented.” “Returns from the commodities produced by enslaved people were so great that it was profitable to work African men, women and children to death.” On average, workers died within seven years of enslavement. Because the English knew slavery to be brutal, they made it illegal to enslave Christians, and they "policed the line between slave and free by restricting access to baptism." When courts began emancipating slaves who converted to Christianity, "slave owners adapted: they introduced a new language of exclusion based on 'whiteness' rather than Christian status."

Vassall made his will in Barbados on 13 July 1655. One-third of his estates in Barbados, New England, and elsewhere went to his only son, John; the remaining two-thirds was divided evenly between his daughters. Vassall's wife Anna King is unnamed in the document. Vassall chose son John as his sole executor and directed son-in-law Nicholas Ware, husband of Anna, to remain on the plantation, acting as manager until John's order or arrival. Vassall did not sign the document, but “made his mark” in the presence of witnesses, suggesting he suffered injury or infirmity.

William Vassall's date of death and place of burial are unknown, though the year is widely given as 1656 when he was 64. He likely died between 13 July 1655, when he wrote his will, and 8 May 1656, when Ware arranged for the sale of Vassall's Scituate estate. His will was proved on 12 June 1657.

== Legacy ==
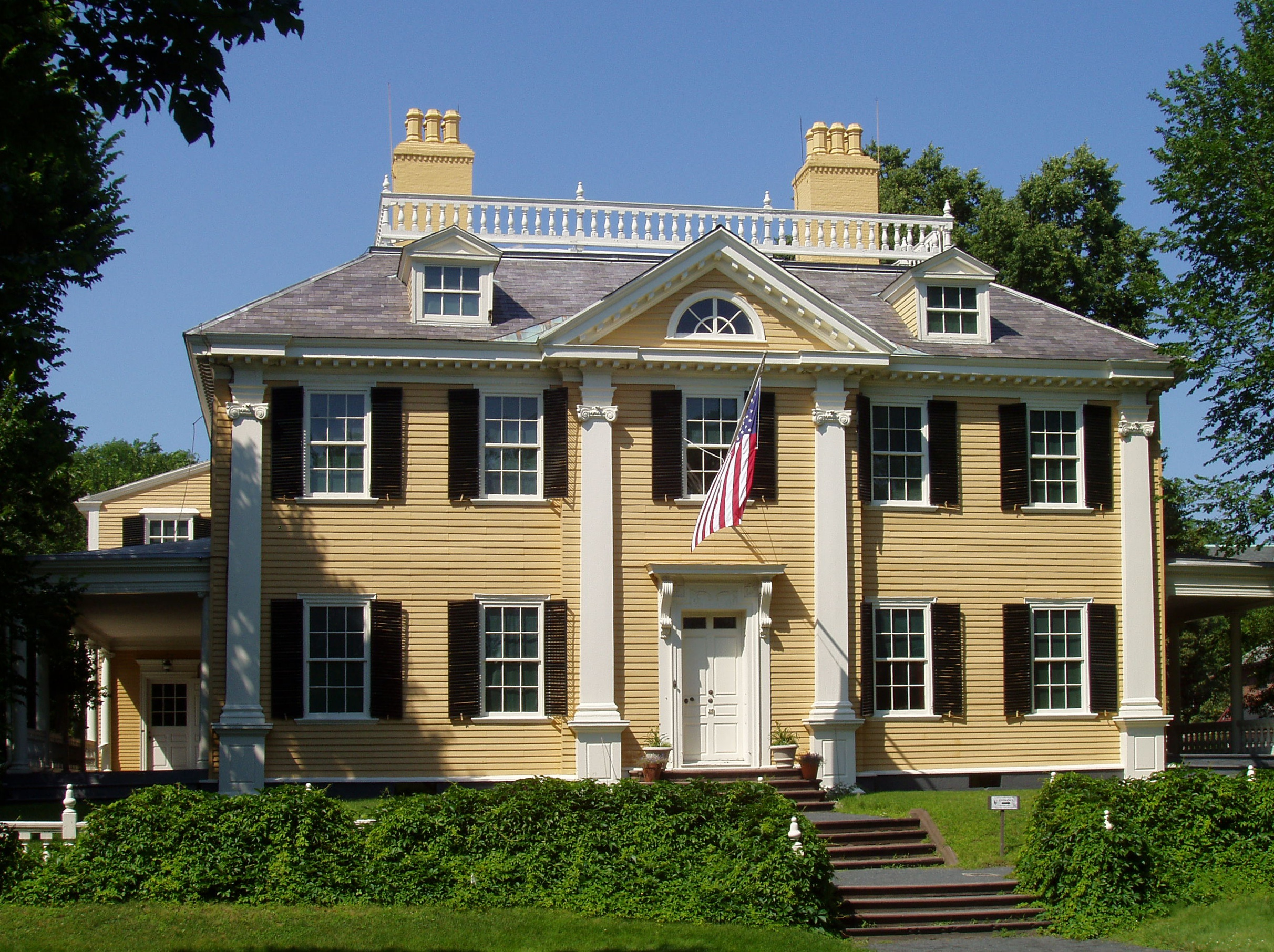
Home built by John Vassall Jr., in Cambridge, Massachusetts, with wealth gained through slave labor. The mansion at 105 Brattle Street was headquarters to Washington in the Revolution and, later, home to the poet Longfellow.

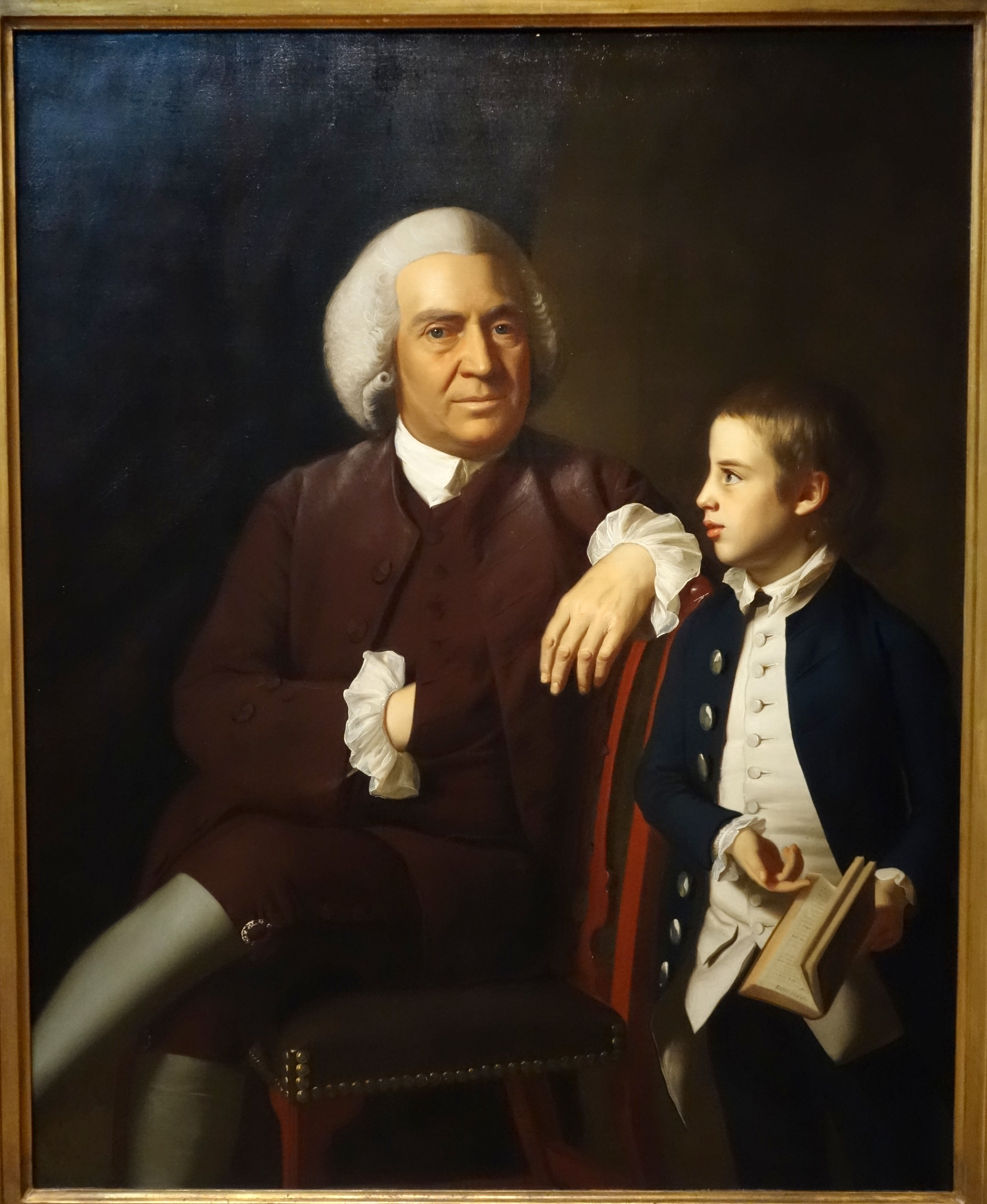
William Vassall and His Son Leonard (c. 1771), John Singleton Copley, oil on canvas, DeYoung Museum. William Vassall (1715–1800) invested wealth from his Jamaican slave-labor plantation in New England. He was a proprietor of Vassalboro, Maine, which bears his name.

Like their father, Vassall children John and Anna were “early to take advantage of the opportunity of settling in the West Indies and North America, … amassing great fortunes from slavery.” One 2004 history of Virginia slavery cites the siblings, noting that by the mid-1700s, slave purchases “commonly took place in counties that attracted intercolonial immigrants," and they "often involved individuals, like Anna Vassal Ware," who moved from Barbados to Virginia, and her brother John, who lived in Jamaica. “These migrations and the economic and familial ties they cemented lay at the core of Virginia’s slave trade."

In 1669, John Vassall was granted 1,000 acres near the mouth of the Black River in St. Elizabeth, Jamaica, where he bought an additional 4,000 acres in 1672. The Vassalls continued to expand their ownership of people and land in Jamaica. Records held by the Center for the Study of the Legacy of British Slavery show that between 1714 and 1827, 27 Vassall descendants owned eighteen slave-labor plantations spread across parishes in western Jamaica. Vassalls owned ten plantations in St. Elizabeth: Content, Lower Works Pen, Luana, Middle Quarter, Middlesex Pen, New Savannah, Pond Pen, Top Hill Pen, Vineyard Pen, and Y.S; three plantations in Hanover: Abingdon, Green Island River, and Newfound River; two plantations in Westmoreland: Friendship and Greenwich, and Sweet River Pen; and one plantation in St. James: Seven Rivers.

Wills probated between 1714 and 1827 identified 3,282 individuals enslaved by the Vassalls. Following the passage of the Slavery Abolition Act 1833 and the subsequent Slave Compensation Act 1837, Vassall descendants claimed full compensation for six properties and 583 enslaved people. That data does not include those enslaved during the Vassalls first 66 years as planters, nor does it fully account for those enslaved by the family in Jamaica or in their homes overseas. Thus, in addition to the documented 3,865 men, women, and children enslaved by William Vassall and his descendants, hundreds more remain uncounted and unknown.

Plantation wealth made William Vassall's descendants prominent in the colony he had helped found.

Grandson Leonard Vassall (1678–1737) commissioned the building of a mansion in Quincy, Massachusetts. Presidents John Adams and John Quincy Adams later made Peacefield their home. He “ostentatiously” paid his son Lewis's Harvard tuition with a cask of sugar produced by slave labor “worth more than the entirety of many of his classmates’ dues,” and in 1728, he posted the bond for the purchase of land to build Trinity Church, Boston. Leonard Vassall's slave ownership at probate was 131 people, including 51 children; 73% of his total wealth was the value of the people he enslaved.

Great-grandson Henry Vassall (1721-1769) bought a Cambridge mansion from his older brother John and married Penelope Royall. The enslaved workers on the Royall's Antiguan plantation “created wealth that made possible the founding of Harvard Law School.” Vassall and Royall enslaved at least 7 on their "Tory Row" property, an unusually high number for a single New England home, though the "names of nearly a score" enslaved people appear in household records. Henry Vassall “squandered much of his inheritance on this opulent property and accompanying lavish lifestyle.” He died insolvent in 1769. The Henry and Penelope Vassall house at 94 Brattle Street, Cambridge, is now one of the Commonwealth's historic homes.

Great-grandson William Vassall (1715–1800) differed from his siblings in expressing doubts about the “Christian morality” of keeping a “‘great number of slaves on his West Indian plantations.’” He wrote to Bishop Joseph Butler for advice and accepted his assurance that slavery was Biblically justified. William Vassall invested the wealth gleaned from his Jamaican plantations throughout New England, including Kennebec County, Maine, where the town of Vassalboro bears his name. William Vassall fled to England during the Revolution, where he died, having spent many years arguing for "compensation for what he deemed the illegal confiscation of his properties in Massachusetts and Rhode Island."

Great-grandson Col. John Vassall (1713–1747) was Cambridge’s representative to the Massachusetts legislature in 1740 and 1747. Col. Vassall owned Jamaica’s Lower Works Pen and Newfound plantations. At the time of his death, he enslaved 1,167 people, including 270 children.

Great-great grandson John Vassall II (1738-1797) was nine when he inherited his father’s vast holdings in people and property. At 21, the younger John Vassall commissioned what would become Cambridge’s “largest and most elegant estate," a grand home on 90 acres where he lived in “princely style” with his wife, Elizabeth Oliver, daughter of Antiguan plantation owners. The couple enslaved 7 people in their home, reflecting both “the enormous wealth of the white Vassalls” and their “commitment” to the institution of slavery. After the loyalist Vassalls fled their mansion in 1774, Gen. George Washington used it as his Cambridge headquarters, and the poet Henry Wadsworth Longfellow later made it his home. The U.S. National Park Service now owns the Georgian-style home at 105 Brattle Street. William Vassall's descendants owned the Newfound River plantation until Great Britain abolished slavery. Each year, they enslaved an average of 177 people.

Great-great-granddaughter Elizabeth Vassall (b. 1739) also married into the wealthy Oliver family. Her husband Thomas Oliver was the last Lieutenant Governor of colonial Massachusetts and the son of Antiguan planters. The couple enslaved 11 on their Cambridge estate, Elmwood, which now serves as the home of Harvard's president. Loyalists, they fled the country and later petitioned the British government for £480 in compensation for the “valuable slaves” they left behind.

Anthony (“Tony”) Vassall (1713?-1811), his wife Cuba, and their children were enslaved by Henry Vassall and wife Penelope Royall. When Henry Vassall's widow and John Vassall II fled the colony with other Loyalists in 1774, Tony and his family lived in a building on John II's estate, farming about 1.5 acres for sustenance. When the sale of confiscated loyalist properties was completed in 1780, Tony Vassall, then about 67, petitioned the legislature to have his squatter's rights confirmed by title. The petition was denied, but Vassall gained success with a second petition in 1781. The legislature ordered that “out of the proceeds of the John Vassall sales Tony should be paid the sum of £12, and the same amount annually thereafter from the public funds.” His was the “first petition for slavery compensation granted after American independence.” His success “inspired other suits," which contributed to the abolition of slavery in Massachusetts.

Darby Vassall (c. 1769–1861), son of Tony and Cuba, became a renowned activist in greater Boston's Black community. He and his brother Cyrus were "among the founders of the African Society, a mutual aid society started in 1796. Darby signed a local petition against [the] Fugitive Slave Act in 1861", and both brothers "added their names to a petition created by Primus Hall to build a Black school in Beacon Hill in 1812." On 23 August 1825, Darby Vassall was "second Vice President of a banquet to celebrate the anniversary of Haitian independence, and offered this toast: "Freedom—May the freedom of Haiti be a glorious harbinger of the time when the color of a man shall no longer be a pretext for depriving him of his liberty." His 15 October 1861 funeral was widely covered. A Philadelphia paper reported that the 92-year-old was "well known. He was born in the house in Cambridge distinguished as WASHINGTON’S Head-quarters. He was the oldest member of the Church in Brattle square, (Boston), and was universally respected for his general intelligence and excellent character."

In their 1778 claim to the British government, loyalist Vassalls valued Darby Vassall at £200. "Listed at comparable monetary value were the Vassalls’ livestock," including two yoke oxen and a bay mare.

== Works cited ==
1643 List of Men Able to Bear Arms, Records of the Plymouth Colony, vol. 1 (163-1651), p. 191.

Allen, Francis Olcott. "Vassall." New England Historical and Genealogical Register, vol. 51, 1897, p. 152.

Allen, Gillian. “Vassall Devon/Jamaica Connections.” 17 Oct 2020.

Anderson, Robert Charles, et al. “William Vassall.” The Great Migration Begins: Immigrants to New England, 1620-1633, Volumes 1-3. New England Historical and Genealogical Society, 1996-2011, p. 1871-75.

Andrews, Charles M. T he Fathers of New England: A Chronicle of the Puritan Commonwealths. Project Gutenberg Ebook.

Aspinwall, William. “William Vassall no Factionist." Proceedings of the Massachusetts Historical Society, 1862-1863, vol 6, p. 470-491.

Bates, Ella Turner. “First Parish Church.” Old Scituate. Chief Justice Cushing Chapter, Daughters of the American Revolution, 1921, p. 162-69.

Bell, J.L. George Washington's Headquarters and Home: A Historic Resource Study. National Park Service, 29 February 2012.

Blessing 1635 passenger list. Packratpro.com

Brown, B. Katherine. “Freemanship in Puritan Massachusetts.” The American Historical Review, vol 59, no. 4 (July 1954), p. 865-883.

Calder, Charles Maclear. John Vassall and his Descendants. Stephen Austin and Sons, 1921.

Carpenter, Dorothy. William Vassall and Dissent in Early Massachusetts. First Parish Norwell, 2004.

Child, John, and William Vassall. New-England’s Jonas cast up at London (1647). Ed. W.T.R. Marvin. William Parsons Lunt, 1869. Library of Congress, item 01019982.

Cobb, Sanford. The Rise of Religious Liberty in America. MacMillan, 1902.

Coquillette, Daniel R. "Radical Lawmakers in Colonial Massachusetts: The `Countenance of Authoritie' and the Lawes and Libertyes." New England Quarterly 67 (1994), p. 179-206.

Dale, Elizabeth. Debating – and Creating – Authority: The Failure of a Constitutional Ideal in Massachusetts Bay, 1629-1649. Ebook, 2018.

Deane, Samuel. History of Scituate, Massachusetts from Its First Settlement to 1831. James Loring, 1831.

Dudley, Thomas. “To the Right Honourable, My very good Lady, The Lady Bridget, Countess of Lincoln,” 28 March 1631. In Royster, p. 5-20.

Evans, Charles. “Oaths of Allegiance in Colonial New England.” American Antiquarian Society, October 1921, p 377-438.

Fewkes, RM. “Lessons from 350 Years of History.” First Parish, Norwell, Massachusetts, 2 February 1992.

Field, Jonathan Beecher. Errands into the Metropolis: New England Dissidents in Revolutionary London. Dartmouth, 2009.

Fiske, John. The Beginnings of New England. Houghton Mifflin, 1898.

Games, Alison. Migration and the Origins of the English Atlantic World. Harvard UP, 1999.

Gant, Amy. Religion, Politics, Print and Public Discourse in Mid-Seventeenth Century England and New England: Two Studies. M.A. Thesis, Vanderbilt, 2011.

Gorton, Adelos. The Life and Times of Samuel Gorton. Higginson, 1907.

Gragg, Larry D. “The Early New England-Barbados Trade.” Historical Journal of Massachusetts, Summer 1989, p. 177-200.

Gragg, Larry D. Englishmen Transplanted: The English Colonization of Barbados, 1627-1660. Oxford UP, 2003.

Harris, Edward Doubleday. "The Vassalls of New England." New England Historical and Genealogical Register, vol. 17, 1863, p. 56-57.

Hatfield, April Lee. Atlantic Virginia: Intercolonial Relations in the Seventeenth Century. University of Pennsylvania Press, 2004.

Howe, Daniel Wait. The Puritan Republic of the Massachusetts Bay in New England. Bowen-Merrill, 1899.

Kittredge, George L. “Dr. Robert Child the Remonstrant.” Transactions of the Colonial Society of Massachusetts, March 1919.

Marvin, William T.R. Introduction. New-England’s Jonas cast up at London. William Parsons Lunt, 1869, p. v-lii.

Moody, Robert E. “Thomas Gorges, Proprietary Governor of Maine, 1640-1643.” Proceedings of the Massachusetts Historical Society, 3rd series, vol 75, 1963, p. 10-26.

Morris, Richard B. “Massachusetts and the Common Law: The Declaration of 1646.” The American Historical Review, vol. 31, no. 3 (Apr. 1926), p. 443- 453.

Newell, Margaret E. “Robert Child and the Entrepreneurial Vision: Economy and Ideology in Early New England. The New England Quarterly, vol. 68, no. 2 (June 1995), p. 223-256.

Northend, William Dummer. The Bay Colony: A Civil, Religious and Social History of the Massachusetts Colony.. Estes and Lauriat, 1896.

Otis, Amos. Genealogical Notes of Barnstable, 1888-90. Ed CF Swift. Genealogical Publishing, 1979.

Pennington, Edgar Legare. “Anglican Beginnings in Massachusetts.” Historical Magazine of the Protestant Episcopal Church, vol. 10, no. 3 (Sept 1941), p 242-89.

Porter, Bertha. “John Vassall.” [Entry includes William Vassall.] Dictionary of National Biography, 1885-1900, vol. 58, p. 155-56.

Power, Mary L.F. “The Second Church of Christ in Scituate, now the First Parish Church of Norwell.” Old Scituate. Chief Justice Cushing Chapter, Daughters of the American Revolution, 1921, p. 169-76.

---. “The Vassalls at Belle House Neck.” Old Scituate. Chief Justice Cushing Chapter, Daughters of the American Revolution, 1921, p. 30-35.

Pratt, Harvey Hunter. The Early Planters of Scituate. Scituate Historical Society, 1929.

Rice, Grantland S. The Transformation of Authorship in America. U of Chicago Press, 1997.

Rothbard, Murray N. Conceived in Liberty. Ludwig von Mises Institute, 1999.

Royster, Paul, ed. Massachusetts: or the first Planters of New-England, The End and Manner of their coming thither, and Abode there: In several EPISTLES (1696). Joshua Scottow Papers 7, University of Nebraska-Lincoln online edition, p. 60-61.

Sheriden, Richard B. The British Sugar Planters and the Atlantic World, 1763-1775. University Presses of Florida, 1973.

Smith, S.D. Slavery, Family, and Gentry in the British Atlantic. Cambridge University, 2006.

Stratton, Eugene Aubrey. Plymouth Colony, Its History and People, 1620-1691. Ancestry Publishing, 1986.

Thomas, Hugh. The Slave Trade: The Story of the Atlantic Slave Trade: 1440-1870. Simon and Schuster, 1997.

Turner, John G. They Knew They Were Pilgrims: Plymouth Colony and the Contest for American Liberty. Yale UP, 2020.

Vassall Profiles and Legacies. Center for the Study of the Legacy of British Slavery, University College London.

Wall, Robert E., Jr. Massachusetts Bay: The Crucial Decade, 1640-1650. Yale UP, 1972.

Walsh, Mark A. “Radical Lawmakers Appendix: An Annotated Bibliography of Primary Sources.” New England Quarterly, vol. 67, 1994, p. 207-11.

Waters, H.F. “Genealogical Gleanings in England.” The New England Historical and Genealogical Register, vol. 15 (1857), p. 105+.

Weeden, William Babcock. Three Commonwealths, Massachusetts, Connecticut and Rhode Island: Their Early Development. C. Hamilton, 1903.

Whitmore, William Henry. The Massachusetts Civil List for the Colonial and Provincial Periods, 1630-1774. J. Munsell, 1870.

Winthrop, John. Winthrop’s Journal, 1630-1649. Ed. James Kendall Hosmer, Scribner's, 1908.

Young, Alexander. Chronicles of the First Planters of the Colony of Massachusetts Bay, from 1623 to 1636. Little and Brown, 1846.
