= Tony Torn =

American actor, director, and producer

- Born: Anthony Sarrazin Torn; 1965 (age 60–61); New York City, U.S.
- Occupations: Actor, director, producer
- Years active: 1985–present
- Spouse: Lee Ann Brown (m. 2002)
- Parents: Rip Torn; Geraldine Page

Anthony Torn (born 1965) is an American actor, director, and producer. He has made extensive appearances across film, television, and theatre. Torn has long been involved in the New York experimental theater community, having worked with avant-garde directors Richard Foreman and Reza Abdoh, and served as one of the founding directors of long-running New York City performance community Reverend Billy and the Church of Stop Shopping. Torn has appeared in episodes of the television shows Law & Order (1997–2009), 30 Rock (2009), The Good Wife (2010), Jason and Shirley (2015), The Blacklist (2018), Teenage Bounty Hunters (2020), and Law & Order: Special Victims Unit (2021).

== Career ==
Torn has an extensive theatrical career, having performed at the Signature Theatre Off-Broadway, Classic Stage Company, American Repertory Theater, La MaMa, and the Cort Theater on Broadway.

Described as "a stalwart of the experimental theater" by Jesse Green, Torn has worked extensively with experimental playwrights, directors, and filmmakers Reza Abdoh and Richard Foreman, and has even been called a "crucial muse" to the latter. He appeared in Abdoh's Father Was A Peculiar Man (1990), The Law of Remains (1991), The Blind Owl (1992), Tight Right White (1993), and Quotations From a Ruined City (1994), as well as Foreman's The Universe (1996), Paradise Hotel (1999), and Now That Communism Is Dead My Life Feels Empty! (2004). Torn also collaborated with lead performer William Talen to develop the character of Reverend Billy for the Stop Shopping Choir.

In 2014, Torn co-directed and starred in Ubu Sings Ubu, an immersive performance adapting Ubu Roi and incorporating the music of avant-garage rock band Pere Ubu.

In 2019, Torn played a fictionalized version of performance artist Paul Swan with avant-garde theatre company The Civilians.

In 2024, Torn played the Roaring Twenties Faust-analogue J. G. Conwell in the original cast of Off-Broadway site-specific immersive theater production Life and Trust, created by the producers of Sleep No More.

In 2024, Torn directed the United States premiere of The Whole of Time, "a feminist reworking of The Glass Menagerie by Argentinian playwright Romina Paula" which was staged at The Brick Theater in 2025. The Whole of Time was nominated for a Drama Desk Award for Outstanding Adaptation, extended multiple times, and positively reviewed, with The New Yorker singling out Torn's "beautifu[l]" direction.

== Personal life ==
He is the son of actors Rip Torn and Geraldine Page.

== Filmography ==
Key
†	Denotes films that have not yet been released

Film roles
Year	Title	Role	Note
1985	The Trip to Bountiful	Twin	
1989	Wicked Stepmother	Street Hustler (as Anthony Torn)	
1992	The Blind Owl		
1997	Chasing Amy	Cashier	
1997	Ill Gotten Gains	The Vet	
1998	Claudine's Return	Roscoe Measles	
1998	Whatever	Mr. Stanley	
2004	The Stepford Wives	Additional Stepford Husband	
2007	The Grand Inquisitor	Bill	Short film, Torn also directed
2006	The Convention	Gordon	Short film, Torn also directed and produced
2008	Lucky Days	Bobby	Also co-directed
2010	All Good Things	Theater Manager (as Anthony Torn)	
2012	Unchained Melody	Wolf (voice)	Short film
2014	The Disinherited	Pofiry	
2015	Jason and Shirley	Saul	
2015	My Milonga	Spiro	Short film, also produced
2016	Custody	Byron	
2016	Idee Fixe		Short film
2017	The Wilde Wedding	Store Owner	
2019	The Assistant	Boss	
2021	Buried	Brian	Short film
2021	Bobbin	Tom	Short film
2023	A Simple Stone	Tony	Short film
2024	Exhibiting Forgiveness	Arthur	
2024	Invention	Tony	
2016	The Dutchman	Janitor	
2025	Late Fame	Paulie	

Television roles
Year	Title	Role	Notes
1997–2009	Law & Order	Dr. Voss, Court Clerk #2, Remy	3 episodes
2009	30 Rock	Bertram Geiss	Episode: "Sun Tea"
2010	The Good Wife	Professor Dunn	Episode: "Doubt"
2014	Good Medicine	Thomas Jefferson	Episode: "Atari"
2016	Banker Madness!	Milton	Recurring
2016	BrainDead	Scientist Man	Episode: "Playing Politics"
2018	The Blacklist	The Toymaker	Episode: "The Invisible Hand"
2020	Teenage Bounty Hunters	Sister Jim	Episode: "This Must Be How Dumb Kids Feel"
2021	Law & Order: Special Victims Unit	Larry Hughes	Episode: "Turn Me On Take Me Private"
2023	Staging Film	John Sleight	Episode: "The Bad Infinity"
2025	FBI: Most Wanted	Lev Sussman	Episode: "Ars Moriendi"

== Theater (partial) ==
- The Picture (2000, chashama) (The Large Gentleman)
- The Tempest (2008, Classic Stage Company) (Trinculo)
- Breakfast at Tiffany's (2013, Cort Theatre) (Rusty Trawler)
- Ubu Sings Ubu (2014, Abrons Art Center) (Pa Ubu)
- The Tempest (2014, La MaMa) (Stephano)
- Venus (2017, The Signature Theatre) (Cyclops/Mother)
- Paul Swan Is Dead and Gone (2019, Torn Page) (Paul Swan)
- King Lear (2024, La MaMa) (Lear/Oswald)
