= Constance Hopkins =

Mayflower passenger

Constance Hopkins (baptized May 11, 1606 – October 1677), also sometimes listed as Constanta, was a passenger on the Mayflower in 1620.

== Biography ==
Hopkins was probably born in Hursley, England since her baptism record is there along with older sister and younger brother. Constance was the second daughter of Stephen Hopkins, by his first wife, Mary. Some believe she was named in honor of Constance (Marline) Hopkins. Constance, at the age of fourteen, along with her father and his second wife Elizabeth (Fisher), accompanied by brother Giles, half-sister Damaris as well as two servants by the name of Edward Doty and Edward Lester were passengers on the Mayflower on its journey to the New World in 1620. Along the way her half-brother Oceanus was born, the only child born on the Mayflower journey.

Her memorial plaque, in the Cove Burying Ground in Eastham, Massachusetts, placed in 1966 by descendants, states in part "Wife of Nicholas Snow, Eastham's first town clerk 1646 – 1662". We do not know the exact location of their graves.

Constance married Nicholas Snow sometime before the Division of Cattle which occurred May 22, 1627. Nicholas came to Plymouth on board the ship Anne in 1623 and was made a freeman at Plymouth in 1633. The inventory of Nicholas Snow's estate made at his death lists a wide variety of cooper's and carpenter's tools; this may indicate his trade. He was a town clerk at Eastham and held several other local government offices.

According to Governor William Bradford, who wrote between March 6 and April 3, 1651:

"Constance is married, and has 12 children all of them living, and one of them married".

=== Children of Constance and Nicholas Snow ===
- Mark b. Plymouth, May 9, 1628 married (1) Ann Cooke daughter of Josiah Cooke, married (2) Jane Prence, daughter of Thomas Prence
- Mary b. Plymouth, 1630, married Thomas Paine
- Sarah b. Plymouth, 1632, married William Walker, who came to the colony on the ship Elizabeth, in 1635
- Joseph b. Plymouth, 1634, Joseph Snow married Mary Higgins she was the daughter of Richard and Mary (Yates) Higgins
- Stephen b. Plymouth, 1636, married (1) Susanna Rogers (Deane), daughter of Stephen Deane, married (2) Mary Bigford (Cottle, Bickford), daughter of Edward Cottle and Judith, last name unknown
- John b. Plymouth, December 11, 1638, married Mary Smalley, a twin daughter of John Smalley and Ann Walden
- Elizabeth b. Plymouth, 1640, married Thomas Rogers, son of Joseph Rogers, the son of Pilgrim, Thomas Rogers
- Jabez b. Plymouth, 1642, married Elizabeth, last name unknown, she was possibly the daughter of Ralph Smith
- Ruth b. Plymouth, 1644, married Lieutenant John Cole Sr., son of Daniel Cole and Ruth Chester

Josiah Paine, a Town Clerk and historian of Harwich wrote "Nicholas and Constance had a dau. named for her mother who was the first wife of Daniel Doane of Eastham…"

- Constance (unproved), b. Plymouth, married Daniel Doane The name Constance Snow (child of Nicholas Snow and Constance Hopkins Snow), was seen by the town clerk Josia Paine listed on proper documents and testified to this in a town meeting. This was 100 years after Constance Hopkins Snow had lived. A fire burned down the building retaining these documents, and the town clerk Josiah Paine was questioned about the Snows lineage. The Doane Family and Lineage accept Constance Snow Doane as a descendant of the Stephen Hopkins family. The only Society that does not accept the Constables' testimony is the Mayflower Society. As far as the Doanes are concerned, Constance Snow was the granddaughter of Stephen Hopkins who was on the Mayflower along with other family members including Constance Hopkins, Constance Snow's mother.
- Two unknown children

Constance is the 10-times great-grandmother of actress Allison Janney.

== Legacy ==
A beaver hat, reputed to have belonged to Constance Hopkins, is in the collection of the Pilgrim Hall museum in Plymouth.

== Fictional representations ==
Constance Hopkins is the central character in Patricia Clapp's young adult novel Constance: A Story of Early Plymouth. Clapp herself was a descendant of Hopkins.

== See also ==
- Pilgrim (Plymouth Colony)
- Jamestown, Virginia
- First Families of Virginia
