= Jerico DeAngelo =

Performance artist and musician

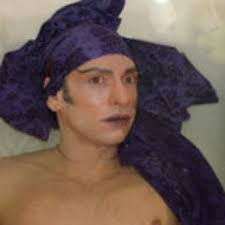
- Jerico DeAngelo as God of Death and Resurrection
- Born: Anthony Joseph Eisenschmidt; January 22, 1967 (age 59); New York
- Other names: Jerico DeAngelo, Jerico of the Angels, Anthony Christian, Lazir, Aison, OsiriStar, Eis'n, Jerico Di Angelo.
- Occupations: Multimedia performance artist, actor, singer, songwriter, composer, and art-video maker
- Years active: 1975–present
- Known for: First to incorporate human blood-drinking ritual into performance art
- Style: Contemporary Romanticism, New Age, Symbolism, Ritual Art

Anthony Joseph Eisenschmidt (born January 22, 1967), known professionally as Jerico DeAngelo and Jerico of the Angels, is an American multimedia performance artist, singer, songwriter, composer, actor, and art-video maker. He is noted for his contributions to the New York City art world for being among the first to incorporate human blood-drinking during performance art with his original music recordings.

DeAngelo is known for his large scale multimedia productions in Los Angeles and New York City, with personal themes incorporating occult and mystic symbolism. His performance artwork, Into Infinity (1995-1997), incorporated death cult resurrection and sex magic rituals with original song recordings. DeAngelo's controversial work garnered cover photos and stories in The New York Times, the Daily News, New York Post, CNN, and CNBC, among a firestorm of world-wide printed and televised news-media.

DeAngelo's songwriting career includes a Grammy Award-nominated credit for his song "Aim Your Arrow High" (Album: To a Higher Place, Artist: Tramaine Hawkins, Columbia Records, 1994).

== Early life and career ==
Jerico DeAngelo was born Anthony Joseph Eisenschmidt in the Finger Lakes region of New York State. DeAngelo's parents recognized that he was musically gifted and encouraged the development of his many artistic talents.

He loved being on stage and had a natural flair for performing. In his early teens, he was cast in various stage roles in professional theaters in surrounding cities where he lived.

DeAngelo spent much of his childhood in practice and rehearsals. He was classically trained and learned to play five different instruments. During lunch hour in school, DeAngelo spent time alone practicing piano and writing music. He was composing by the time he was 8, and he had his first copyrighted work at age 11.

DeAngelo would go on to Purchase College, recognized for studies in performing arts. Leaving school, DeAngelo moved to Syracuse and then to Los Angeles, where his career began to form before finally moving to New York City. New York City is where his performance art incorporating occult symbolism developed further.

DeAngelo credits his symbolic influences in art to his need to his own highly personal experiences exploring myth and spirituality.

== Vampire mythos and Into Infinity ==
DeAngelo was described in a New York Times article, by journalist Frank Bruni, as having defined "vampirism not as a predatory need for human blood but as a poetic metaphor for the way in which all human beings feed off each other in order to exist."

In the 1996 New York Times article, DeAngelo is said to have immersed himself in the vampire mythos to discover, through art and ritual, occult mysteries of immortality–– partly as an antidote to feeling helpless against the AIDS pandemic in a time when so many were still dying. He claims to have had an aversion to sunlight, and he slept in an Egyptian style sarcophagus designed and constructed by the contemporary artists Janusz Gilewicz and Kaori Kayo.

The gold and gem-studded sarcophagus sculpture DeAngelo slept in was the same one he was carried in onto the stage of New York City venues, including the Limelight and the Bank. Gilewicz and Kayo depicted DeAngelo's face as the mask on the front cover of the sarcophagus, which was constructed of papier-mâché made of multiple clippings of the obituary of the academic vampirologist Dr. Stephan Kaplan. Gilewicz and Kayo also designed the art on DeAngelo's Into Infinity CD cover, and they projected slides of their psychedelic transcendental paintings against DeAngelo's nude body both on stage and for the Japanese photographer, Yoshi Ono.

DeAngelo's Into Infinity multimedia performance art incorporated live musicians, dancers, paintings, videos, photography, and fashion design weaved with original song records. DeAngelo's music and song recording element of Into Infinity was created with the recruitment of over 50 writers, singers, musicians, producers, and other recording artists from around the world–– with most productions being performed and co-written with Scotland-born Laray Collins. The recording project was executive produced by Collins and DeAngelo.

== Stage, film, and video ==
DeAngelo's professional stage career began in his early teen youth in professional music theater and comedy productions. He became one of the original cast members of La Commedia Del Sangue: Vampyr Theatre (1992-1997, New York City).

DeAngelo's performance work and art direction have been shown—by his other name Anthony Christian— in video and film installation pieces as part of a touring exhibition of Reza Abdoh Radical Visions (Museum of Modern Art, New York City, 2018). DeAngelo performed in a series of experimental videos Abdoh created with video maker Adam Soch. The videos were incorporated into Reza Abdoh's plays debuting at LA Public Theater and shown in video installations in the 2018 MOMA PS1(New York City) exhibit. Over the years, DeAngelo has credited the avant-garde play director Reza Abdoh (1963-1995), for whom he befriended and worked with, for being one of the biggest influences on his artistic style.

DeAngelo's film acting history started under his earlier name, Anthony Christian, with the acting role of Jake in the cult classic feature and B-Horror film, Shock em' Dead (1991), which is one of the movies that launched the career of the cult movie queen Tracie Lords. Since then, he has appeared in hundreds of walk-on roles in major feature films and played himself on an Unsolved Mysteries episode about the disappearance of the Village Voice reporter, Susan Walsh ("Desperately Seeking Susan").

In Susan Walsh's real-life story, Walsh became a missing person while writing an article for the Village Voice about New York City vampires, in which DeAngelo was interviewed as one of the article's main subjects at the time. The case has remained unsolved.

== Songwriting and recording arts ==
As a songwriter and composer, DeAngelo's works include lyric and music contributions to the Grammy Award nominated album, To a Higher Place by gospel artist Tramaine Hawkins on Columbia Records (1994) with his original song "Aim Your Arrow High". The song was co-written with notable 20th-century songwriters Denise Rich, Michael O'Hara, and George Lyter. DeAngelo went on to release self-published albums as a songwriter, singer, and producer for his self-owned independent labels Everlasting Records and OsiriStar Records.

DeAngelo's alternative musical style is a fusion of numerous genres, including R&B, hip-hop, baroque classical, tribal house, alternative rock, gothic, experimental EDM, new age, dubstep, and pop. The eclectic mix of influences in DeAngelo's music and visual-arts earned him the label of an "artistic anarchist" by a reporter for Los Angeles Entertainment News. In the 2016 Entertainment News article, DeAngelo refused to label his style. He is quoted as saying, "Once I've defined myself, I've lost myself".

== Accolades ==
- Grammy Award nomination, song: "Aim Your Arrow High" (album: To A Higher Place, artist: Tramaine Hawkins, Columbia Records. 37th Annual Grammy Awards, Best Contemporary Soul Gospel Album Nominee)
- 2010 New York City Pill Award Winner, Octavia St. Laurent: Queen of the Underground, Best Documentary Montage (Jerico DeAngelo, Producer)

== Live performance art ==
Sources:

- Into Infinity, New York City, 1995-1997
- Flow Affair, New York City, 2010
- Undead A-Go-Go, New York City, 2014

== Video and filmography ==
- Sleeping with the Devil, Cast, 1990 (Museum of Modern Art, 2018)
- The Blind Owl, Asst. Art Director; 1992 (Museum of Modern Art, 2018)
- Train Project (Reza Abdoh, dir. 1991, Adam Soch, Camera)
- Shock em' Dead, Cast,1990
- Unsolved Mysteries, Cast, 1996
- Octavia St. Laurent, Queen of the Underground, Producer, 1993, (Winner 2010 Pill Award)

== Discography ==
Sources:

- Into Infinity (1995)
- Flow Affair (2010)
- SBLMNL MPCT (2013)
- Undead A-Go-Go (2014)
- Tame the Wind (2016)
- Aim Your Arrow High (Columbia Records, 1994, Grammy Award nominated album)
- Hot Planet (Progressive High Records, 1998)
- I Would Walk Through Fire (Wave / Sony Entertainment, 1998)
- Octavia St. Laurent, Queen of the Underground (OsiriStar Records, 2009)
