= Jessy Randall =

American poet (born 1969)

- Born: 1969 (age 56–57); Hornell, New York
- Education: Columbia University, University of North Carolina at Chapel Hill
- Occupations: Curator, librarian, poet
- Employer: Colorado College (2001–)

Jessy Randall (born 1969) is an American archivist and curator of special collections at Colorado College and a prolific writer. Her published poems, chapbooks, and novels have often focused on science and science fiction subjects. Her works have received multiple nominations and awards.

== Childhood and education ==
Born in Hornell, New York, United States, in 1969 and having grown up in Rochester, New York, Randall frequented her elementary school library and read through their entire collection of biographies on women. The book Dr. Elizabeth: The Story of the First Woman Doctor by Patricia Clapp first inspired her to become a doctor, though her goals changed when she found she had no interest in anatomical dissection. Instead, she became focused on research itself, often integrating Elizabeth Blackwell into her work. She attended Brighton High School in Rochester, New York, graduating in 1988. Randall went on to earn a Bachelor's of Arts in 1992 from Columbia University, where she studied with poet Kenneth Koch, and a Master's of Library Science from UNC-Chapel Hill in 1994, before becoming Colorado College's Curator of Special Collections for Tutt Library in 2001.

== Career ==
Randall began submitting science fiction related poems to Analog Science Fiction and Fact magazine in 2002, though the first piece ever selected for inclusion was Hertha Ayrton in 2019. This was created as the first poem in a series that was planned for book publication in the future. This resulted in 2022 when she began publishing a poetry book series on women in science, starting with Mathematics for Ladies that year and continuing in 2025 with The Path of Most Resistance. For Mathematics, the title was chosen as an English translation for a term used by the Soviet Union that referred to theoretical mathematics with no engineering involved. This was because engineering was considered a "masculine pursuit" and women were not allowed to practice it.

During her archivist work in 2017, Randall identified material in the library archives on Colorado College president William F. Slocum who sexually harassed and assaulted multiple women until his retirement in 1917. Details on these events had been lost until Randall found women's testimonials and other evidence that she added to a university blog she titled The Slocum Affair, resulting in student effort to rename buildings and other campus titles named after Slocum. She teaches the class The History and Future of the Book at Colorado College.

== Awards ==
Randall's 2007 book A Day in Boyland was a finalist in that year's Colorado Book Awards. The poem "Why I Had Children" was chosen from her 2012 book Injecting Dreams Into Cows by the Sydney, Australia government to be featured as one of nineteen poems on the side of the city's sanitation vehicles in 2013. For her poetry work, her piece Hertha Ayrton was a nominee for best poem in the 2019 Analog Science Fiction and Fact Analytical Laboratory awards and won second place for best poem in the 2024 awards for the work Ada Lovelace. In 2023, the British Science Fiction Association longlisted her book Mathematics for Ladies in the non-fiction category. Her 2025 book The Path of Most Resistance was placed on the honor list of five awardees for the 2025 Otherwise Award and was named one of the best works of poetry in 2025/2026 by Ms. Magazine.

== Bibliography ==
- — (1994). A Collection Analysis of the Rare Book Collection at the University of North Carolina at Chapel Hill: T.S. Eliot, Ezra Pound, Gertrude Stein. University of North Carolina at Chapel Hill. p. 120.
- —; Horowitz, Glenn; Barnes, Laura (1996). James Joyce: Books & Manuscripts. G. Horowitz Bookseller. p. 134.
- — (1999). Dorothy Surrenders. 2River. p. 22.
- — (2004). Slumber Party At The Aquarium. Unicorn Press. ISBN 9780877752530.
- — (2006). Because Mona Is In The Psychiatric Hospital. Pudding House Publications. p. 32. ISBN 9781589983793.
- — (2007). A Day in Boyland. Ghost Road Press. p. 86. ISBN 9780978945657.
- — (2007). Broken Heart Diet. Unicorn Press. ISBN 9780877752745.
- —; Hilberry, Jane (2009). Two Poems. Colorado College. p. 5.
- — (2009). The Wandora Unit. Ghost Road Press. p. 177. ISBN 9780981652580.
- —; Shapiro, Daniel M. (2011). Interruptions: Collaborative Poems. Pecan Grove Press. p. 56. ISBN 9781931247900.
- — (2012). Injecting Dreams Into Cows. Red Hen Press. p. 101. ISBN 9781597092302.
- —; Shapiro, Daniel M. (2014). What If You Were Happy for Just One Second: Instructional Diagrams. BOAAT Press. p. 36.
- — (2015). There Was An Old Woman. Unicorn Press. p. 66. ISBN 9780877759416.
- — (2016). Suicide Hotline Hold Music. Red Hen Press. p. 65. ISBN 9781597095556.
- — (2018). How to Tell If You Are Human: Diagram Poems. Pleiades Press. p. 74. ISBN 9780807169841.
- — (2022). Mathematics for Ladies: Poems on Women in Science. MIT Press. p. 144. ISBN 9781913380595.
- — (2025). The Path of Most Resistance: Poems on Women in Science. MIT Press. p. 128. ISBN 9781915983268.
