= Paul Doty =

Paul Doty may refer to:

- Paul Aaron Langevin Doty (1869–1937), American mechanical engineer
- Paul M. Doty (1920–2011), American professor of biochemistry at Harvard University
