= Bridge Road Cemetery =

Historic cemetery in Barnstable County, Massachusetts

- U.S. National Register of Historic Places
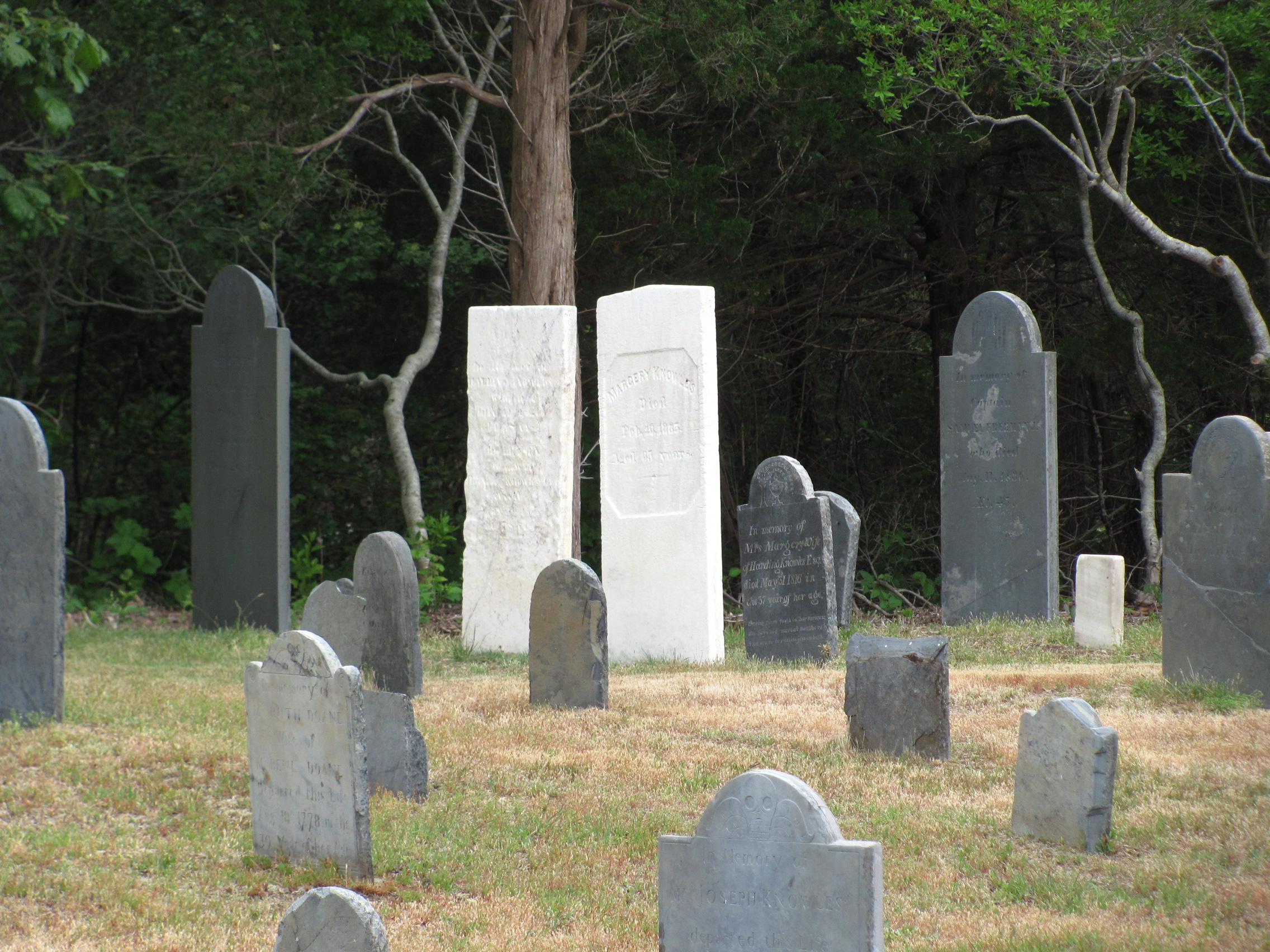
- Bridge Road Cemetery

- Location within Cape Cod Location within Massachusetts Location within the United States
- Location: Eastham, Massachusetts
- Coordinates: 41°49′33″N 69°58′51″W
- Area: 1.4 acres (0.57 ha)
- Architect: Bartlett Adams; Codner Family and Shop
- NRHP reference No.: 99000636
- Added to NRHP: May 27, 1999

The Bridge Road Cemetery is an historic cemetery on Bridge Road in Eastham, Massachusetts. It is a roughly 1.4-acre (0.57 ha) rectangular parcel on the west side of Bridge Road. The cemetery was established in 1720, and marks the location of the town's second meeting house. It was the second cemetery established in the town, after the Cove Burying Ground. The cemetery was in use from 1720 until the late 1880s; its earliest dated grave is marked 1754. Most of the burials took place between 1770 (when burials ended at Cove Burying Ground) and about 1830, when a new cemetery was laid out further north. There is a single 20th-century burial, dated 1933.

The cemetery was added to the National Register of Historic Places in 1999.

== See also ==
- National Register of Historic Places listings in Barnstable County, Massachusetts
