= Out of Mesopotamia =

2020 novel by Salar Abdoh

- Author: Salar Abdoh
- Language: English
- Subject: War
- Genre: Fiction
- Publisher: Akashic Books
- Publication date: September 1, 2020
- Media type: Print, e-book
- Pages: 240
- ISBN: 978-1-6177586-0-7

Out of Mesopotamia is a novel written by Salar Abdoh and published in 2020. The book is narrated by Saleh, a middle-aged Iranian journalist who moonlights as a writer for one of Iran's most popular TV shows but cannot keep himself away from the front lines in neighboring Iraq and Syria. There, the fight against the Islamic State is a proxy war, an existential battle, a declaration of faith, and, for some, a passing weekend affair.

It is Abdoh's second book for Akashic Books.

The book was reviewed by The New York Times and was one of eleven book recommendations from September 17, 2020.
