= The Picture (Ionesco play) =

1955 play by Eugène Ionesco

The Picture (French: Le Tableau) is a one-act play written by Eugène Ionesco and first published in Viridis Candela, the journal of the Collège de 'Pataphysique. The first performance was in Paris at the théâtre de la Huchette in October 1955, directed by Robert Postec and with Pierre Leproux, Pierre Chevallier, Tsilla Chelton, Maria Murano. A lesser-known work by Ionescu, there was an off-broadway production in 2000 starring Tony Torn based on a new English translation.

== Characters ==
- Le Gros Monsieur, the fat gentleman
- Alice, his sister
- Le Peintre, the painter
- La Voisine, the neighbor

== Plot ==
Le Gros Monsieur, aka the fat gentleman, is an irresistible, shrewd businessman. Le Peintre, aka The Painter, wants to sell him his painting. Initially, he wants 500,000 francs for it but in the end, the fat gentleman so savagely criticizes the painting, when he finally looks at it, that the Le Peintre agrees to pay the fat gentleman to store his painting. Alice, an old, ugly, and ill woman, is asked by her brother to lend him a hand. After the painter leaves, the brother-sister relationship is reversed and the meek creature becomes authoritarian and demanding, threatening her brother with her walking-stick. The fat gentleman obeys her but, when she is not looking, he grabs a gun and shoots. A miracle happens: Alice transforms into a beautiful maid. The old and ugly neighbor comes in, and she becomes beautiful too. The painter then comes back and turns into Prince Charming. The fat gentleman is the only one who remains fat and ugly, so he asks the audience to shoot him.

== Analysis ==
The play is subheaded Guignolade, that is a Guignol play, and Eugène Ionesco insists that it be played by Clowns in the most excessive, idiotic way. The characters shall not have any psychological depth, and the social content is merely accidental. According to the playwright, only extreme childish simplification can reveal the meaning of this farce, and it can become plausible when it is most improbable and idiotic. Idiocy can be such a revealing simplification for Ionesco.

The author's emphasis on the word "idiocy" is rather puzzling, but the contrast between the aesthetic and the utilitarian in the play is noteworthy, and as a classical theme, it seems to guarantee this humble play's lasting relevance.
