= Crab Orchard, Nebraska =

- Village
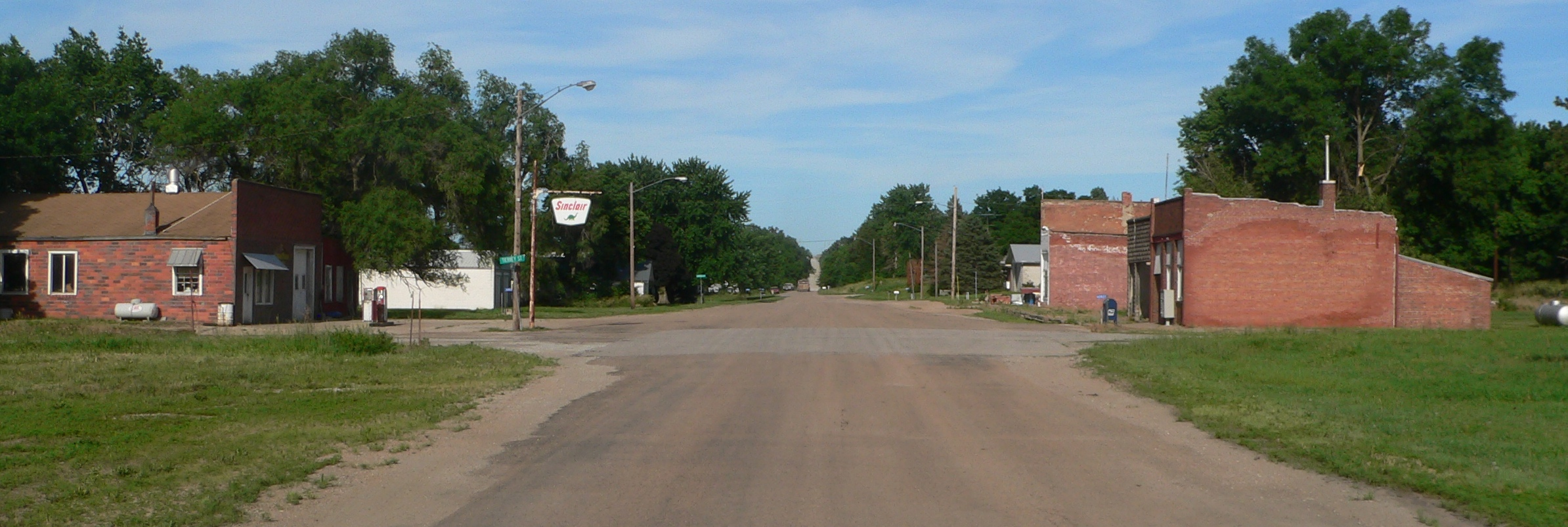
- Downtown Crab Orchard: 725 Rd

- Location of Crab Orchard, Nebraska
- Coordinates: 40°20′05″N 96°25′21″W
- Country: United States
- State: Nebraska
- County: Johnson

Area
  - Total: 0.16 sq mi (0.41 km^{2})
  - Land: 0.16 sq mi (0.41 km^{2})
  - Water: 0 sq mi (0.00 km^{2})
- Elevation: 1,283 ft (391 m)

Population (2020)
  - Total: 47
  - Estimate (2021): 48
  - Density: 300/sq mi (110/km^{2})
- Time zone: UTC-6 (Central (CST))
  - Summer (DST): UTC-5 (CDT)
- ZIP code: 68332
- Area code: 402
- FIPS code: 31-11055
- GNIS feature ID: 2398641

Crab Orchard is a village in Johnson County, Nebraska, United States. As of the 2020 census, the village population was 47.

== History ==
Crab Orchard was platted in 1883 when the Chicago, Burlington and Quincy Railroad was extended to that point. It was named from a grove of crabapple trees near the town site.

== Geography ==
According to the United States Census Bureau, the village has a total area of 0.16 square miles (0.41 km^{2}), all land.

== Demographics ==
Historical population
Census	Pop.	Note	%±
1890	229		—
1900	258		12.7%
1910	274		6.2%
1920	278		1.5%
1930	238		−14.4%
1940	218		−8.4%
1950	120		−45.0%
1960	103		−14.2%
1970	96		−6.8%
1980	82		−14.6%
1990	47		−42.7%
2000	49		4.3%
2010	38		−22.4%
2020	46		21.1%
2021 (est.)	48	▲	4.3%
U.S. Decennial Census

=== 2010 census ===
As of the census of 2010, there were 38 people, 21 households, and 8 families residing in the village. The population density was 237.5 inhabitants per square mile (91.7/km^{2}). There were 29 housing units at an average density of 181.3 per square mile (70.0/km^{2}). The racial makeup of the village was 100.0% White.

There were 21 households, of which 9.5% had children under the age of 18 living with them, 33.3% were married couples living together, 4.8% had a male householder with no wife present, and 61.9% were non-families. 52.4% of all households were made up of individuals, and 28.6% had someone living alone who was 65 years of age or older. The average household size was 1.81 and the average family size was 2.88.

The median age in the village was 55.5 years. 13.2% of residents were under the age of 18; 2.5% were between the ages of 18 and 24; 15.8% were from 25 to 44; 31.5% were from 45 to 64; and 36.8% were 65 years of age or older. The gender makeup of the village was 44.7% male and 55.3% female.

=== 2000 census ===
As of the census of 2000, there were 49 people, 25 households, and 11 families residing in the village. The population density was 295.6 inhabitants per square mile (114.1/km^{2}). There were 26 housing units at an average density of 156.8 per square mile (60.5/km^{2}). The racial makeup of the village was 97.96% White and 2.04% Asian.

There were 25 households, out of which 12.0% had children under the age of 18 living with them, 44.0% were married couples living together, and 56.0% were non-families. 48.0% of all households were made up of individuals, and 20.0% had someone living alone who was 65 years of age or older. The average household size was 1.96 and the average family size was 3.00.

In the village, the population was spread out, with 16.3% under the age of 18, 4.1% from 18 to 24, 18.4% from 25 to 44, 32.7% from 45 to 64, and 28.6% who were 65 years of age or older. The median age was 52 years. For every 100 females, there were 88.5 males. For every 100 females age 18 and over, there were 86.4 males.

The median income for a household in the village was $17,500, and the median income for a family was $30,625. Males had a median income of $30,417 versus $22,000 for females. The per capita income for the village was $11,627. There were no families and 4.9% of the population living below the poverty line, including no under eighteens and 13.3% of those over 64.

== Notable people ==
Roy Barcroft (1902–1969), an actor, was born in Crab Orchard.

Paul Swan (1883–1972), a dancer, artist, and camp icon, grew up in Crab Orchard.
