= Salar Abdoh =

Iranian novelist and essayist

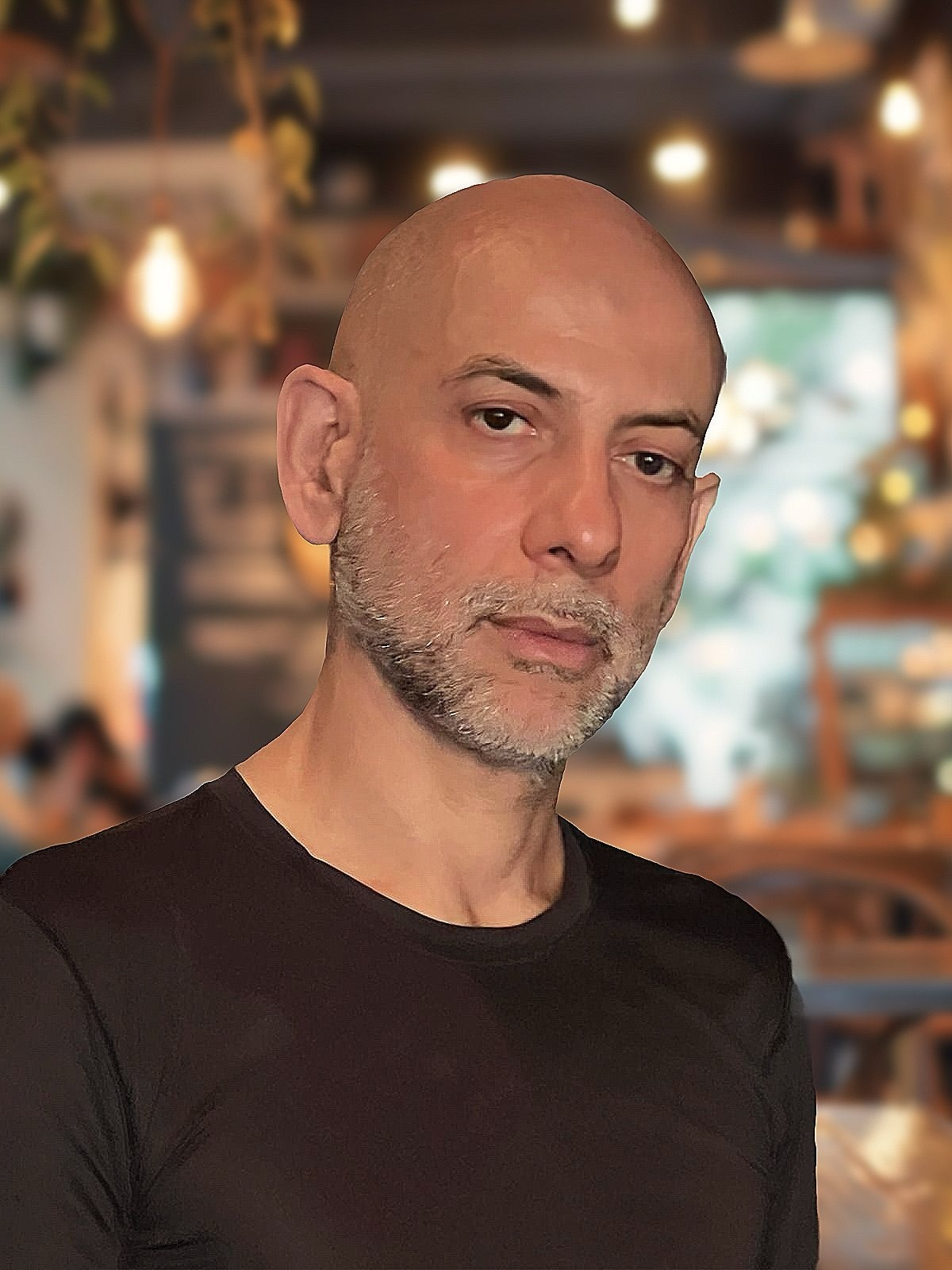

Salar Abdoh is a novelist and essayist. He is the author of the novels The Poet Game (2000), Opium (2004), Tehran At Twilight (2014), Out of Mesopotamia (2020), A Nearby Country Called Love (2023), and the editor and translator of the anthology Tehran Noir (2014). He is also a director of the program in Creative Writing at the City College of New York at the City University of New York.

== Early life and education ==
Salar Abdoh was born in Tehran, Iran and also spent some time in England. When Abdoh was fourteen his family was forced to leave Iran for the US. Abdoh earned an undergraduate degree from U.C. Berkeley and received a Master's from the City College of New York.

== Career ==
Abdoh's first novel, The Poet Game, focuses on a young agent sent by a top-secret Iranian government agency to infiltrate a group of Islamic extremists in New York in order to keep them from acts of terror that might draw the US into a war in the Middle East. Though the book was published in 2000, it received far greater attention following the September 11, 2001 attack on the World Trade Center. His second novel, Opium (2004) tells the story of a young American who used to work as a drug-runner along the Afghan/Iran border during the Soviet occupation of Afghanistan. Years later, living in New York and trying to keep a low profile, his past suddenly catches up with him as the US is gearing up to invade Afghanistan and Iraq. Abdoh's third novel, Tehran At Twilight, a literary thriller reminiscent of Graham Greene's The Quiet American, depicts the limits of friendship, and betrayal, in a time of war and after. Simultaneously with this novel, in 2014 Abdoh also edited and translated Tehran Noir, a collection of noir stories from various Iranian writers about Tehran. By 2020, with the Publication of Out of Mesopotamia, a war novel based on his own experiences in the wars of the Middle East (Iraq & Syria), Abdoh told the story of a journalist who, as the New York Times book review noted, "Torn between war and art ... chooses both." The novel was selected as a best book of 2020 by Publishers Weekly.

In his latest work, A Nearby Country Called Love, Abdoh shifted from themes of war to explore issues of sexuality, gender, queerness, oppression and masculinity in the modern age and especially in the Middle East. The New York Times described the book as “a complex portrait of interpersonal relationships.”The Washington Post said the book was“brutally poignant.”

Abdoh also co-wrote the play Quotations from a Ruined City with his older brother, the late world-famous avant-garde theater director, Reza Abdoh.
