= Stephen Hopkins (pilgrim) =

Mayflower passenger and English adventurer to Virginia and Plymouth colonies (d. 1644)

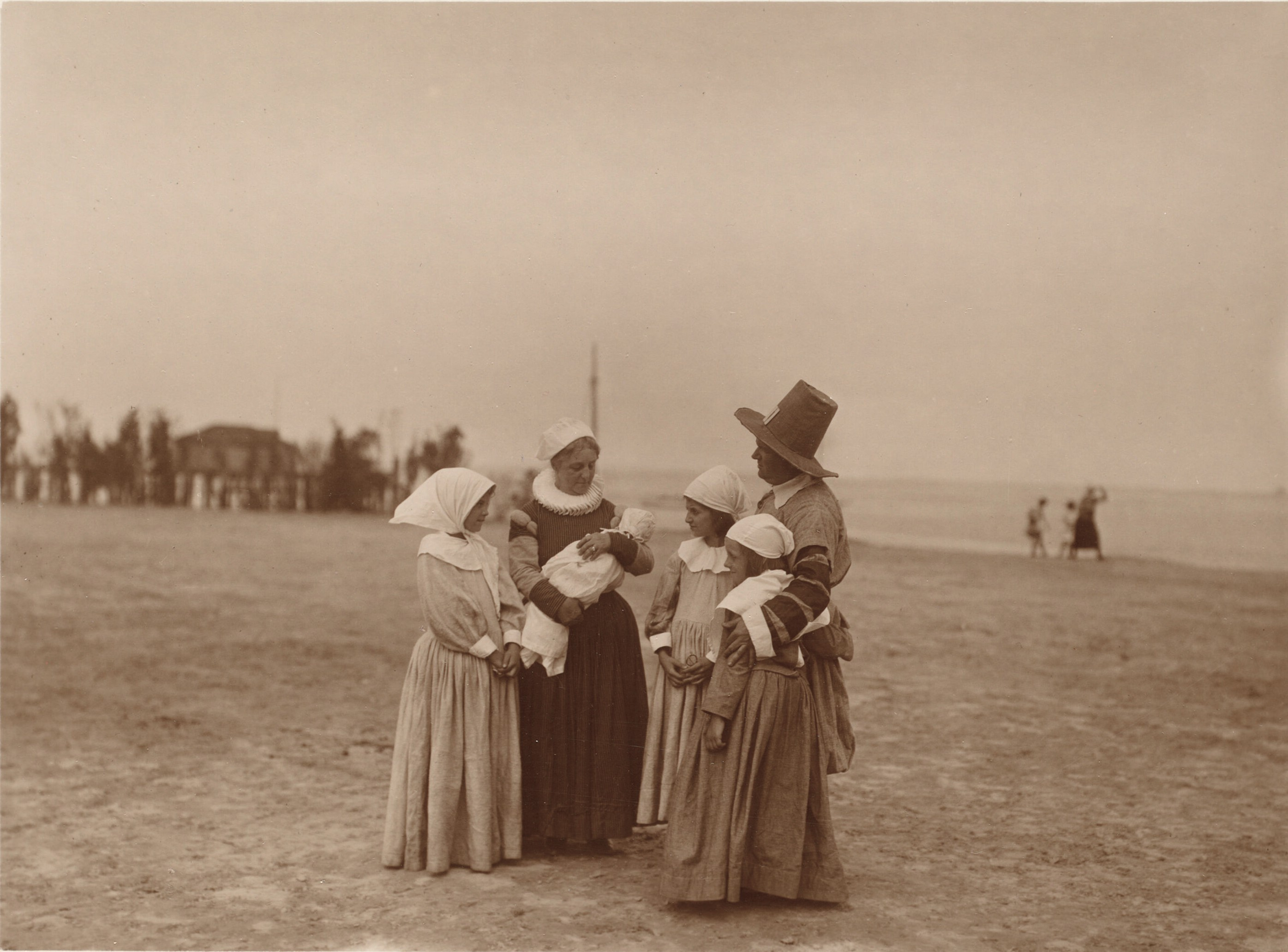
- Portrayals of Stephen Hopkins and family in The Pilgrim Spirit (1921)
- Born: fl. 1579; South East England
- Died: 1644 (aged 64–65); Plymouth Colony
- Other names: Stevin Hopkins [sic], Stephan Hopkins
- Occupations: Adventurer, clerk, merchant, emissary, tanner, tavernkeeper
- Known for: Mayflower Compact signatory, Sea Venture shipwreck survivor
- Spouse(s): Mary Kent (presumed), Elizabeth Fisher
- Children: 10, including Oceanus Hopkins and Constance Hopkins (see Family)

Steven Hopkins (fl. 1579 – d. 1644) was an English adventurer to the Virginia Colony and Plymouth Colony. Most notably, he was a passenger on the Mayflower in 1620, one of 41 signatories of the Mayflower Compact, and an assistant to the governor of Plymouth Colony through 1636. He worked as a tanner and merchant and was recruited by the Company of Merchant Adventurers of London to provide the governance for the colony and to assist with the colony's ventures. He was the only Mayflower passenger with prior New World experience, having been shipwrecked in Bermuda in 1609 en route to Jamestown, Virginia. Hopkins lived in Jamestown from 1610 to 1614, then returned to England. Hopkins settled in Plymouth Colony and died there in 1644.

== English origins ==
Hopkins was baptized on 30 April 1581 at Upper Clatford, Hampshire, England, the son of John Hopkins and Elizabeth Williams. He died at Plymouth Colony, Massachusetts between 6 June 1644 and 17 July 1644. Not much is known about his early life in Hampshire, but his family appears to have moved to Winchester, Hampshire, by 1586. His father died there before 4 September 1593 when his estate inventory was taken, and by 1604 Stephen had moved to Hursley, Hampshire. (Note: Hopkins's biographers had long stated he had originated in Wortley, Gloucester, and had married Constance Dudley, but this claim was disproven in 1998 with the discovery of his origins in Hursley. His wife Mary's maiden name was unknown until 2012.)

== Early adventures in the New World ==
Scholars affirm that Stephen Hopkins was the only Mayflower passenger who had previously been to the New World, and that Hopkins had adventures that included surviving a shipwreck in Bermuda ("Isle of Devils") and working from 1610 to 1614 in Jamestown. Genealogy experts appearing on the TV series Who Do You Think You Are? with his descendant Allison Janney agreed.

In early 1609, Stephen Hopkins began employment as a minister's clerk, reading religious works to a congregation including members of the Virginia Company. On 2 June 1609, Hopkins left his wife and family, and in his ministerial clerk's position, departed for Jamestown in Virginia on the 300-ton Sea Venture, flagship of a flotilla led by Sir George Somers. The Sea Venture was carrying the new Jamestown governor, Sir Thomas Gates, to his post, as well as resupplying the colony with goods and new settlers.

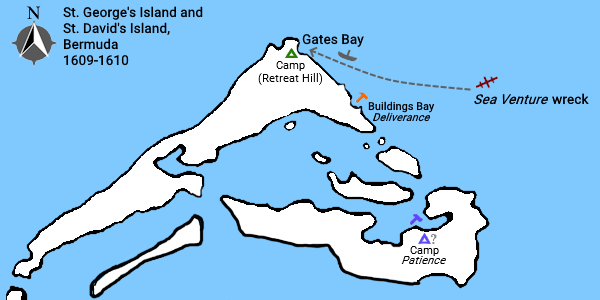
Bermuda and the wreck of the Sea Venture, 1609

After almost two months into the voyage, a severe tropical storm separated the ships of the flotilla on 24 July 1609, and by evening, the storm began raging worse and lasted for five days. Just when the Sea Venture was about to sink from storm damage, "land" was called out, with that being the island of Bermuda. The ship was forced to run itself aground about a mile offshore to keep from sinking. The castaways soon found that Bermuda was a Paradise, with plentiful water and food.

The colonists were unwilling to continue the voyage, and made repeated attempts to escape and stay in the islands. Hopkins argued that the hurricane had dissolved the settlers' indentured labour contract with the Virginia Company, as the Virginia Company had not kept its promise to deliver them safely. Each of them could, then, freely choose to accept Gates' governance, strike out alone, or join a co-operative settlement. His arguments have been interpreted as an early statement of social contract theory. This Hopkins urged secretly, and Gates considered it mutinous, as he insisted on proceeding, and had organized the settlers as a prison labour camp to prevent escapes.

On 1 September 1609, a month after the shipwreck, they had built up their ship's longboat for an ocean voyage. They sent eight men out to try to reach Jamestown to get help, but they never returned. In late November 1609, they commenced construction of boats enough to take everyone off the island. By January 1610, even though Stephen Hopkins had remained with Governor Gates' group, he started voicing dissatisfaction with the governance of Thomas Gates and questioning his authority. Hopkins was arrested and charged with mutiny and was found guilty, for which the sentence was death. Many persons begged mercy for him, and he obtained a pardon. Hopkins ceased voicing controversial issues.

The English in Jamestown, and those later in Plymouth Colony, were the antithesis of each other—with those in Virginia composed of titled leaders who were in charge of often inexperienced settlers as well as soldiers who were veterans of European wars, such as Capt. John Smith. All at Jamestown were focused on returning a profit to their London investors, and under great stress when no gold, minerals, or anything else of much value to London was found in the Chesapeake area. The colonists could not or would not farm, bartered for food with the natives, and later there was some theft in both directions between some of the colonists and the Pamunkey.

On 10 May 1610, the two newly constructed boats departed Bermuda with all on board and arrived at Jamestown eleven days later. What they found there was that the colonists in Jamestown were starving to death due to their inability and in some cases unwillingness to produce food. They were afraid to go outside their fort, so were tearing down their houses for firewood. They were not planting crops, nor trading with the natives or catching fish. Much of this had to do with some settlers feeling it was beneath their dignity to work and the violent abuse they gave the native people, which caused much enmity towards the English. At his arrival from Bermuda, Governor Gates estimated there was only days worth of food left, and decided to voyage to Newfoundland and from there find a ship heading for England. Just as they were preparing to depart, an English ship came into the harbor with supplies and new settlers, along with a new governor, Lord de la Warr. The colonists were forced to return and reestablish their fort, albeit reluctantly.

== Back in England ==
A report of the wreck of the Sea Venture and later events reached England. Most scholars believe that William Shakespeare based his play The Tempest on the report. It was first performed in November 1611. The play depicts the experiences of a group of passengers being shipwrecked by a mighty storm. A subplot involves a comic character called Stephano, who tries to take over as leader on the island. It is possible that Stephano is based on Stephen Hopkins.

While he was away, Stephen's wife Mary had survived by being a shopkeeper as well as receiving some of Stephen's wages. But she unexpectedly died in May 1613, leaving her three young children all alone. By 1614, a letter arrived for a "Hopkins" in Jamestown, and it is presumed that this is how he learned of her death, as he did return to England soon afterward to care for his children.

He then took up residence in London, and there married his second wife Elizabeth Fisher.

Although he had been through all manner of hardships and trials in the New World, including shipwreck, being sentenced to death with a last-minute pardon, and traveling to the Jamestown colony where he labored for several years, when he learned of the planned Mayflower voyage to northern Virginia to establish a colony, he signed on to go to America along with his family.

== The Mayflower voyage ==
Stephen Hopkins and his family, consisting of his wife Elizabeth and his children Constance, Giles and Damaris, as well as two servants (Edward Doty and Edward Leister), departed Plymouth, England, on the Mayflower on 6/16 September 1620. The small, 100-foot (30 m) ship had 102 passengers and a crew of about 30 to 40 in extremely cramped conditions. By the second month out, the ship was being buffeted by strong westerly gales, causing the ship's timbers to be badly shaken, with caulking failing to keep out sea water, and with passengers, even in their berths, lying wet and ill. This, combined with a lack of proper rations and unsanitary conditions for several months, is attributed as what would be fatal for many, especially the majority of women and children. On the way there were two deaths, a crew member and a passenger, but the worst was yet to come after arriving at their destination when, in the space of several months, almost half the passengers perished in the cold, harsh, unfamiliar New England winter.

On 9 November 1620 (O.S) (19 November 1620 (N.S.)), after about three months at sea, including a month of delays in England, they spotted land, which was the Cape Cod Hook, now called Provincetown Harbor. After several days of trying to sail south to their planned destination of the Colony of Virginia, strong winter seas forced them to return to the harbor at Cape Cod Hook, where they anchored on 11/21 November. The Mayflower Compact was signed that day. The passengers of the Mayflower argued, as the passengers of the Sea Venture had argued, that they had been freed from their indentures to the Virginia Company, and could now choose their own governance. Stephen Hopkins was among the signatories.

== In Plymouth Colony ==
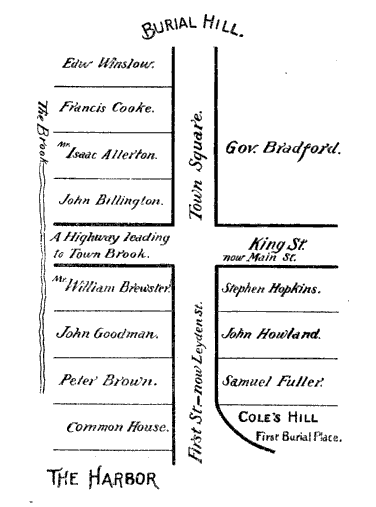
Hopkins lot on "First Street" (Leyden Street)

Hopkins was a member of the early Mayflower exploratory parties while the ship was anchored in the Cape Cod area. He was well versed in the hunting techniques and general lifestyle of the Native Americans from his years in Jamestown, which was later found to be quite useful to the Pilgrim leadership.

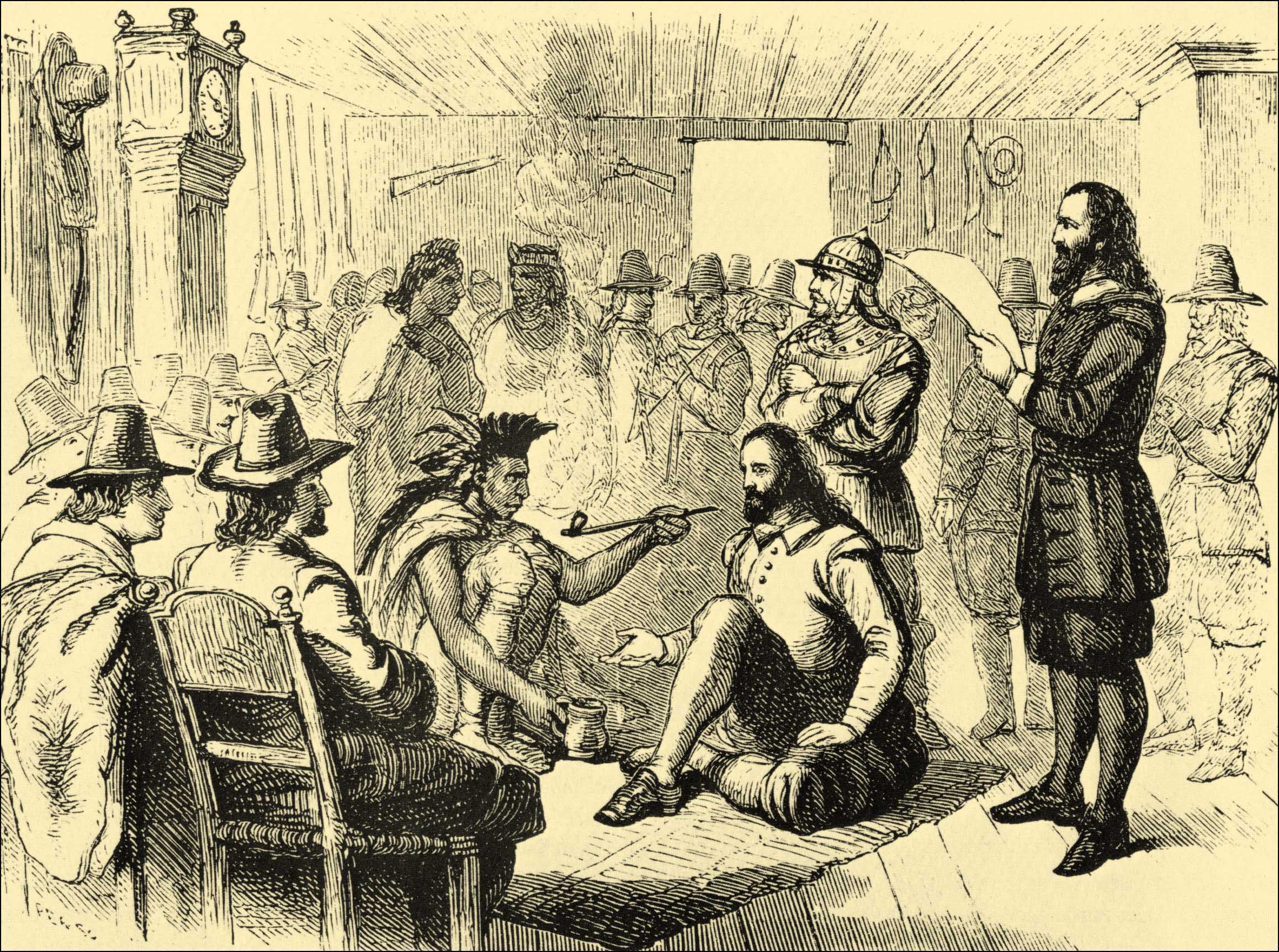
Illustration of Massasoit and governor John Carver making peace

The first formal meeting with the natives was held at Hopkins's house, and he was called upon to participate in early Pilgrim visits with the natives' leader Massasoit. Hopkins's home was used to house Samoset and Squanto. Over the years Hopkins's assistance to Pilgrim leaders such as Myles Standish and Edward Winslow regarding his knowledge of the local languages was found to be quite useful.

=== Hopkins Plymouth Tavern ===
The Mayflower Quarterly of December 2011, in an article on Plymouth-area taverns, has a paragraph on Stephen Hopkins, who kept an "ordinary" (tavern) in Plymouth on the north side of Leyden Street from the earliest days of the colony.

The article defines a 17th-century "ordinary" as a term for a tavern where set mealtimes and prices were offered. Terms such as "inn", "alehouse" and "tavern" were used interchangeably with "ordinary" in early Plymouth records.

Hopkins kept this tavern from the early colony days until his death in 1644. In the early 1600s he had also had an alehouse in Hampshire with his wife Mary and his mother-in-law Joan, which they maintained after he left for America in 1609.

Hopkins apparently had problems with the Court over his tavern. Plymouth records indicate that Hopkins let "men drink in his house upon the Lords day", "for suffering servants and others to sit drinking in his house" (contrary to Court orders), also to play games "& such like misdemeanors, is therefore fined fourty shillings." In addition, the Court had several charges against him "for selling wine, beere, strong waters, and nutmeggs at excessiue rates, is fyned."

== Family ==
The following is based on the extensive research of author Simon Neal:

Stephen Hopkins's spouses:

- Mary Kent is believed to be the first wife of Stephen Hopkins, born in Ratlake, Hampshire, in about 1580, the daughter of Robert and Joan Kent. Robert's father may have been named Andrew Kent. Joan's maiden name was probably Machill, or a variation thereof such as Machell, based on documents of the time. Research indicates Joan's parents' names were sometimes given as Robert and Joan Machell and that she (Joan the younger) had a brother Giles and sister Elizabeth. Giles and Elizabeth also appear as the names of two of Mary's children.

Per Neal, the Machell and Kent families may have been able to trace their ancestries back to ancient times when they first appeared at the manor (then castle) of Merdon in Hursley parish, which could have been as early as the 13th century.

On 20 November 1558, per the bequests of the will of Thomas Backe of the parish of Hursley, Robert Machyll (Machill) is cited as being an Overseer, Witness and one of those who had taken his estate inventory on 2 December 1558. Robert Machill was the father of Joan Kent and grandfather of Mary Kent, wife of Stephen Hopkins.

Robert Machell, father of Joan Kent, appears in court records for the manor of Merdon, Hursley, Hants., on 26 October 1559.

On 28 April 1560 Robert Machyll (Machill) is recorded in the Hampshire Record Office as being involved, with two others, in the estate inventory of Margaret Backe, late the wife of Andrew Backe of the parish of Hursley.

The will of Robert Machell of Hursley, Hants., per the Hampshire Record Office. Will date: 24 January 1575, proved 25 April 1575. Persons mentioned in the will were Joan (wife), Giles (son), and Elizabeth and Joan (the younger) (daughters). Joan (the younger) would later be the mother of Mary Kent.

Documents for the 1588 rental of the manor of Merdon at Hursley, Hants. lists Robert Kent, father of Mary Kent, renting at Ratlake for 5s a sum total of 46 acres (19 ha) consisting of house, orchard, garden yard, etc.

Mary's father, Robert Kent, died when she was young, leaving her mother Joan a widow. Mary's ancestry is difficult to research, but author Simon Neal determined that she had originally come from the Hursley area. No marriage record has been found for Mary and Stephen who had three children together between probably 1603 and 1608 – Elizabeth, the eldest, Constance, and Giles. The baptism records for the three children have been located in the parish registers of Hursley, Hampshire. It is known that after their marriage around 1602 or before, Mary and Stephen resided with her mother Joan where they ran a small alehouse. Stephen departed for America in 1609, with his children being left in the care of his wife Mary and her mother Joan. In 1620 Stephen, his second wife Elizabeth and children Giles and Constance were Mayflower passengers.

Manorial court documents relating to the manor of Merdon list the following court date and charge: 3 Sept. 3 James I (1605): Alehouse keepers – Joan Kent (and two others named) are charged with being common tipplers and have broken the assize of bread and ale. Therefore each of them is in mercy (fined) 4 pence. Joan Kent was the mother of Mary Kent, wife of Stephen Hopkins.

Joan Machill's brother Giles was named in the manorial court for the manor of Merdon, Hursley, Hampshire, for a minor offense with a date of 3 October 1611. At the time Giles Machill was recorded as innkeeper of the Star and his sister Joan Kent was the alehouse keeper.

In 1611 Joan died at about age 50, leaving the three Hopkins children in Mary's care. Mary died in 1613, at about age 33, with her burial entry appearing in parish registers on 9 May 1613 where she is described as the wife of Stephen Hopkins. Her inventory and administration were held on 12 May 1613 where it was noted she was the mother of Elizabeth, Giles and Constance and that she was a widow although at the time Stephen Hopkins was very much alive in Virginia. This may have been an error since apparently some monies from his employment at Jamestown did reach his wife and she may have known he was alive. In 1614 Hopkins received a letter at Jamestown informing him of his wife's death and shortly thereafter came back to England to care for his orphaned children.

Per author Neal, the Kent family continued its line through Giles Kent, Mary's probable brother, and continued to flourish in Hursley throughout the 17th century.

- Stephen Hopkins came on the Mayflower with Elizabeth Hopkins, possibly his second wife, although her situation is not clear and she may have been Hopkins's third or even fourth wife. His children Giles and Constance are referred to by Bradford as being children of a former wife, who may have been Hopkins's first wife, although this also is not clear. This wife was also probably the mother of an older daughter Elizabeth who may have been deceased prior to the Mayflower departure. Author Simon Neal, in a June 2012 Mayflower Quarterly article on this family, for purposes of convenience, assumes Elizabeth to be Hopkins's second wife and the mother of Giles and Constance to be children of the unknown first wife. The identity of his wife Elizabeth is unknown, although there is a marriage record in the parish registers of St. Mary Whitechapel in London for a Stephen Hopkins to Elizabeth Fisher on 19 February 1617/18, and it has been commonly established that this is the second marriage of Mayflower passenger Stephen Hopkins. Although it cannot be particularly assumed that this was Hopkins's second marriage, it does fit into the time period. Although there is no evidence found to date of what happened to the Stephen Hopkins and Elizabeth Fisher who married at St. Mary Whitechapel, author Simon Neal assumes that they were the Mayflower couple for the purposes of his research on this family. A search by Neal of baptisms in St. Mary Whitechapel in the second half of the 16th century reveals an Elizabeth Fisher who was baptized on 3 March 1582, but her father is not named and it is almost impossible to find out anything about her family. This Elizabeth would have been about age 35 when she married Stephen Hopkins and would have been close to his age, as he was thought to have been born about 1581.

Neal concludes that it is not possible to trace the origins of the Elizabeth Fisher who married Stephen Hopkins in the parish of St. Mary Whitechapel. She could have been from that parish or somewhere nearby in London or Stepney and of the Fisher family of Great Coates in North-east Lincolnshire. Neal emphasizes that there is no conclusive evidence that this is the same couple who embarked on the Mayflower but is assumed by most genealogists to be so. Elizabeth had already died when her husband Stephen wrote his will on 6 June 1644, as in it he asks to be buried next to his deceased wife Elizabeth.

Children of Stephen Hopkins and his wife Mary, baptized in the parish of Hursley, co. Hampshire, England:

- Elizabeth Hopkins was baptized on 13 March 1603/04. She was alive at her mother's death in 1613, but nothing else is known of her. As she did not board the Mayflower with her family, it is assumed she may have been married or deceased. Author Caleb Johnson believes she had died prior to the Mayflower sailing. This theory is given credence by the fact that Hopkins and his second wife Elizabeth also had a daughter named Elizabeth, born about 1632.
- Constance Hopkins was baptized on 11 May 1606 and died in Eastham, Plymouth Colony, in mid-October 1677. She was a Mayflower passenger in 1620. By 22 May 1627 she had married Nicholas Snow in Plymouth and had twelve children. Her husband was a passenger on the ship Anne in 1623 and died on 15 November 1676. Both Constance and Nicholas were probably buried in Cove Burying Ground, Eastham, where memorial plaques for each were placed in 1966 by descendants.
- Giles Hopkins was baptized on 30 January 1607/08 and died in Eastham between 5 March 1688/9 and 16 April 1690. He was buried in Cove Burying Ground, Eastham. He was a Mayflower passenger in 1620. On 9 October 1639 he married Catherine Wheldon in Plymouth. Shortly thereafter they moved to Yarmouth, living there for about five years before moving to Eastham. They had ten children. Catherine was listed in his will (as "Catorne") but likely died sometime shortly after him.

Children of Stephen and Elizabeth Hopkins:

- Damaris (1) was born about 1618 in England and died young in Plymouth. Mayflower passenger.
- Oceanus was born at sea on the Mayflower voyage in the fall of 1620. He died by 22 May 1627.
- Caleb was born in Plymouth about 1624. He became a seaman and died at Barbados between 1644 and 1651.
- Deborah was born in Plymouth about 1626 and died probably before 1674. She married Andrew Ring at Plymouth on 23 April 1646 and had six children.
- Damaris (2) was born in Plymouth about 1627-8 and died in Plymouth between January 1665/6 and 18 November 1669. She married Jacob Cooke after 10 June 1646 and had seven children. Jacob was a son of Pilgrim Francis Cooke.
- Ruth was born about 1630 and died in Plymouth between 30 November 1644 and spring 1651. She was unmarried.
- Elizabeth was born in Plymouth about 1632 and probably died before 6 October 1659. She was unmarried.

== Will and death ==
Stephen Hopkins died sometime between 6 June 1644, and 17 July of that year. He made his will on 6 June 1644, and requested that he be buried next to his deceased wife, Elizabeth. The inventory was taken on 17 July 1644, and mentions his deceased wife; his sons Giles and Caleb; his daughters Constance, Deborah, Damaris, Ruth and Elizabeth. It was probated 20 August 1644. The burial place of Stephen Hopkins is unknown.

== Servants on the Mayflower with the Hopkins family ==
- Edward Doty. Servant, aged likely between 21 and 25. He signed the Mayflower Compact, with his name spelled as "Doten". He had a long, controversial life in Plymouth Colony, dying about 1655.
- Edward Leister. As reported by William Bradford, he came on the Mayflower as a servant to Stephen Hopkins. He signed the Mayflower Compact, where his name was spelled as "Liester". He may have been in his early twenties and possibly came from the area of London where the Hopkins family resided before boarding the Mayflower. The Plymouth division of cattle in 1627 does not list him, and he may have left the area by that time. William Bradford reported he "went to Virginia, and ther dyed", although no records of Leister in Virginia have yet been found.

== See also ==
- First Families of Virginia
- Jamestown, Virginia
- Pilgrim Fathers
- Stephano (The Tempest)
