= La Commedia Del Sangue: Vampyr Theatre =

La Commedia del Sangue: Vampyr Theatre (1992–1997) was a series of plays on the theme of vampires, first performed in New York City. It was started by playwright Tony Sokol as an extension of his 1986 show "I was Thirsty and You Drowned Me," a vampire ritual performance piece Sokol performed at the Anarchist's Switchboard, Centerfold and other clubs. The first Vampyr Theatre performance was at Le Bar Bat in May 1992. Sokol had placed ads in the back pages of New York City newspapers asking, "Are you a vampire?" eventually interviewing hundreds of self-professed vampires. These interviews became the framework for the 13 plays he wrote for La Commedia del Sangue.

== Performance history ==
The Le Bar Bat performances were directed by Rosalie Traina, who had commissioned Sokol to write "The Summer After," a play about San Francisco in 1968. Among the original cast were Troy Acree, Mario Giacalone, Rosalie Traina, Lori Tomlinson, Tony Sokol, Shaunte Shayde, Sasha Graham, Jay Collagen and Jay Cavadi. Vampyr Theatre performed Sokol's scripts "The Auction," directed by Rosalie Traina, and "One of Us" directed by Sokol. Special effects were done by Chris Davis and Rick Crane. Original music was written and performed by the troupe's musical counterpart, Vampyr Theatre, which consisted of composers/musicians Bob Sushko, Ted Dailey and Tony Sokol.

La Commedia del Sangue was the topic of a two-part interview on Hispanic New York on WORK-AM during the Le Bar Bat run.

A group of interviewees who gathered for the Le Bar Bat shows would create the "vampire access line," a club that assembled information on vampire happenings around the city. The club began throwing its own vampire events and would eventually be taken over by prosthetic fang specialist Father Todd and become Sabretooth, the premier booking agent the city's vampire community.

The troupe moved to Zone DK, a weekly underground event of dark performances at the S&M club Paddles to perform "To Avenge, Divine" directed by Kurt Anthony. Added to the cast at this time were Justine Lambert and Jim Dowd. Rick Crane and Adam Barnick, who remained with the show until 1995, created special effects.

Vampyr Theatre revamped the first few plays and added Sokol's scripts "The Flesh, the Fantasy and the Fury" and "Welcome Home" and the troupe moved to Cafe Arielle, under the direction of Tony Sokol. At this point Mario Giacalone rejoined the cast and directed new plays at the troupe's new venue, Don't Tell Mama, where Sokol penned new scripts, among them "Blood Is Thicker than Water," which was also performed at Planet Rock Pub in Newark, N.J. Among the cast members at this time were Ed Lingan, Jennifer Coldwell, Jenice Malecki, Adam Weinberg and Greta Watson. Added to the special effects crew was makeup artist, Tyler Wolk.

During the Cafe Arielle run, Lori Tomlinson and Sasha Graham created a production company, New Moon Productions, and mounted "No Exit." Among the cast were several La Commedia del Sangue members, including Jim Dowd. Incidental music was written by Sokol.

For "Blood Is thicker Than Water," "One of Us" and "More Than You Can Chew," La Commedia del Sangue moved to Creative Place Theater and the directorial duties were taken over by Troy Acree, who would direct the bulk of the remaining plays. Shaunte Shayde and Sokol directed two club performances. Among the cast members during these performances were Tracy Dillon, Mark Lang, Caroline Surace, Noelle Nesgoda, Guadalupe Yepes and Nicole Smokler.

During the run of "More Than You Can Chew," Sokol appeared on The Joan Rivers Show, along with horror movie critic, David Skal and a group of vampires from Chicago. This was followed by "Let Us Prey," which opened at Creative Place Theater in November 1993", moved to Theatre 22 and ran there until March 1994(10). By this time it caught the attention of Michael Musto, who reviewed it for the Daily News on Jan. 28, 1994, who wrote "Every bit as weird as it sounds, "Prey"—written by horror/comedy scribe TONY SOKOL for the troupe La Commedia Del Sangue—presents its eerie rituals with conviction, unabashedly lacing the vampires' ruthless survival tactics with more of a raw sexuality than the misty romanticism they're usually diluted by."" Among the cast at this time were Steve Lynch, Karie Ehrlich, Esther Weerd, Mark Lang, Tina Wu, Dianne Acciavati, Dawn Marchan, Shaunte Shayde, Jericho De'Angelo, Roslyn, Rick Crane, Lauren Bailey, Tony Sokol, Adam Barnick, Troy Acree, Marcia Canestrano, Sophia Vailakis and vampire musician Jerico DeAngelo..

During the run of "Let Us Prey," Troy Acree and Dawn Marshan appeared on the Joe Franklin Radio Show.

In 1994 the troupe moved back to clubs for the show "Bite Me," performed at The Bat Cave at Downtime.

In October 1994, the troupe found themselves at Chapter 3 Theatre for the script "Dark Night of the Soul."

Magician Tony Scarpa joined the cast and crew as performer and special effects director for "Dances from a Shallow Grave" which ran at Nada Theatre during 1995. 1995 also saw the play Let Us Prey published by Fuck That Weak Shit Press. The cast included Mia Reeves, Andrea Ruth, Electra Frank, Fred Backus, Pat Dias, Angel Hughes and Karen Dillon.

In 1996 a portion of the cast performed "20 Bucks and a Bottle of Wine" - an improvisational piece based on the cast's antagonism of the press directed by Shaunte Shayde at The Bat Cave. During that year, director Troy Acree mounted his adaptation of Faust, which featured special effects by Rick Crane and a cameo appearance by Sokol as John Lennon. Also during 1996, Sokol produced an evening of spousal murder comedies, "How to Skip Alimony Through Voluntary Manslaughter." These along with his plays "Everybody ODs" and "Dinner with Socrates" were directed by Troy Acree, La Commedia del Sangue member Jenice Malecki and Sokol and the cast featured several actors from La Commedia del Sangue. Portions of this show were shown on the public-access television cable TV show, Drama with Miss Kitty, along with interviews with the cast. The show did well, despite its 1 a.m. starting time. Miss Kitty declared the troupe "king of underground theater." Troy Acree, Shaunte Shayde and Sokol also appeared numerous times on the Manhattan public-access shows, including Drama With Miss Kitty, Vampires and Vampyr Lounge.

The last play performed by La Commedia del Sangue was Sokol's Just Us Served at The Interlude Theater during 1997. Sokol did a BBC-Radio Broadcast on Halloween 1997. The cast included Kristin Ingram, Sam Mercer, David Purves, Mary Sulley, Ana de Luna, Rachel Scott, Sara Moon, Jessica Turner, Michael Maloney and Kim Dullahan.

== Theatre "For Vampires by Vampires" ==
La Commedia del Sangue: The Vampyr Theatre claimed to be a theater "run by vampires for vampires," and actively encouraged the audience and the press to believe that there were vampires in the audience and among the cast. In the Cooper Pioneer, Denise Ng wrote "I was hesitant about going, fearing that the play was all a hoax aimed at luring people into the theater to be sucked dry." There was also rumors at the time that local vampires were used by the troupe to harass and discourage competition.

Although Sokol admitted "It's easier to work with actors than with people who think they're vampires. I'd say that about one-eighth of the audience actually think they're vampires. The rest are like me and just like horror.' Some of his cast fall into the think-they-are category, but most are just actors."

== Audience participation ==
From the very first Vampyr Theatre performance, audience participation was encouraged. "The production has received a warm response from people in the vampire subculture who regularly attend to cheer on the vampires each time they bite someone," said J. Gordon Melton. Sokol later explained "In the early 90s I was taking a break from music and wanted to combine a Grand Guignol style theater piece with the kinds of experiences I'd have at the movies, both doing Rocky Horror (I was Frank N. Furter at a movie theater in Teaneck, N.J. from when I was 15 to 17) and at any horror movie showing at the RKO Valentine in the Bronx, people yelling at the screen, that kind of thing, except at live actors who could yell back."

The troupe also included guests from the local underground, from members of the Coney Island Side Show, for which La Commedia del Sangue participated in a 1995 benefit at Irving Plaza, to fetish performer Mistress Shane to filmmaker Rosemary Delaine. Horror video hostess Jungle Girl, was recruited for a role in "Let Us Prey" at the 1993 Fangoria Convention at Sokol's "snuff film audition."

== Inspiration ==
Sokol claimed to get the idea for Vampyr Theatre from the 1971 Hammer film, Vampire Circus, The Beatles' Yellow Submarine, and the Grand Guignol theater.

He did, apparently, get the idea for interviewing vampires from the Anne Rice book, Interview with a Vampire. Also as part of its earlier marketing, Sokol did many impromptu performances at local Goth nights at clubs like The Limelight and at various ceremonies held by the then-nascent vampire scene.

== Antagonizing the press ==
Because of the advertisements for vampire interviews, La Commedia del Sangue enjoyed press attention before the show opened. Sokol was interviewed for WOR-AM's Hispanic New York over a two-week period coinciding with the show's opening night. Later WOR-AM would give out free tickets to Vampyr Theatre and Sokol would be interviewed by Paraquat Pat on WNEW-FM, by Joe Collum on channel 9 news, would make several radio and television appearances on BBC Radio and Britain's Atlantic Network, and the show "More Than You Can Chew" was recorded in its entirety by Japanese television. During an interview with German TV conducted during a vampire night at a local club, Sokol, the only person being interviewed who didn't claim to be a vampire, bit the journalist. During an interview with Sokol for Britain's the Girly Show, Shaunte Shayde lured the reporters out of the club to a park, made them pay her $40 and a bottle of wine for her interview and then stranded them. When Village Voice reporter Susan Walsh disappeared in 1996, it caused upheaval in the New York City vampire community. When contacted by the press about her disappearance, members of the troupe were openly hostile to the press.

== Susan Walsh ==
Susan Walsh was a freelance writer who disappeared shortly after writing an article on New York City's vampire community for The Village Voice. Her research began at La Commedia del Sangue and she was introduced to local vampire, Christian, as a guide to the community by Sokol. According to Katherine Ramsland's book, Piercing the Darkness, Sokol believed Susan Walsh was still alive and that her disappearance had nothing to do with the vampire community she was investigating.

== Just a "Commedia" ==
La Commedia del Sangue means "the comedy of blood" and in spite of the blood and the special effects the shows were apparently more comedic than horrific. Rikki L. Grimes wrote in The Independent in November 1995 "I expected a Gothic horror play reminiscent of Theatre des Vampires from Anne Rice's vampire chronicles. What I did not expect was a horror comedy. The play is sprinkled with not only one-liners, but jokes that just lingered inside of my head even hours after the play had ended." Although this sometimes worked against it, John Chatterton wrote in his review of Just Us Served in the OOBR that "All the one-liners in the world need a story to hang from or they just lie down and play dead."

Vampyr Theatre is featured in Katherine Ramsland's Piercing the Darkness, David Skal's V is for Vampire, G. Gordon Melton's Encyclopedia of the Undead and Editrice Nord's VAMPIRI Miti, leggende, letteratura, cinema, fummetti, multimedialita. It is also featured in Blair Murphy's film Black Pearls and photography, video, music and artwork from La Commedia del Sangue was exhibited at the Musei di Porta Romana in Milan, Italy. It was also featured in the Italian Ritual magazine.

== Other reading ==
- V Is for Vampire, David Skal
- Encyclopedia of the Undead, G. Gordon Melton
- Vampira Miti, leggende, letteratura, cinema, fummetti, multimedialita by Editrice Nord
