= Maria Murano =

French opera singer (1918–2009)

Maria Murano, the stage name of Suzanne Chauvelot (July 4, 1918 in Nogent-sur-Marne – January 10, 2009 in Limoges) was a French lyric mezzo-soprano. She was most active postwar in the years between 1950 and 1970.

== Career ==
She started at the Paris Opera shortly after the end of World War II, then joined the Grand Théâtre of Bordeaux, where she became famous as Madame Alexandra in Jean-Michel Damase and Jean Anouilh's lyrical comedy Colombe in 1961.

Later, she played opposite Luis Mariano in Le Prince de Madrid, and Ivan Rebroff in Fiddler on the Roof.

== Private life ==
Her partner was politician Roland Dumas.

== Honors ==
- First Prize, Opera from the conservatoire
- Second Prize, Opera-Comique from the conservatoire

== Selected roles ==
- The Duchess in Jacques Offenbach's La Grande-Duchesse de Gerolstein in 1956
- Madame de Quimper-Karadec in Jacques Offenbach's La Vie parisienne
- La Périchole in Jacques Offenbach's La Périchole
- Moineau in Louis Beydts' Operetta Moineau
- Madame Alexandra (Julien's mother) in Jean-Michel Damase' Colombe in 1961
- La Duchesse d'Albe in Francis Lopez's Le Prince de Madrid
- Golde (milkman Tevye's wife) in Sholem Aleichem's Fiddler on the Roof in 1969 at the Théâtre Marigny
- Alice in Eugène Ionesco's The Picture at the Théâtre Silvia-Monfort in 1975

== Sources ==
- (in French) Annonce du décès sur le Populaire.fr
