= Cove Burying Ground =

Historic cemetery in Massachusetts, United States

- U.S. National Register of Historic Places
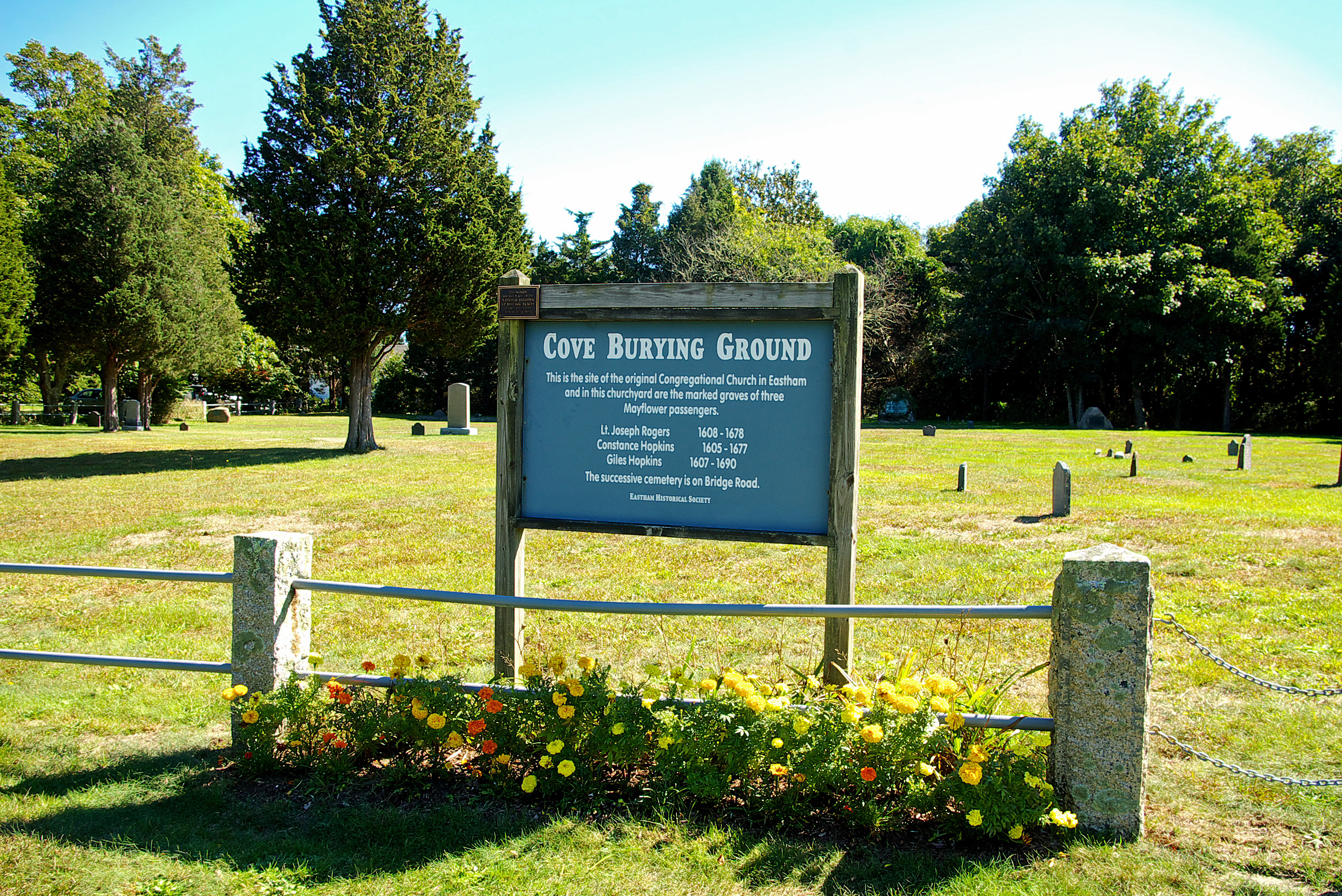

- Location within Cape Cod Location within Massachusetts Location within the United States
- Location: Eastham, Massachusetts
- Coordinates: 41°48′40″N 69°58′17″W
- Area: 1 acre (0.40 ha)
- Architect: Nathaniel Emmes
- NRHP reference No.: 99000561
- Added to NRHP: May 12, 1999

The Cove Burying Ground is an historic cemetery located just south of MA 6 and Corliss Way in Eastham, Massachusetts, US. It is Eastham's oldest cemetery, dating to c. 1646. It was laid out not long after the town's first meeting house was built nearby. Although there are no graves marked with 17th-century markers, it is virtually certain that some of Eastham's early settlers are buried here. It was the town's only burying ground until the establishment in 1720 of the Bridge Road Cemetery. The cemetery remained in active use until about 1770. Families placed memorial markers in there in the late 19th and early 20th centuries.

Three of the Mayflower's 1620 original passengers have marked headstones here. They are:

- Giles Hopkins (1607–1690)
- Lt. Joseph Rogers (1608–1678)
- Constance Hopkins (1605–1677)

The cemetery was added to the National Register of Historic Places in 1999.

== See also ==
- National Register of Historic Places listings in Barnstable County, Massachusetts
