= Edward Doty =

Early English colonist in North America

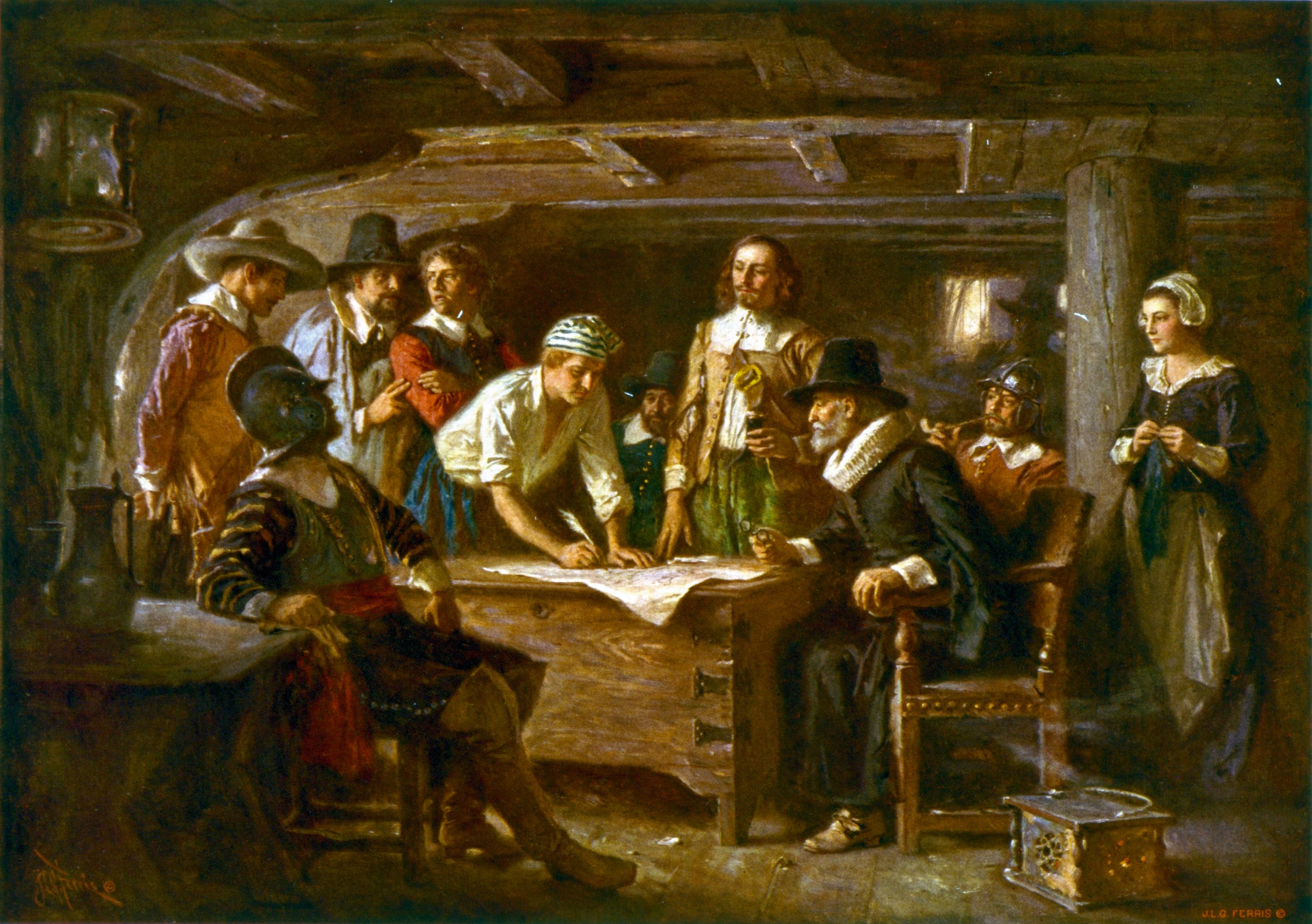
Signing the Mayflower Compact 1620, a painting by Jean Leon Gerome Ferris 1899

Edward Doty (c. 1599 – August 23, 1655) was a passenger on the 1620 voyage of the Mayflower to North America; he was one of the signers of the Mayflower Compact.

== Early life ==
Doty came from England. According to author Charles Edward Banks, Doty was from London and traveled with another Londoner, Stephen Hopkins, as his servant.

== Mayflower voyage ==
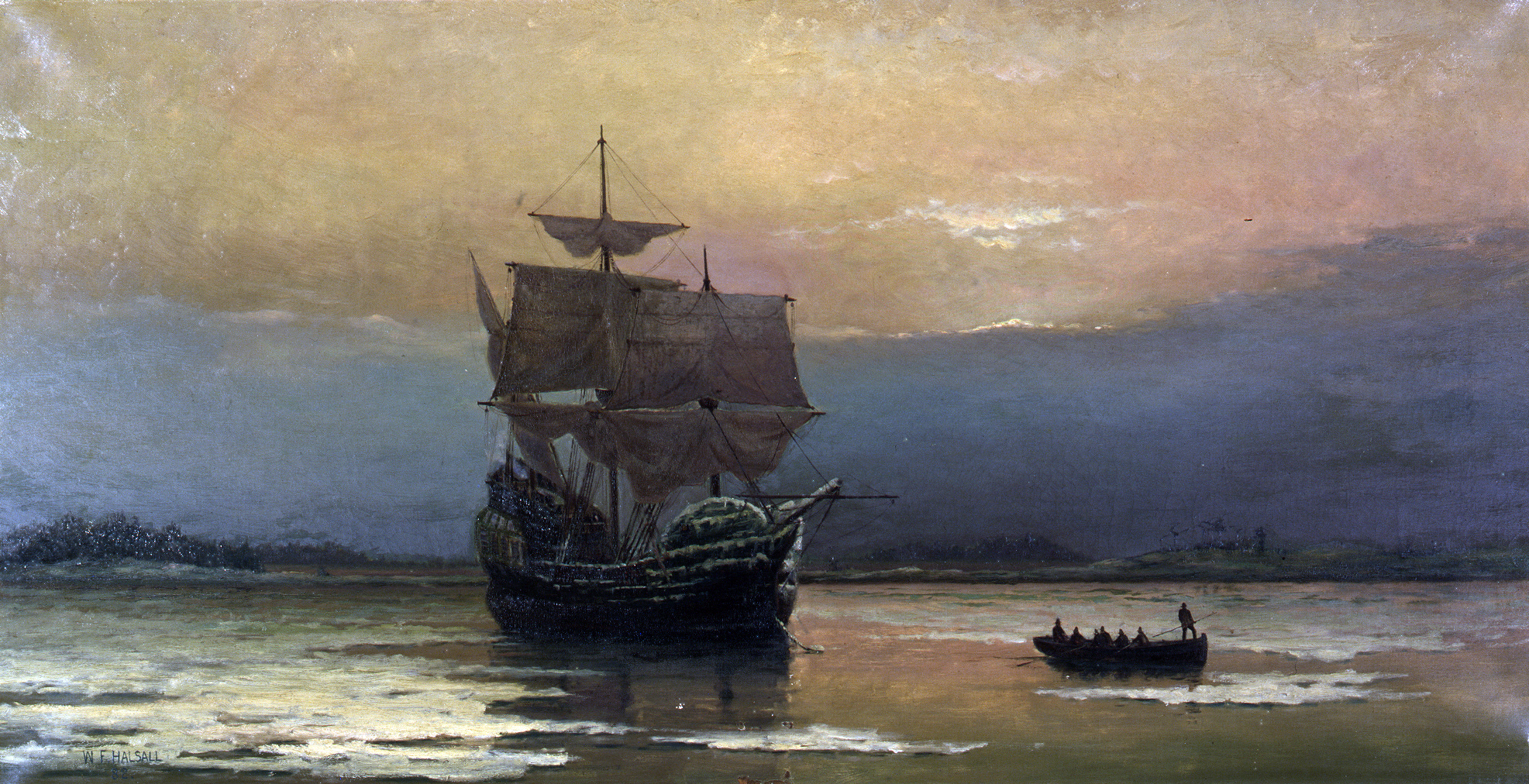
Mayflower in Plymouth Harbor by William Halsall (1882)

Edward Doty departed Plymouth, England, aboard the Mayflower on September 6/16, 1620. The small, 100-foot ship had 102 passengers and a crew of about 30–40 in extremely cramped conditions. By the second month out, the ship was being buffeted by strong westerly gales, causing the ship's timbers to be badly shaken with caulking failing to keep out sea water, and with passengers, even in their berths, lying wet and ill. This, combined with a lack of proper rations and unsanitary conditions for several months, contributed to what would be a fatal journey for many, especially the majority of women and children. On the way there were two deaths, a crew member and a passenger, but the worst was yet to come; after arriving at their destination, in the space of several months, almost half the passengers perished in cold, harsh, unfamiliar New England winter.

On November 9/19, 1620, after about three months at sea, including a month of delays in England, they spotted land, which was the Cape Cod Hook, now called Provincetown Harbor. After sighting land they turned south, attempting to reach their planned destination at the Colony of Virginia. However, strong winter seas forced them to return to the harbor at Cape Cod hook, where they anchored on November 11.

== Creation of the Mayflower Compact ==
The Mayflower's passengers included the Pilgrims and also non-pilgrims who were merchants, craftsmen, and indentured servants. The Pilgrims called the craftsmen and indentured servants "strangers". The Mayflower's destination was Virginia, but storms and lack of provisions forced it to anchor in Massachusetts. Because the Mayflower landed in Massachusetts, outside of the Virginia Company territory, the indentured servants argued that the contract was void (including their indentured servitude). William Bradford, one of the Pilgrim leaders, later wrote, "Several strangers made discontented and mutinous speeches". The Pilgrim leaders in an effort to stop the rebellion compromised and created "a set of laws for ruling themselves as per majority agreement"—known as the Mayflower Compact. Doty and 40 other male passengers signed the Mayflower Compact where his name appears as "Edward Doten". The importance of the Mayflower Compact is immeasurable, as it laid the foundation for the creation of the Declaration of Independence and then the Constitution of the United States.

== In Plymouth Colony ==
In late 1620, Doty accompanied Hopkins and others on some of the early Pilgrim explorations of the Cape Cod area while trying to locate a suitable location for their settlement.

In Plymouth Colony records, Doty's name was also spelled variously as Doten (Mayflower Compact), Dotey (1626 Purchasers and 1643 bear arms lists), Dolton (1627 Division of the Cattle), and Dowty (1633/34 tax lists).

Edward Doty later became a wealthy land owner, but his argumentative nature and display of temper caused him to be in the Plymouth court many times over the years.

Doty was one of the Mayflower passengers that left an extensive record of his personality. He had a quick temper and had many business dealings that in some cases bordered on the fraudulent. Other troublemakers were often removed from Plymouth (i.e. Isaac Allerton was forced out) but Doty lived there throughout the rest of his life.

Doty's first problem with the law came just after the Pilgrims had begun constructing their settlement. The early eighteenth century notes of Thomas Prince describe an incident of June 18, 1621, when the first duel (with a sword and dagger) was fought in New England between two servants of Stephen Hopkins – Edward Doty and Edward Leister. The duel ended with one being wounded in the hand and one in the thigh. Their punishment was to be tied head and feet together for twenty-four hours without meat or drink. But soon their master Stephen Hopkins, apparently taking pity on their "great pains", made a "humble request, upon promise of a better carriage" and they were released by the governor.

In the 1623 Division of Land, he received one acre and was later granted an additional twenty acres. Records of the 1630s and 1640s show numerous land transactions by him apparently making him quite prosperous. Per the record of December 4, 1637, one such land transaction involved land being granted to him and Tristram Clarke, "his father in law." It is known that he did own land in central Plymouth where the Mayflower Society House now stands.

In 1626, Edward Doty was one of twenty-seven Purchasers involved with the colony joint-stock company which afterwards was turned over to the control of senior colony members. That group was called the "Undertakers", and was made up initially of William Bradford, Myles Standish and Isaac Allerton, who were later joined by Edward Winslow, William Brewster, John Howland, John Alden, Thomas Prence, and four former Merchant Adventurers back in London. On the agreement, dated October 26, 1626, his surname appears as "Dotey".

In the 1627 Division of the Cattle, in which Doty shared, he probably had completed his term of service to Stephen Hopkins, as he is not listed with that family. His name as "Edward Dolton", is listed with the family of John Howland and wife Elizabeth.

The post-1632 records of the Plymouth Court, which has no existing records prior to that year, has twenty-three cases over the 20 years between January 1632 and October 1651 that involve Edward Doty. The records include suits/countersuits, and charges such as fraud, slander, fighting, assault, debt, trespass, theft, etc. But although Doty appeared before the court numerous times, he was never punished for criminal activities beyond small fines. So even though he was charged with fighting and was sued by many persons for fraudulent trading and goods sales, almost all were civil cases and were not of a criminal nature. And other than his duel in 1621, he never received any physical punishment that was commonly given for crimes such as theft, serious assault and adultery. He was quite fortunate in this regard as typical punishments at that time included whipping, branding, banishment and the stocks.

Even with his periodic court cases, in which he accepted the outcome of all such actions, Edward Doty lived a normal life as a freeman, paying his taxes and all his debts. He periodically received land grants from court as with other residents, and received other property rights and benefits from being classed as a "first comer."

Records do not show that Edward Doty ever served on any juries or held any political office nor was ever appointed to any governmental committees, which was unusual for a Purchaser and early freeman. The only recorded instance of his involvement in anything of a community nature was from a town meeting of February 10, 1643, when he was assigned with George Clark, John Shaw, Francis Billington and others to build a wolf trap in the town of Plain Dealing."

On the August 1643 Able to Bear Arms (ATBA) List "Males that are able to bear Armes", his name appears as "Edward Dotey" on the record of Plymouth men bearing arms.

== Family ==
Edward Doty married (possibly) twice:

- 1. He had no known children with his first wife, and she may have died young. Neither her name nor anything more has been found out about this wife. Per Banks, the register of St. Mary-le-Strand, London, gives the marriage of an Edward Dowty and Wynifryd Waryner, dated December 12, 1613, which may possibly be the first wife of Edward Doty.
- 2. He married Faith Clarke on January 9, 1635. Faith was the daughter of Thurston (Tristram) and Faith Clarke, arriving on the ship "Francis" in 1634. Since several of Doty's court cases involved Thurston and George Clarke, it would appear that some of his legal situations, including fights, were the result of in-law domestic problems. Bradford stated that Doty "by a second wife hath seven children, and both he and they are living." They later had two more children.

After Doty's death, Faith married John Philips on March 14, 1666/7 as his 2nd wife. She moved to Marshfield and died there December 21, 1675. She was buried at Winslow Cemetery in Marshfield.

Children of Edward and Faith Doty:

- Edward was born about 1636 and drowned in Plymouth Harbor on February 8, 1689/90. He married Sarah Faunce on February 26, 1662/3 and had eleven children. Her death is unknown.
- John was born about 1638 and died May 8, 1701, in Plymouth. He married:

1. Elizabeth Cooke by 1668 and had nine children. Her mother was a daughter of Mayflower passenger Stephen Hopkins and her father was a son of Mayflower passenger and pilgrim Francis Cooke.
2. Sarah Jones on November 22, 1694 in Plymouth and had three children.

- Thomas was born about 1640 and died in December 1678 in Plymouth. He married Mary Churchill by 1675 and had three children.

On January 17, 1671 Mary Churchill confessed she had gotten pregnant by Thomas, son of Edward Doty, with whom she had "carnall coppulation" three times – first time on July 15, second time on August 8 and the third was about "senight" after. A sergeant went to Mary Churchill's house, found Doty there and took him into custody. Doty was warned to "take heed lest evil come of such carriages". Mary Churchill was fined and at the time of his court hearing Doty fled the colony, but the two finally married about the time of the birth of their first child.

- Samuel was born about 1642 and died between September 18 and November 9, 1715. He married Jeane Harman on November 13, 1678, in Piscataway, New Jersey and had twelve children.
- Desire was born about 1645 and died on January 22, 1731, in Marshfield. She was buried in Cedar Grove Cemetery, Marshfield, Massachusetts.

She married:
1. William Sherman on December 25, 1667 in Marshfield and had six children. He died in 1679.
2. Israel Holmes on November 24, 1681 in Marshfield and had two children. He drowned in 1684.
3. Alexander Standish by 1689 and had three children. His father was Pilgrim Myles Standish. His first wife Sarah was a daughter of Mayflower passenger John Alden.

- Elizabeth was born about 1646 and died on April 7, 1742, in Marshfield Massachusetts.

She married:
1. John Rouse on January 13, 1674/5 in Marshfield and had three children. He died in 1717.
2. William Carver on January 28, 1718/9 in Marshfield but had no children.

- Isaac was born on February 8, 1647/8 in Plymouth and died after January 7, 1728, in Oyster Bay, New York. He married Elizabeth England in 1673 and had five children.
- Joseph was born on April 30, 1651, in Plymouth and died in Rochester about 1732.

He married:
1. Deborah Ellis in 1674 and had ten children. She died in 1711.
2. Sarah (Woodin) Edwards on March 5, 1711/2 in Rochester.

- Mary was born about 1653 and died before June 13, 1728. She married Samuel Hatch after July 10, 1677, and had nine children.

== Edward Doty will and death ==
Edward Doty made out his will on May 20, 1655, calling himself "sicke and yet by the mercye of God in perfect memory." His will was witnessed by John Howland, John Cooke, James Hurst, and William Hoskins. Doty signed his will with a mark. This was how he signed all his property deeds as he never learned to write.

Doty died on August 23, 1655, in Plymouth, Massachusetts Bay Colony. In Burial Hill Cemetery there is a memorial stone for him.

His estate inventory was dated November 21, 1655, mentioning his wife, his son Edward and other unnamed sons. His will was presented to the court on March 5, 1655/6.

== Faith Clarke Doty Philips will and death ==
Calling herself the wife of John Philips of Marshfield, Faith dated her will December 12, 1675, and died on December 21, 1675. The will was sworn June 6 – probably 1676, and named her daughters Mary, Elizabeth, and Desire, and her son John. On November 4, 1676, letters of administration were granted to her son-in-law John Rouse Jr. of Marshfield, husband of her daughter Elizabeth. She was buried in Winslow Cemetery, Marshfield, Mass. where there is an existent memorial stone for her.

Notable descendants of Edward Doty

Generations in this list begin with Edward Doty's children as the first generation.

- James Otis Jr. (February 5, 1725 – May 23, 1783), fourth generation, lawyer
- Mercy Otis Warren (September 14, 1728 – October 19, 1814), fourth generation, playwright
- James Duane Doty (November 5, 1799 – June 13, 1865), sixth generation, territorial governor.
- Charles Doty (August 17, 1824 – December 17, 1918), son of James Duane Doty, state legislator and United States Army officer
- Sile Doty (August 30, 1800 – March 12, 1876), sixth generation, outlaw
- Paul Doty (May 30, 1869 – March 3, 1938), seventh generation, engineer and 53rd president of the ASME

== Bibliography ==
- Banks, Charles Edward (2006). The English Ancestry and Homes of the Pilgrim Fathers: Who came to Plymouth on the Mayflower in 1620, the Fortune in 1621, and the Anne and the Little James in 1623. Baltimore, MD: Genealogical Publishing Co.
- Bowman, George Ernest (1920). The Mayflower Compact and its signers. Boston, MA: Massachusetts Society of Mayflower Descendants.
- Bradford, William (1908). Of Plymouth Plantation. New York: Charles Scribner's Sons. "Bradfords's History of Plymouth Plantation"
- Doty, Ethan Allen (1897). The Doty-Doten Family in America.
- Hill, Peter B., ed. (1991). Edward Doty of the Mayflower and His Descendants for Four Generations. Plymouth, MA: General Society of Mayflower Descendants.
- Johnson, Caleb H. (2006). The Mayflower and Her passengers. Indiana: Xlibris.
- Stratton, Eugene Aubrey (1986). Plymouth Colony: Its History and People, 1620–1691. Salt Lake City: Ancestry Publishing.
- "A genealogical profile of Edward Doty: A collaboration of Plimoth Plantation and New England Historic Genealogical Society" (PDF). Archived from the original (PDF) on November 2, 2011.
