= Stephano (The Tempest) =

Character in The Tempest

- The Tempest character
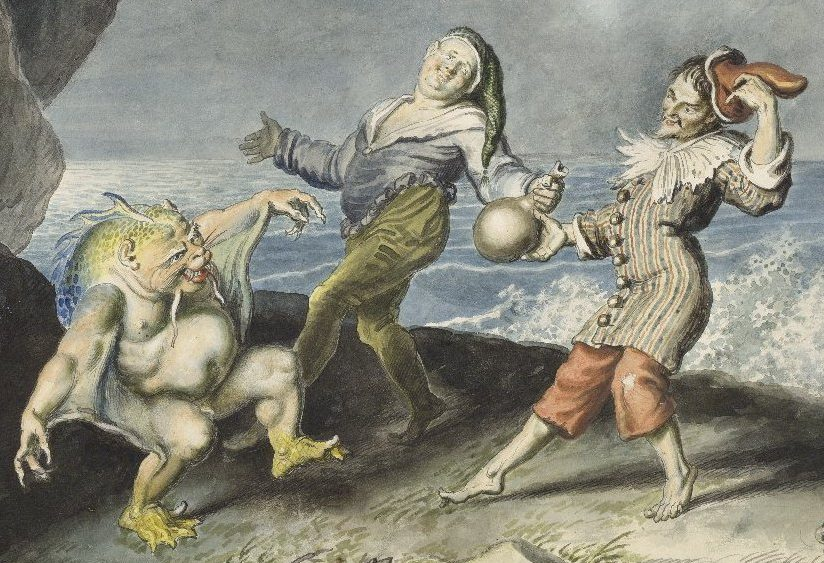
- Stephano (centre), Trinculo and Caliban dancing on the sea shore, painting by Johann Heinrich Ramberg (detail)
- Created by: William Shakespeare

In-universe information
- Affiliation: Trinculo, Caliban

Stephano (/ˈstɛfənoʊ/ STEF-ən-oh) is a boisterous and often drunk butler of King Alonso in William Shakespeare's play, The Tempest. He, Trinculo and Caliban plot against Prospero, the ruler of the island on which the play is set and the former Duke of Milan in Shakespeare's fictional universe. In the play, he wants to take over the island and marry Prospero's daughter, Miranda. Caliban believes Stephano to be a god because he gave him wine to drink which Caliban believes healed him.

== Character traits and analysis ==
Boisterous and often drunk, Stephano is willing to be regarded as a Lord by Caliban, although for much of the play Caliban appears to be in control, specifically Act 3, Scene 2. Stephano is rather gullible. He believes, particularly in the aforementioned scene, everything Caliban says. As shown in Act 4 Scene 1, he is easily distracted. (see 'The Plan' below). He makes false promises to Trinculo and Caliban, but in his intoxicated state he usually believes the promises himself.

== The plan ==
The plan Stephano, Trinculo and (mostly) Caliban formulate is to wait for Prospero to take his afternoon sleep, then burn his magic books as without them he is powerless. He is weak without them. They then plan to cut his 'wezand' (throat), drive a stake through his heart or beat him to death.

Stephano is then to marry Miranda and become king of the island, and he promises to appoint Trinculo and Caliban as Viceroys. Their plan is foiled, and their vanity exposed, when flashy clothes are left out as a trap by Prospero's loyal servant Ariel. The usurpers, except Caliban, who urges them to continue with the plan, are distracted by the clothes. This means Prospero can chase them away with a pack of magic spirit-dogs.

== Fellow plotters ==
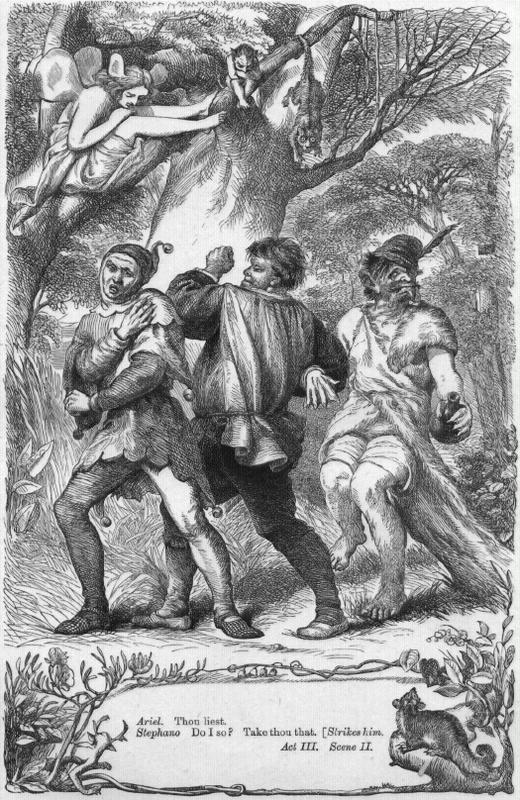
Ariel taunts Stephano (centre) into hitting Trinculo. Illustration by H. C. Selous

Stephano plots against Prospero with Caliban and Trinculo.

He is already friends with Trinculo, Alonso's Jester, whom he probably met at the palace. In the play, Trinculo finds Caliban hiding under a cloak and thinks he had been struck by lightning. Hearing a storm in the distance, he hides with him. At this point, an intoxicated Stephano walks past and thinks Trinculo and Caliban are a four-legged monster. He gives them wine and then he and Trinculo recognise each other.

Caliban believes the wine healed him and thinks Stephano a god. He calls him 'Lord' and possibly exploits this to take control in Act 3, Scene 2.

A key theme of the play is power. This is what Stephano wants, possibly because he is used to being a servant. Trinculo wants whatever is at hand, shown in his willingness to go along with the plan and the fact that he is the first to approach the clothes in Act 4, Scene 1. Caliban does not want power, but a kinder master. Prospero had treated him kindly until he attempted to rape Miranda, after which he was forced to live in a rock.

== Quotations ==
The master, the swabber, the boatswain, and I,
The gunner, and his mate,
Lov'd Mall, Meg, and Marian, and Margery,
But none of us car'd for Kate;
For she had a tongue with a tang,
Would cry to a sailor Go hang!
She lov'd not the savour of tar nor of pitch,
Yet a tailor might scratch her where'er she did itch.
Then to sea, boys, and let her go hang!
This is a scurvy tune too; but here's my comfort. (Drinks)
Act 2: Scene II

Caliban: Hast thou not dropp'd from heaven?
Stephano: Out o' th' moon, I do assure thee; I was the Man i' th' Moon, when time was.
Caliban: I have seen thee in her, and I do adore thee. My mistress show'd me thee, and thy dog and thy bush.
Act 2: Scene II

I prithee, be my god.
Caliban (to Stephano), Act 2: Scene II

Flout 'em and scout 'em, and scout 'em and flout 'em;
Thought is free.
Act 3: Scene II

He that dies pays all debts.
Act 3: Scene II

== Origins ==
It is not clear where the character of Stephano originated, though he is a familiar clown figure typical of the era. There is one idea that he was modelled after Stephen Hopkins from London. Hopkins was aboard the Sea Venture when it was shipwrecked on Bermuda. He attempted to start a mutiny while stranded on the island. He eventually made it to Virginia and back to England, then went to Plymouth aboard the Mayflower.

Stephano may have been created, along with Trinculo, to add comedy and show human greed.

Shakespeare used Trinculo and Stephano primarily as comic relief but also to demonstrate the evil in our nature. In a way, he seemed to have been condemning humans. The Tempest is a prime example of the selfishness, egocentrism, and power hunger that we see and deal with every day. Trinculo and Stephano were two characters used to show how wrong human beings are.

Unlike Antonio, which was featured in no less than four plays, the name Stephano only appears in one of Shakespeare's other plays, The Merchant of Venice.
