= Paul Aaron Langevin Doty =

American engineer (1869–1938)

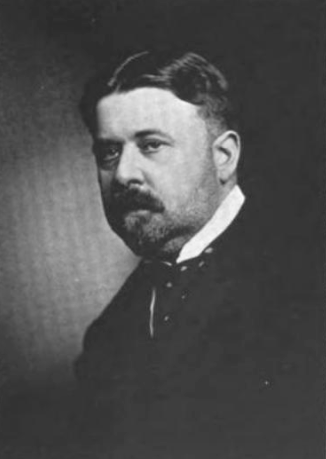
Paul Doty, chairman of the State Board of Registration for Architects, Engineers and Land Surveyors 1921–1938

Paul Aaron Langevin Doty (May 30, 1869 – March 3, 1938) was an American mechanical engineer, vice-president and general manager of the St. Paul Gas Light Co., president of St. Paul Trust and Savings Bank, and investor. He was the 53rd president of the American Society of Mechanical Engineers in the year 1934–35.

== Biography ==
=== Family and education ===
Doty was born in Hoboken, New Jersey as son of William Henry Harrison Doty and Anna (Langevin) Doty in 1869. He was a seventh in line descent from Edward Doty, Pilgrim passenger in the Mayflower in 1620, and one of the signers of the Mayflower Compact.

Doty obtained his MSc in mechanical engineering from the Stevens Institute of Technology in 1888. For his graduation Doty made experiments on the naphtha engine, of which the results were published in The Iron Age magazine.

=== Further career ===
After his graduation in 1888, Doty started the first half of his career in the gas industry. In 1904 he was appointed vice-president and general manager of the St. Paul Gas Light Company, the Edison Electric Light and Power Company of Saint Paul, Minnesota. This lasted until September, 1917, when he was appointed Major of the general staff of the U.S. Army.

In 1910 Doty had also been elected President of the Business League of St. Paul. He had joined the Minnesota National Guard, where in 1916 he obtained the rank of Brigadier General and Commissary General. In the late 1910s he was also appointed vice-president and managing director of St. Paul Trust and Savings Bank, After his serves at the U.S. Army he was appointed chairman of the Minnesota Board of Registration for Architects, Engineers and Land Surveyors.

In 1922 he had accepted the Democratic nomination for Member of Congress from the fourth district of Minnesota, but the Republican Oscar Keller took the seat. In 1923 Doty was appointed president of the St. Paul Association of Commerce.

In 1917 he served as Vice President of The American Society of Mechanical Engineers, and in 1934–35 as its president. In 1934 Dorr also returned in U.S. Government service one last time as regional reconditioning supervisor with the Home Owners' Loan Corporation, supervising the States of North Carolina, South Carolina, Georgia, Florida, and Alabama.
