= Oceanus Hopkins =

Only child born on Mayflower journey

- Born: c. 1620; At sea (Mayflower)
- Died: 1627 (aged 6–7); Plymouth Colony
- Known for: Being born on the Mayflower voyage

Oceanus Hopkins (c.1620 – 1627) was the only child born on the Mayflower during its historic voyage which brought the English Pilgrims to America. Another boy, Peregrine White, was born on board, after arriving in America, as the ship lay at anchor.

Oceanus was born to Stephen Hopkins and his wife, Elizabeth Hopkins (née Fisher), sometime between the boarding and arrival dates of September 6 and November 9, 1620. He survived the first winter in Plymouth, but died by 1627.

He was named 'Oceanus', Latin for 'ocean', because he was born on the Atlantic Ocean.
