= Patricia Clapp =

American writer (1912–2003)

- Born: June 9, 1912; Boston, Massachusetts, United States
- Died: December 10, 2003 (aged 91)
- Citizenship: United States
- Education: Columbia University
- Occupation: Author
- Spouse: Edward della Torre Cone (1933-)
- Writing career
- Language: English
- Years active: 1968–1986
- Genres: Young adult fiction Children's fiction
- Notable works: Constance: A Story of Early Plymouth (1968); Jane-Emily (1969)

Patricia Clapp (June 9, 1912 – December 10, 2003) was an American writer of fiction for children and young adults. Her first novel, Constance: A Story of Early Plymouth (1968) is based on the life of her forebear Constance Hopkins - a passenger on the Mayflower. It was nominated for the National Book Award in 1969. Her second book, Jane-Emily (1969) was described by Sarah Lyall in The New York Times nearly 50 years after its publication as "one of the great children’s ghost stories, featuring a nasty little dead girl who is not at all pleased when a good little living girl comes to stay in her old house."

Most of Clapp's novels were written as fictionalized accounts of historical events. Dr. Elizabeth: The Story of the First Woman Doctor (1974) focuses on the life of Elizabeth Blackwell who was the first woman to receive a medical degree in the United States. I'm Deborah Sampson: A Soldier in the War of the Revolution is loosely based on the life of Deborah Sampson, a young woman who disguised herself as a man and served in the 4th Massachusetts Regiment during the Revolutionary War. Witches' Children: A Story of Salem (1982) and The Tamarack Tree: A Novel of the Siege of Vicksburg (1986) explore the history of the Salem witch trials and the Siege of Vicksburg during the Civil War, respectively.

== Early life ==
Clapp was born in Boston, Massachusetts. Her father Howard was a dentist who died less than a year after her birth. Her mother, Elizabeth Blatchford Clapp, supported the family by running a toothbrush importing business. After her mother's remarriage, the family moved to Montclair, New Jersey where Clapp spent her childhood. As a young woman, she studied journalism at Columbia University, but left before graduating. She married Edward della Torre Cone, a transportation consultant, in 1933. As a young mother, she started writing plays for her daughter's girl scout troop. Between 1956 and 1979, she published over 20 plays for young actors and three for adult ensembles.

== Career ==
Her career as a novelist began while she was working on a genealogy project and discovered she was descended from Constance Hopkins who sailed on the Mayflower. "It was in those pages that I discovered Constance Hopkins who came to America with her family on the Mayflower. The more I copied that mass of material the more I thought about Constance. Fourteen years old, snatched from a familiar, comfortable life in London by an enthusiastic adventurer of a father, carted off to a land of wolves and Indians--how did she feel? I spent a lot of time thinking about her."

Clapp didn't publish after 1986 but in her working years she alternated her writing with her work in community theater and spending time with her family. She explained in Something About the Author in 1987: "Writing I can do when I choose to, not because I have to for financial reasons. I can afford to wait for the first flicker of an idea, to spend as long as I like on research, and then to lose myself in another era, living with people I will only know in my imagination, but who will become totally real to me."

Her papers are archived at the De Grummond Collection, University of Southern Mississippi, Hattiesburg.
