= Paul Swan (dancer) =

American artist and dancer

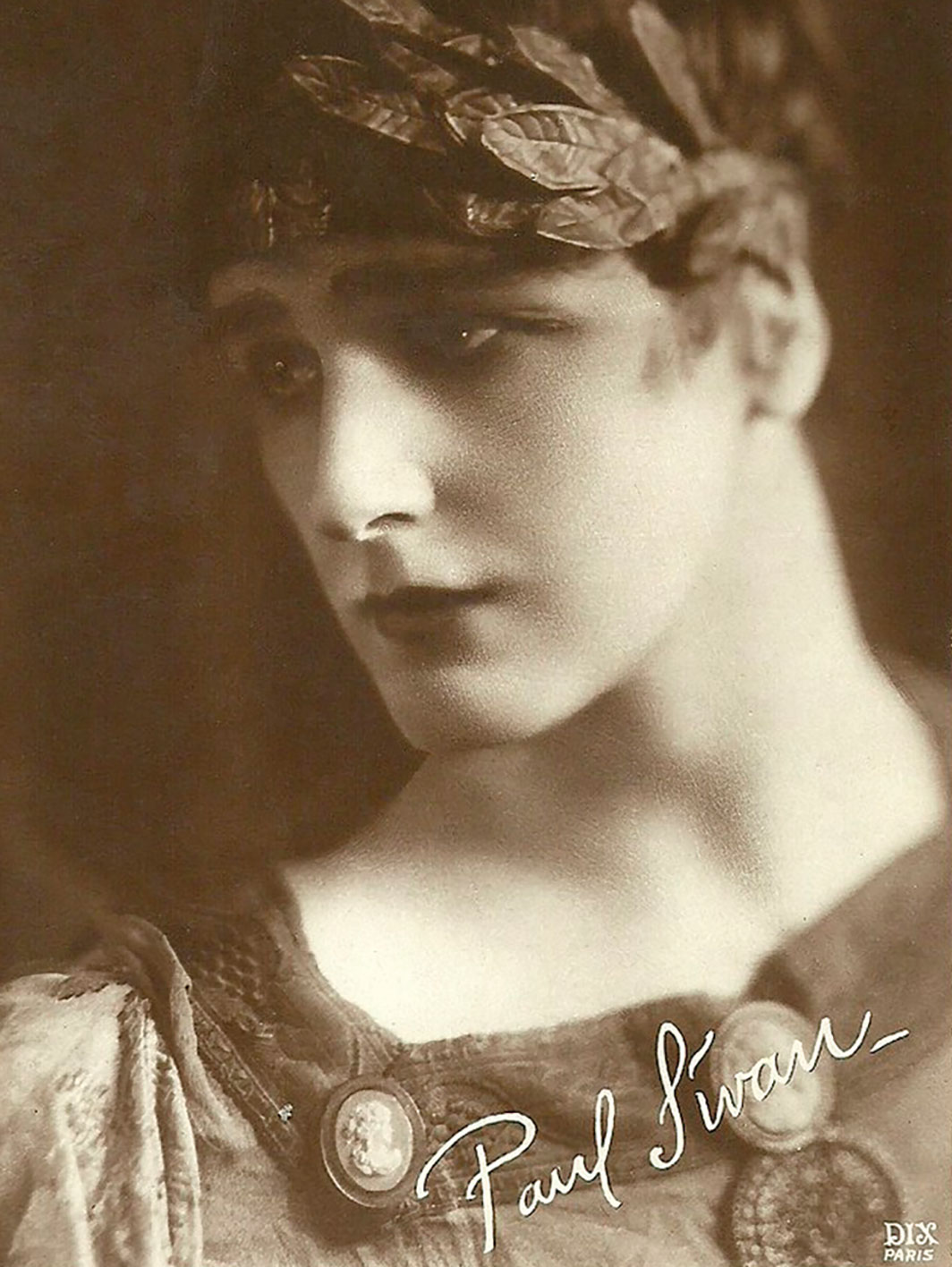
- Portrait of Paul Swan
- Born: June 5, 1883; Ashland, Illinois, U.S.
- Died: February 1, 1972 (aged 88); Bedford Hills, New York, U.S.
- Resting place: Crab Orchard, Nebraska

Paul Spencer Swan (June 5, 1883 – February 1, 1972) was an American painter, sculptor, dancer, poet and actor. Once billed as "the most beautiful man in the world," Swan has come to be looked on as a "gay camp icon."

== Life ==
Paul Swan was born in Ashland, Illinois in 1883. He and his family moved to Crab Orchard, Nebraska when he was 6 years old. His mother's religious convictions were disturbed by her son's "strange quirks" such as the elaborate theater productions he made with his sisters' dolls. Of his Nebraska home, Swan said in 1917 "My people are very orthodox and do not believe in the life I have chosen. They believe it wrong to cultivate personal charm."

As a teenager, Swan moved around various cities in the Midwestern United States. He tended to be rejected for his unconventional behavior and gender nonconformity, so he cultivated friendships with artists and LGBT figures in the area, including Willa Cather. In 1906 he was able to move to New York where he got a job with Delineator magazine drawing ladies' hats.

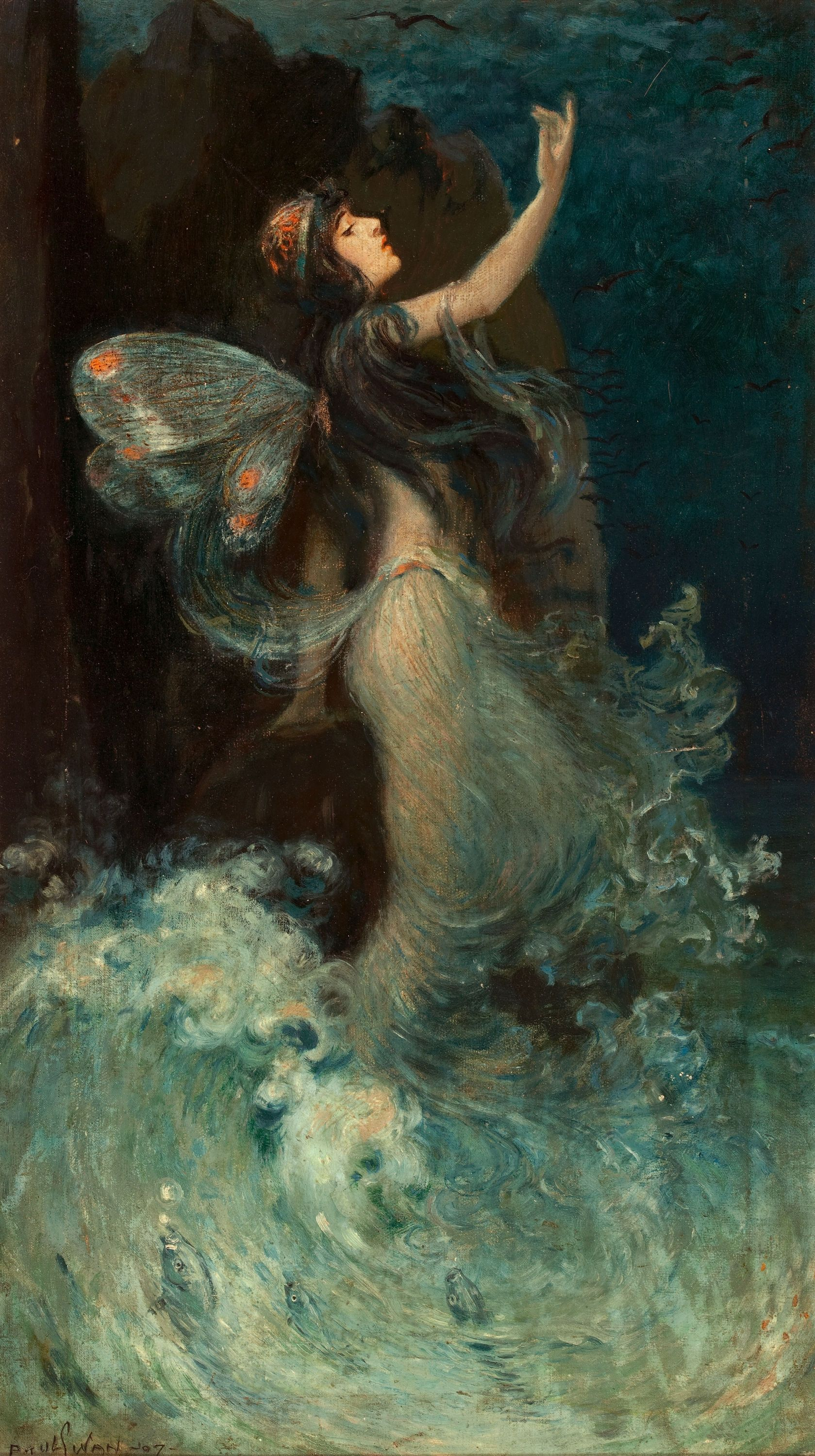
Water nymph, 1907.

In 1910 Swan saw Russian actress Alla Nazimova perform in Ibsen's play Little Eyolf in Albany, New York. He was inspired to paint her life-sized portrait and send it to her as a gift. She was so pleased that she commissioned Swan to paint four additional portraits. He used the money from the commission to travel to Egypt and Greece. In Greece he began his career as a dancer.

Swan married Helen Palmer Gavit, granddaughter of sculptor Erastus Dow Palmer, in 1911 or 1912. They had two daughters. Though Swan had a number of other lovers in his life, both men and women, he stayed close with his wife until her death in 1951.

The aesthetic, Greek-inspired art and dance styles that Swan learned during this time would remain little changed throughout his life. Swan would reject what he called "all the weird -isms" of "cubism, futurism, post-impressionism." This classical style was falling out of fashion even at the time that Swan was learning it. His decades of persistence with the outdated style would lead to his eventual perception as camp.

However, the eroticism of Swan's near-nude performances was shocking and innovative for the time. A journalist described the reaction of Paris audiences to shows that Swan starred in: "even this gay city has been shocked really and truly by the prevailing cult of nakedness, whose expositions grow more and more daring." Swan described himself in 1915 as "the only man in the world who has the courage to take off his clothes and dance."

"What he was doing would make him liable to be in prison," observed Swan biographer Richard Londraville. "He was able to walk through the world much more freely than most homosexuals would at the time. He was very lucky to have a wife that he could fall back on."

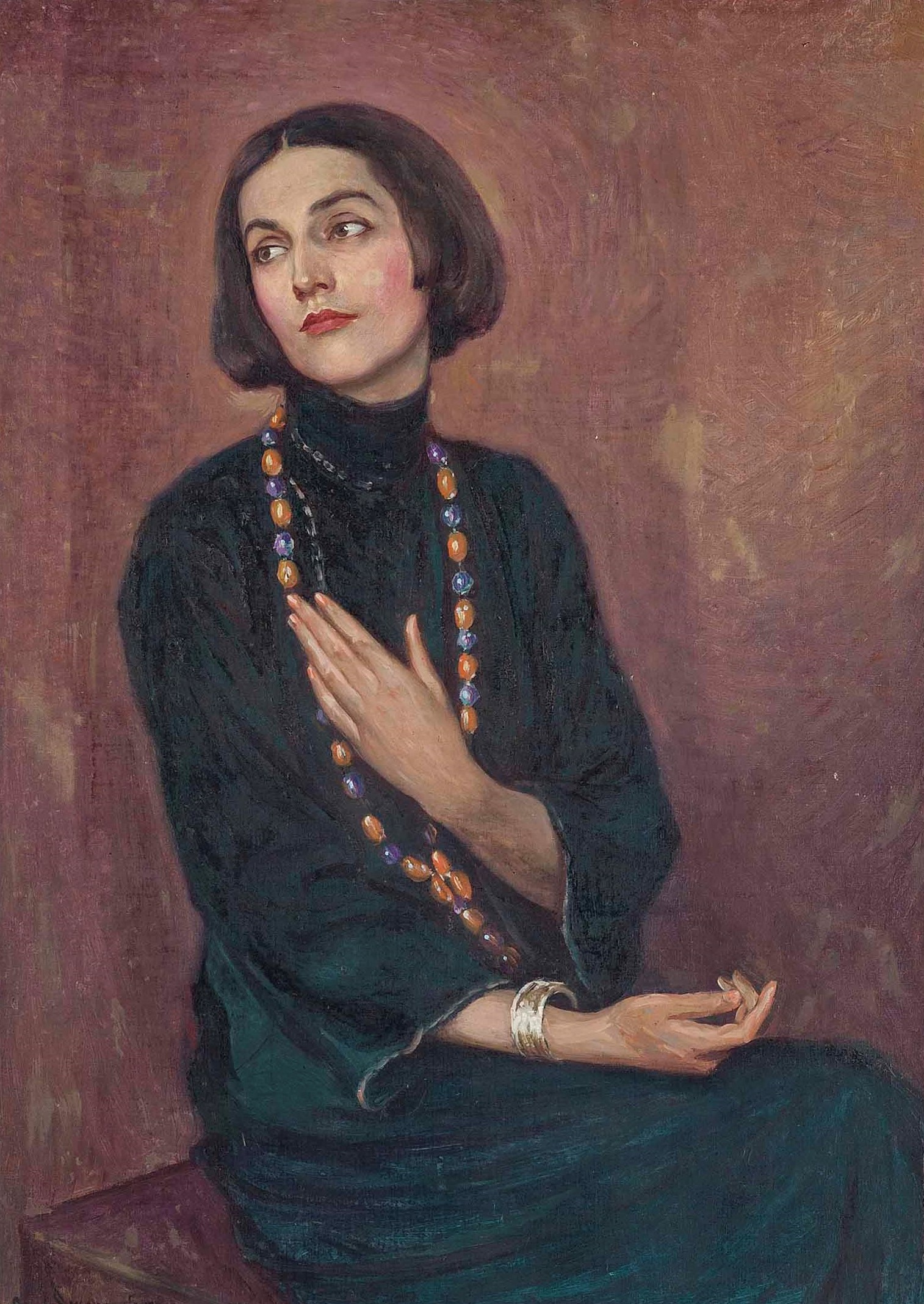
Paul Swan's portrait of Isadora Duncan, 1922.

Swan become a friend and possibly lover to Isadora Duncan, pioneer of modern dance. He painted Duncan's portrait in 1922.

His training as a dancer translated to a career as a silent film actor. He appeared in the 1923 film The Ten Commandments by Cecil B. DeMille, and in other films of the silent era.

Swan moved to Paris in the early 1930s. Much of his artwork from this period was lost as a consequence of the Nazi occupation of Paris. His fame in the US had faded during his time overseas, but the war forced him to return. Swan took up residence at a studio in Carnegie Hall. There he performed weekly dance recitals almost every Sunday evening from 1939 to 1969.

As fashions changed and Swan aged, his weekly dance performances came to be seen as campy. Andy Warhol included Swan's dance in Camp, a 1965 underground film about the camp style.

Swan died in 1972 at age 88 in Bedford Hills, NY. He is buried in his family's plot in Crab Orchard.

== In media ==
Swan's beauty was referenced in a routine by Fred and Adele Astaire, in which Adele joking scolded Fred "don't think you look like Paul Swan." This comedic line was reused in the 1927 song Funny Face by George and Ira Gershwin, recorded by Ella Fitzgerald among others.

A play about Swan's dance recitals in later life, Paul Swan is Dead and Gone, ran in New York in 2019.

== Gallery ==
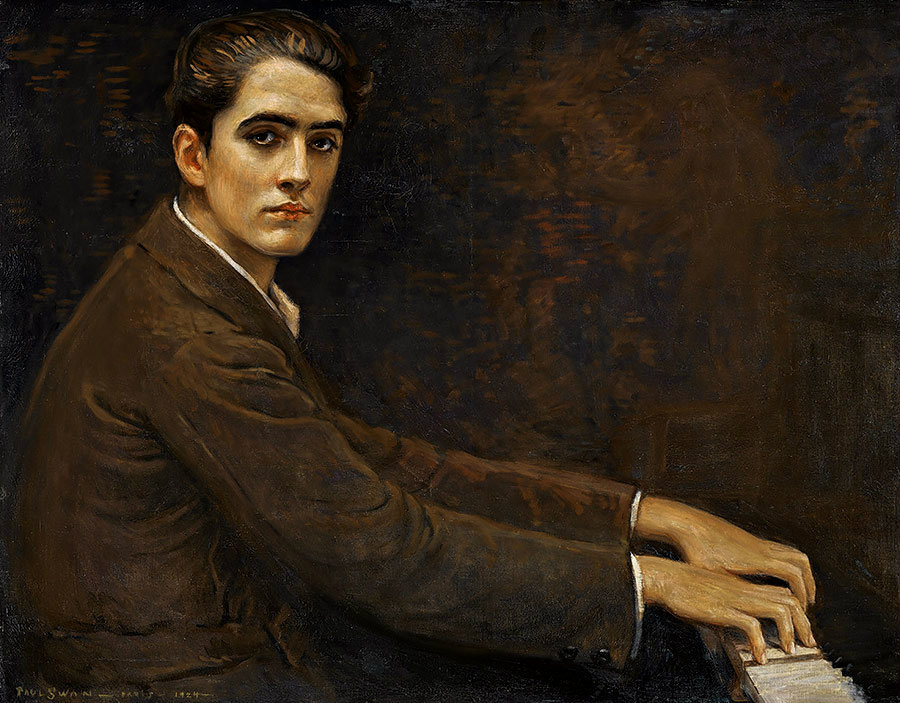
Portrait of Joaquín Nin-Culmell, 1924.

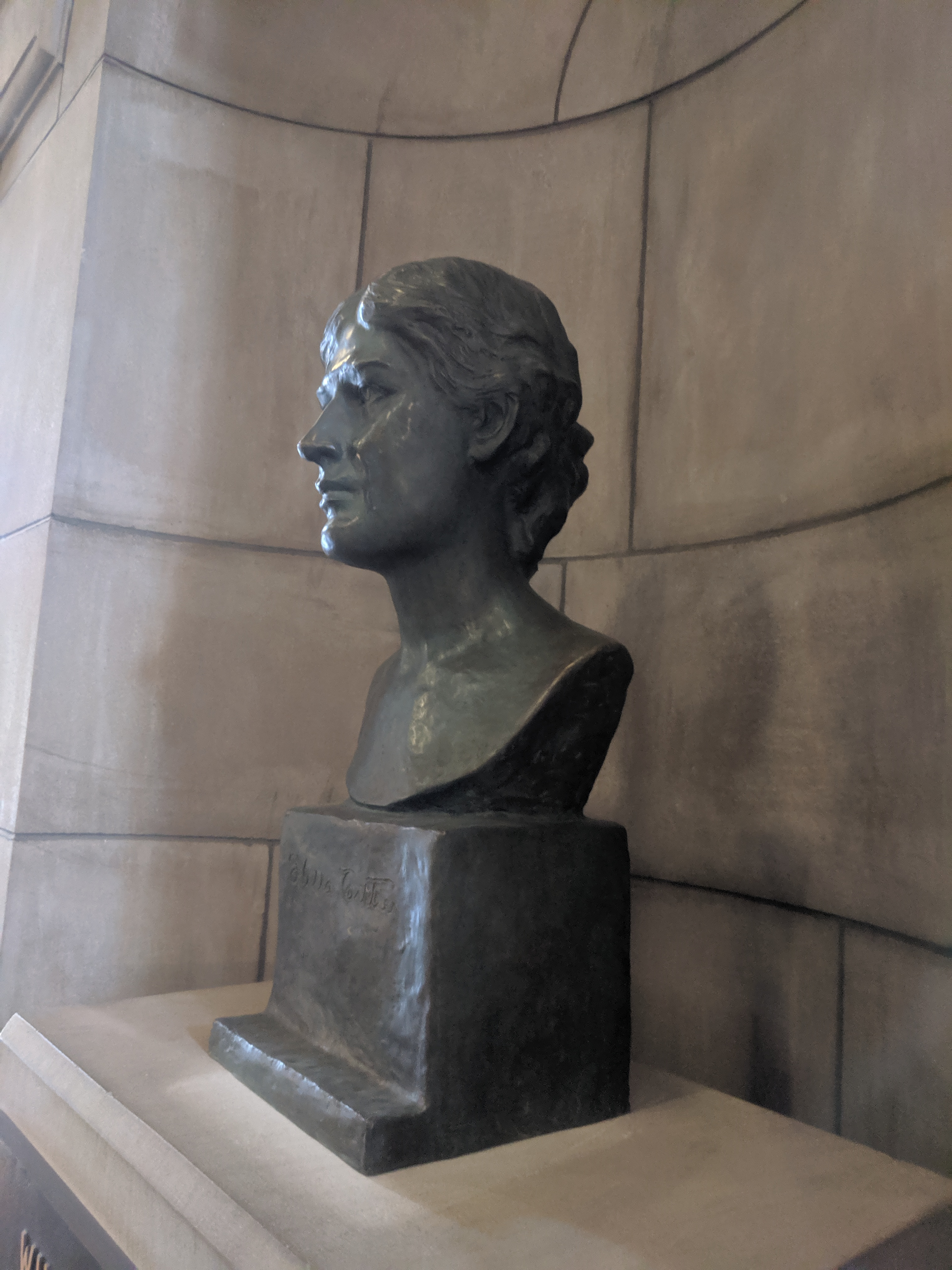
Bust of Willa Cather in the Nebraska Hall of Fame, 1962.

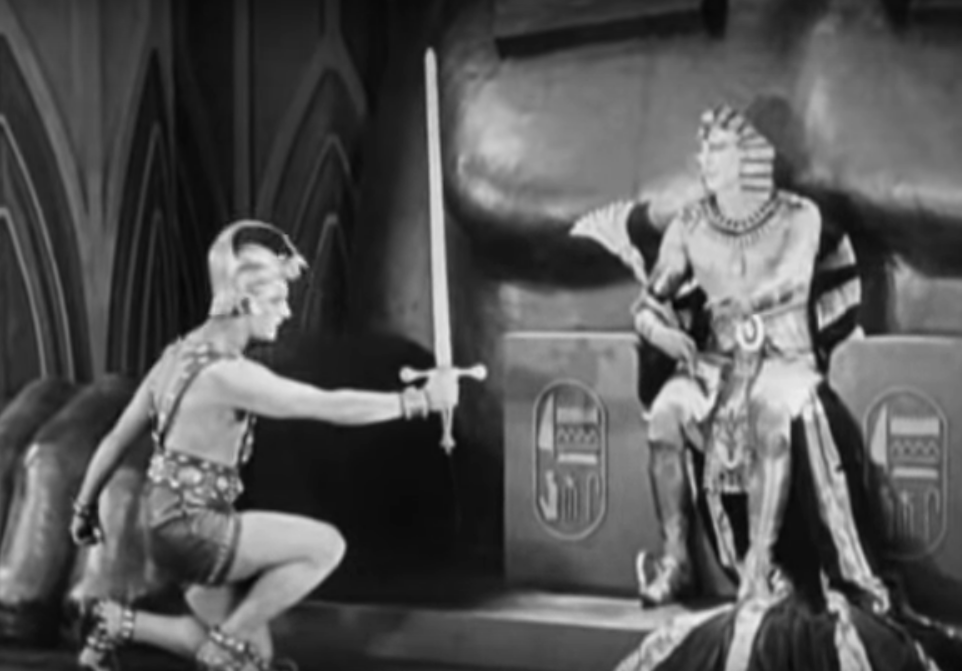
Charles De Roche and Paul Swan (kneeling) in The Ten Commandments
