= The Law of Remains =

1991 play by Reza Abdoh

The Law of Remains is a 1991 American play by Los Angeles-based Iranian playwright, director, and filmmaker Reza Abdoh. The play, initially staged in a New York City hotel, was described in A Companion to Twentieth-Century American Drama as "an apocalyptic fantasia". In its 1992 review, The New York Times characterized it as "one of the angriest theater pieces ever hurled at a New York audience".

The seven-scene play focuses on violence and its social impacts, through the use of Andy Warhol’s aesthetics, incorporating police reports on the murders of Jeffrey Dahmer in exploring the deeds of fictionalized killer "Jeffrey Snarling". It uses Dahmer's crimes, particularly his murder of an adolescent Laotian boy who almost escaped him until police presumed the conflict was a dispute between gay lovers, to create a metaphor for "governmental indifference to the AIDS crisis". Anita Durst, an actress and disciple of Abdoh who procured the location, summarized the play as "Andy Warhol and Jeffrey Dahmer meet in Heaven". The play is a non-linear multi-media presentation, adding to traditional dramatic structure a soundtrack of "death, sex and violence" and "raucous" imagery, both live and electronic.

According to theater scholar Jordan Schildcrout, "Abdoh's assaultive use of loud noises and bloody images outside a traditional theater space is very much in line with Artaud's notions of a 'theater of cruelty,' intended to shock and provoke the audience. In this way, Abdoh uses a form of theatricality that does not offer enlightenment or catharsis but rather demands that the audience experience the brutality of Dahmer's crimes on a physical and visceral level."

At the Eugene Lang College of The New School for Social Research the undergraduate senior theatre thesis group staged a reinterpretation of The Law of Remains in May 2011 at La MaMa Experimental Theatre Club in New York City.
