= Reza Abdoh =

American dramatist (1963–1995)

- رضا عبده
- Reza Abdoh in the early 1990s
- Born: February 23, 1963; Tehran, Iran
- Died: May 11, 1995 (aged 32); New York City, US
- Education: University of Southern California
- Occupations: Theatre director and playwright
- Years active: 1983–1995
- Father: Ali Abdoh
- Relatives: Salar Abdoh (brother)

Reza Abdoh (Persian: رضا عبده; also Romanized as "Rezā Abdoh", Persian pronunciation: [ɾeˈzɒː æbˈdoh]) (February 23, 1963 – May 11, 1995) was an Iranian-born director and playwright known for large-scale, experimental theatrical productions, often staged in unusual spaces like warehouses and abandoned buildings.

== Early life and family ==
Abdoh was born in Tehran in 1963, the first child of Ali Abdoh, a prominent athlete, businessman and founder of the Persepolis Football Club, and Homa Oboodi (née Mohajerin). His paternal grandfather was Mohammad Abdoh Boroujerdi, a chief justice and expert in Islamic law in the Reza Shah era.

Abdoh had two brothers, Sardar "Sid" Abdoh and Salar Abdoh, and one sister, Negar. He had one half-sister, Regina, from his father's previous marriage to an American woman. On his father's side, he was first cousins once removed with Dara Khosrowshahi. In 1977, Reza was sent to England where he attended day school in London while living with his grandmother. In 1978, he was sent to Wellington, an exclusive boarding school in Somerset, England.

In the wake of the Iranian Revolution, Ali Abdoh traveled to California with his four children and settled in West Covina, California. Reza's father, who had plans to open a hotel in Iran on the eve of the revolution, faced financial ruin. He began classes at University of Southern California where he completed one semester. In January 1980, Ali Abdoh died of a heart attack on a squash court at the Los Angeles Athletic Club. It is said that he died not long after discovering that Reza was gay.

== Career ==
In 1983 Abdoh began directing plays, often adapting classics like King Lear, King Oedipus, and Medea in Los Angeles theaters.

In 1990, Abdoh directed Father Was a Peculiar Man, a multimedia performance produced by En Garde Arts featuring more than 50 performers that occurred across four blocks of New York City's Meatpacking District. That year he also wrote and directed The Hip-Hop Waltz of Eurydice, staged at the Los Angeles Theatre Center. Abdoh called it a "gut reaction to systemic repression and erosion of freedom" in an interview with Thomas Leabhart published in Mime Journal. His work often confronted such issues as race, class and, the AIDS crisis.

Abdoh worked on several productions with the New York City and Los Angeles theater ensemble Dar a Luz, which he formed in 1991. Productions with the company included The Law of Remains (1992), Tight Right White (1993) and Quotations From a Ruined City (1994), co-written with his brother, Salar Abdoh. His later work was called "nightmarish" and used multimedia elements with downtown theater conventions to "bombard" audiences. New York Times critic Stephen Holden called Abdoh "a theatrical visionary" in his obituary.

Abdoh was known for his use of video in his sets, and he also created several videos between 1986 and 1991. In 1992 Abdoh wrote and directed the feature-length film The Blind Owl.

== Death ==
Abdoh died due to causes related to AIDS on May 11, 1995.

== Legacy ==
He is the subject of the book Reza Abdoh, edited by Daniel Mufson; his papers and videotapes of some performances are kept at the New York Public Library for the Performing Arts.

Reza Abdoh: Theatre Visionary, a documentary film about Abdoh and his work, was completed by director Adam Soch in 2016.

In 2018, MoMA PS1 hosted a retrospective exhibition titled Reza Abdoh curated by Negar Azimi, Tiffany Malakooti, and Babak Radboy of Bidoun with Klaus Biesenbach. In 2025, some of his video works were screened in Brooklyn, at KAJE and Spectacle Theatre.

A chapter on Reza Abdoh, written by Joseph Cermatori, is included in 50 Key Figures in Queer US Theatre (2022).

== Performances ==
- Three Plays (Pristine Love, Heads, and Saliva Milkshake), written by Howard Brenton, 1983
- King Lear, written by William Shakespeare, 1984
- The Farmyard, written by Franz Xaver Kroetz, 1985
- The Sound of a Voice and As the Crow Flies, written by David Henry Hwang, directed by Abdoh, 1985
- A Medea: Requiem for a Boy with a White White Toy, adapted from Euripides, 1986
- Rusty Sat on a Hill One Dawn and Watched the Moon Go Down, 1986
- King Oedipus, adapted from Sophocles, 1987
- Eva Peron, written by Copi, 1987
- Peep Show, written by Mira-Lani Oglesby and Reza Abdoh, 1988
- Minamata, written by Mira-Lani Oglesby and Reza Abdoh, 1989
- Father Was a Peculiar Man, written by Mira-Lani Oglesby and Reza Abdoh, 1990
- The Hip-Hop Waltz of Eurydice, 1990
- Pasos en la Obscuridad, written by Frank Ambriz and Reza Abdoh, 1990
- Bogeyman, 1991
- The Law of Remains, 1992
- Simon Boccanegra, written by Giuseppe Verdi, 1992
- Tight Right White, 1993
- Quotations from a Ruined City, written by Salar Abdoh and Reza Abdoh, 1994
- A Story of Infamy, written by Salar Abdoh and Reza Abdoh, did not reach production due to Abdoh's death

== Film and video ==
- My Face, short, 1988
- Sleeping with the Devil, short, 1990
- The Weeping Song, short, 1991
- Daddy's Girl, short, 1991
- The Blind Owl, feature film, 1992
- The Tryst, unfinished feature film, 1993
- Train Project, unfinished film
