= William Bassett (d. 1667) =

William Bassett (c. 1590 – 1667) was an English artisan and a colonial migrant to North America.

Bassett came to Plymouth Colony on board the ship Fortune in November 1621. During his long life he was involved in many colony governmental activities and business ventures, being one of the original members of the "Purchaser" investment group of 1626. In his later years he described himself as a blacksmith, but writer Charles Banks indicates that in addition to being a worker in metals, he was also a gunsmith.

According to historian Eugene Aubrey Stratton, in records of the time, his last name was also spelled as "Basset", and Stratton uses this spelling in his book about Plymouth Colony. Other historical records show his name spelled "Bassett".

== Early life ==
Little is known of his life in England, although he was believed to have been born in there sometime before 1600, and possibly as early as about 1590. He was a Pilgrim from St. Peter's parish, Sandwich, Kent.

At some point Bassett was a Leiden Separatist and was recorded there as a master mason from Sandwich, Kent. Although some historians disagree, most sources agree that William Bassett was from Sandwich and lived in Leiden, Holland in 1611, where he was betrothed there to Mary Butler, with William Brewster, Roger Wilson, Anna Fuller, and Rose Lisle to be witnesses, but Mary died before the marriage. He was then betrothed on July 29, 1611, to Margaret Oldham; they were married August 13 of that year with Edward Southworth, Roger Wilson, Elizabeth Neal, and Wybra Pontus as witnesses.

== Life in New England ==
William Bassett arrived in Plymouth in November 1621 on the ship Fortune, most probably with his wife Elizabeth, although according to author Charles Banks, he was unmarried upon arrival.

In the Land Division of 1623 he was allotted two acres indicating he had taken a wife before that date. Wife Elizabeth and his children William and Elizabeth were in the 1627 division, but his wife died later.

In Governor William Bradford's Letter Book, Bassett is one of 27 names of those men who were creditors hoping to realize profit from the colony and who signed an agreement as "Purchasers" to allow privileges to the eight Undertakers (colony leaders Bradford, Standish, Isaac Allerton, Edward Winslow, William Brewster, John Howland, John Alden and Thomas Prence) in return for their assumption of the colony debt. Bassett was a signatory on this agreement as "William Basset". The Undertakers being colony leaders who assumed the colony debt from the London Adventurers in return for a monopoly of the fur trade.

He moved to Duxbury by 1637, and to Bridgewater by 1656.

He served on a number of juries and committees, and was a deputy for Duxbury to the Plymouth court.

He was a blacksmith, and a number of smith's tools are listed in his inventory, which also contained a number of theological books.

In 1658, in records of the time, William Bassett is listed as the Constable of Sandwich.

On November 8, 1666, William Bassett, who described himself as a blacksmith of Bridgewater, sold four lots to John Sprague of Duxbury, and Bassett's wife Mary gave her consent. John Sprague was the husband of Bassett's daughter Ruth.

== Family ==
Bassett wed four times:

- In 1611 he was a widower of Cecily Light, Leiden. He is shown as a hodman from Sandwich, Kent in Leiden betrothal to Mary Butler who died before the third banns. He was a Pilgrim from St. Peter's, Sandwich.
- Margaret Oldham on August 13, 1611, in Leiden. She possibly died before 1621.
- Elizabeth Neil by 1621 in Leiden. She died sometime after 1634.
- Mary (Tilden) Lapham after June 5, 1651, and before December 12, 1664. She was still living in Bridgewater on March 28, 1690.

Children of William and Elizabeth Bassett:

- William was born in Plymouth about 1624 and died in Sandwich on May 29, 1670. He married Mary Rainsford by about 1652 and had three children.
- Elizabeth was born in Plymouth about 1626. She married Thomas Burgess on November 8, 1648, in Sandwich. They divorced June 1661 in the first divorce in Plymouth Colony. He was brought to court for an act of uncleanness with Lydia Gaunt and the court allowed Elizabeth to keep small things "that are in William Bassett's hands".
- Sarah was born in Plymouth about 1628 and died on January 20, 1711/12. She married Mayflower passenger Peregrine White, son of Pilgrim William White and brother of Mayflower passenger Resolved White, before March 6, 1648/9. They had seven children and resided in Marshfield. She and her husband were buried in Winslow Cemetery, Marshfield. Peregrine White's step-father was Pilgrim Edward Winslow. A memorial stone was erected in Winslow Cemetery in honor of Peregrine White, his brother Resolved and their wives Sarah and Judith, daughter of William Vassall, as well as others prominent in early Plymouth Colony.
- Nathaniel was born about 1630 and died on January 17, 1710/11. He lived first in Marshfield and then in Yarmouth. He had ten children.

He married:
1. Dorcas Joyce, daughter of John Joyce, about 1661.
2. Hannah _____.

- Joseph was born about 1632 and died in 1712. He had eight children.

He married:
1. Mary ____ by about 16??.
2. Martha Hobart on October 16, 1677.

- Ruth was born about 1634 and died after March 22, 1693/94.

She married:
1. John Sprague, son of Francis Sprague, by 1655 and had seven children.
2. _____ Thomas.

Note: the burial place of all of Bassett's children is unknown with the exception of Sarah.

== Will and Death of William Bassett ==
In his will dated April 3, 1667, William Bassett mentioned his unnamed wife, his son Joseph, and his son William's son William. He died sometime between the date of his will and the date his will was sworn, June 5, 1667. It is assumed he died sometime shortly after the will was written. His wife Mary swore to his inventory. The burial place of William Bassett is unknown.

== Estate of William Bassett ==
On June 2, 1669, William Bassett of Sandwich, oldest son of William Bassett, sometime of Bridgewater, deceased, confirmed land to his youngest brother, Joseph Bassett of Bridgewater.

On June 6, 1683, Goodwife Sprague (Ruth Bassett) and her son John agreed about land which formerly belonged to John Sprague's grandfather (William) Bassett.
