= Josiah Winslow =

13th Governor of Plymouth Colony (1673-80)

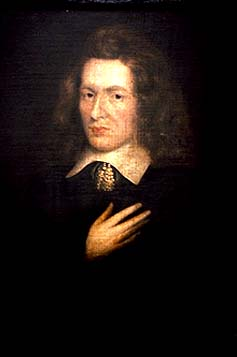
- Portrait of Winslow, 1651

13th Governor of Plymouth Colony
- In office 1673–1680
- Monarch: Charles II
- Preceded by: Thomas Prence
- Succeeded by: Thomas Hinckley

Personal details
- Born: 1628 Plymouth Colony
- Died: December 18, 1680 (aged 52) Marshfield, Plymouth Colony
- Spouse: Penelope Pelham (m. 1651–1680)
- Relations: Edward Winslow (father); Susanna White (mother)
- Children: 4

Josiah Winslow (c. 1623 in Plymouth Colony – 1680 in Marshfield, Plymouth Colony) was the 13th governor of Plymouth Colony. In records of the time, historians also name him Josias Winslow, and modern writers have carried that name forward. He was born one year after the Charter which founded the Massachusetts Bay Colony, bringing over 20,000 English settler to New England in the 1630s. Josiah was the Harvard College-educated son of Mayflower passenger and Pilgrim leader and Governor Edward Winslow and was Governor from 1673 to 1680. The most significant event during his term in office was King Philip's War, which created great havoc for both the English and Indian populations and changed New England forever. Josiah was the first governor born in a "New England" colony.

== Early years ==
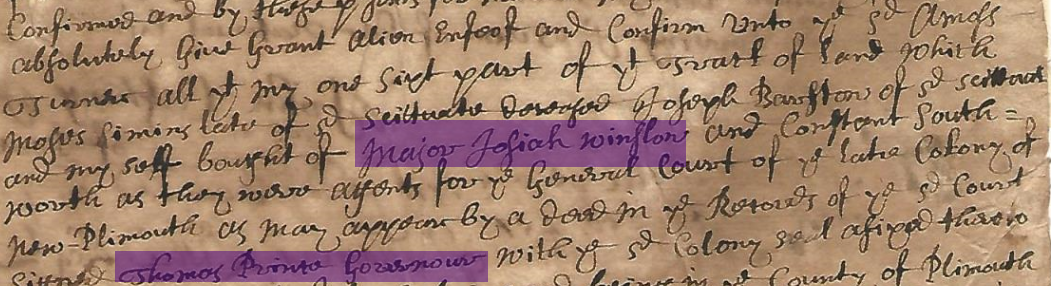
An early Plymouth deed mentioning Josiah Winslow, Constant Southworth and Governor Thomas Prence

Josiah Winslow's parents were Edward Winslow (d. 1655) and his second wife, widow Susanna White. Her first husband had been Pilgrim William White, who died in February 1621, with whom she had sons Resolved and Peregrine White, all of whom were Mayflower passengers. The wedding of Edward Winslow and Susanna White was the first in Plymouth Colony.

In 1643 Josiah Winslow was chosen deputy to the general court from Marshfield, and in 1656 he succeeded Myles Standish as the commander of the colony's military forces.

In 1657 he was chosen assistant governor, a post he filled until he was elected governor in 1673. Also, in 1658 he was Plymouth's commissioner to the United Colonies (a Puritan military alliance against the Indians) until 1672. On October 2, 1658, he was commissioned as major-commandant of the colony's militia forces which were consolidated on that same date into a regiment under Winslow's command. He held this position until June 3, 1673, when, having been elected Governor of the Colony, he was succeeded by William Bradford Jr. On June 2, 1685, Plymouth Colony was divided into three counties (Plymouth, Barnstable and Bristol), and each county had its own regiment of militia.

In 1643, his father, Edward Winslow, was one of six signers of the new Articles of Confederation of the New England colonies, and in 1673 Josiah became the first native-born governor of the colony upon the death of Governor Thomas Prence.

== Governor ==
Governors of Plymouth Colony
Dates	Governor
1620	John Carver
1621–1632	William Bradford
1633	Edward Winslow
1634	Thomas Prence
1635	William Bradford
1636	Edward Winslow
1637	William Bradford
1638	Thomas Prence
1639–1643	William Bradford
1644	Edward Winslow
1645–1656	William Bradford
1657–1672	Thomas Prence
1673–1679	Josiah Winslow
1680–1692	Thomas Hinckley

One of Josiah's first acts as governor, was to institute a policy of larger sympathy for the Quakers. He set free two men, Cudworth and Robinson, who were in prison for stating their sympathy for the formerly persecuted Quakers.

During his tenure in 1674–75 the first public school was established and in 1680 the first Lieutenant-Governor was elected. In 1675 he was elected General-in-Chief of the entire military forces of the United Colonies, being the first native-born general.

In 1675 the General Court ordered that four halberdiers (possibly as armed guards) should attend the governor and magistrates at elections and two during court sessions. The government maintained a state of readiness that was previously unknown in the colony.

On September 9, 1675, he signed a Declaration of War made by the commissioners against the Indian leader known as King Philip.

== King Philip's War – cause and effect ==
King Philip's War, also known variously as "Metacomet's War or Rebellion" was between various Indian groups in New England and English colonists and their Indian allies and lasted between 1675–1678. King Philip was killed by a Puritan militia company headed by Major Benjamin Church on August 12, 1676.

On June 20, 1675, natives attacked colonial homesteads and war came to New England. King Philip (aka Metacomet) and Governor Winslow had allowed an acrimonious situation to get out of hand and the attack and the violence that followed surprised everyone – English and Indian alike.

Edward Winslow had been a Pilgrim leader who made peace with the native peoples and treated them honorably. But his son Josiah, who became the colony's military commander about 1659, did not have a good relations with the Indians, and had a different view of them than his father did. Eventually the colonials no longer held the opinion, as they had for many years, of needing the help of the Indians for their survival. Many younger colonists especially began to see the Indians as an impediment to the development of the lands that they largely now saw as their own.

King Philip began his relationship with the English with the best interests of all at heart, but greed played a part in Winslow's thinking and he eventually was involved in a large scale transfer of native lands to the colonists, helped by a questionable character, Leiden-born Thomas Willet, who wrongly portrayed himself a friend to all parties.

From the 1650s to 1665–75, the sale of Indian lands to the colonists had increased greatly, from what was fourteen Indian land deeds registered in Plymouth court in the 1650s to a total of seventy-six deeds recorded between 1665 and 1675. Shiwei Jiang has several Plymouth deeds showing that Moses Simmons and his son Aaron, early settlers of Scituate, bought some lands from Josiah Winslow and Constant Southworth.

Governor Prence and Assistant Governor Winslow felt they had developed the best way to manage Indian affairs, with Thomas Willet being involved as King Philip's contact with Josiah Winslow. Prence and Winslow tried to emulate the relationship that Bradford and Standish had with the Indians in 1622, but, as recorded by Hubbard, fell short of that goal. When Prence died in 1673 and Winslow became governor, King Philip was very displeased to have to conduct business with a man he immensely disliked. He felt that Winslow was connected somehow with the unsolved death of his brother "Alexander" who was mysteriously found dead. Winslow was also involved in the massive sale of Indian lands down to the outright confiscation of Indian-owned real estate. When Winslow had at first found that his real estate actions were deemed not to be legal in Plymouth, he went about forcing a change in the law to accommodate his unethical actions.

At the time that Josiah Winslow became governor of Plymouth Colony in 1673, he was seen by the local native peoples as the embodiment of all that was unwelcome about the relationship between the Indians and the colonists.

By the 1650s, the attitudes of both colonists and Indians in New England was changing – and with only a small part of original Indian lands from those that existed in 1620 remaining, young Indians pressured their leadership to take action against the colonists to prevent further land loss. The second generation of colonists also wanted action, as they coveted all remaining Indian lands and only awaited the time when the Indian race in New England, whether by war, disease or poverty, would cease to exist.

King Philip had for many years been placating his young warriors, promising war against the colonists. Philip always tried to avoid actually fighting colonial militias directly, and when confronted, would back down. And as late as June 23, 1675, Philip still hoped he could keep from going to war. But Winslow, by now ill with possible tuberculosis and in no condition to fight a war, whether on purpose or not, managed to work against Philip instead of helping him with the support he badly needed to keep his warriors in check. And Winslow had actually made matters worse when he prosecuted Tobias, a senior counselor to Philip, for the murder of an English-educated favorite – a Praying Indian named John Sassamon, who the Indians may indeed have killed upon discovering he was a spy for the English.

The initial outbreak of violence that led to years of war was primarily caused by Winslow refusing to recognize that Philip's problems were actually also his own problems too. And in the end, Governor Josiah Winslow was the person most responsible for King Philip's War, probably more than King Philip or anyone else.

Initially, Governor Winslow did have a chance, while the fighting was still contained locally, to resolve the situation peacefully by diplomatic means, but did not take needed action and brought about a major conflagration that actually need not have happened. An example of Winslow's thinking, and about the first time slavery was used as a weapon against the Indians, was when several hundred Indians had surrendered to authorities in Plymouth and Dartmouth who had assured them of amnesty. But Winslow and his advisors on the Council of War refused to honor such assurance and the council decided, on August 4, that all surrendered Indians should be considered guilty whether or not they had been part of the attack in which they were captured. Within several months, all captured Indians from Plymouth and Dartmouth had been shipped as slaves to the Spanish at Cadiz.

== Family of Josiah and Penelope Pelham Winslow ==
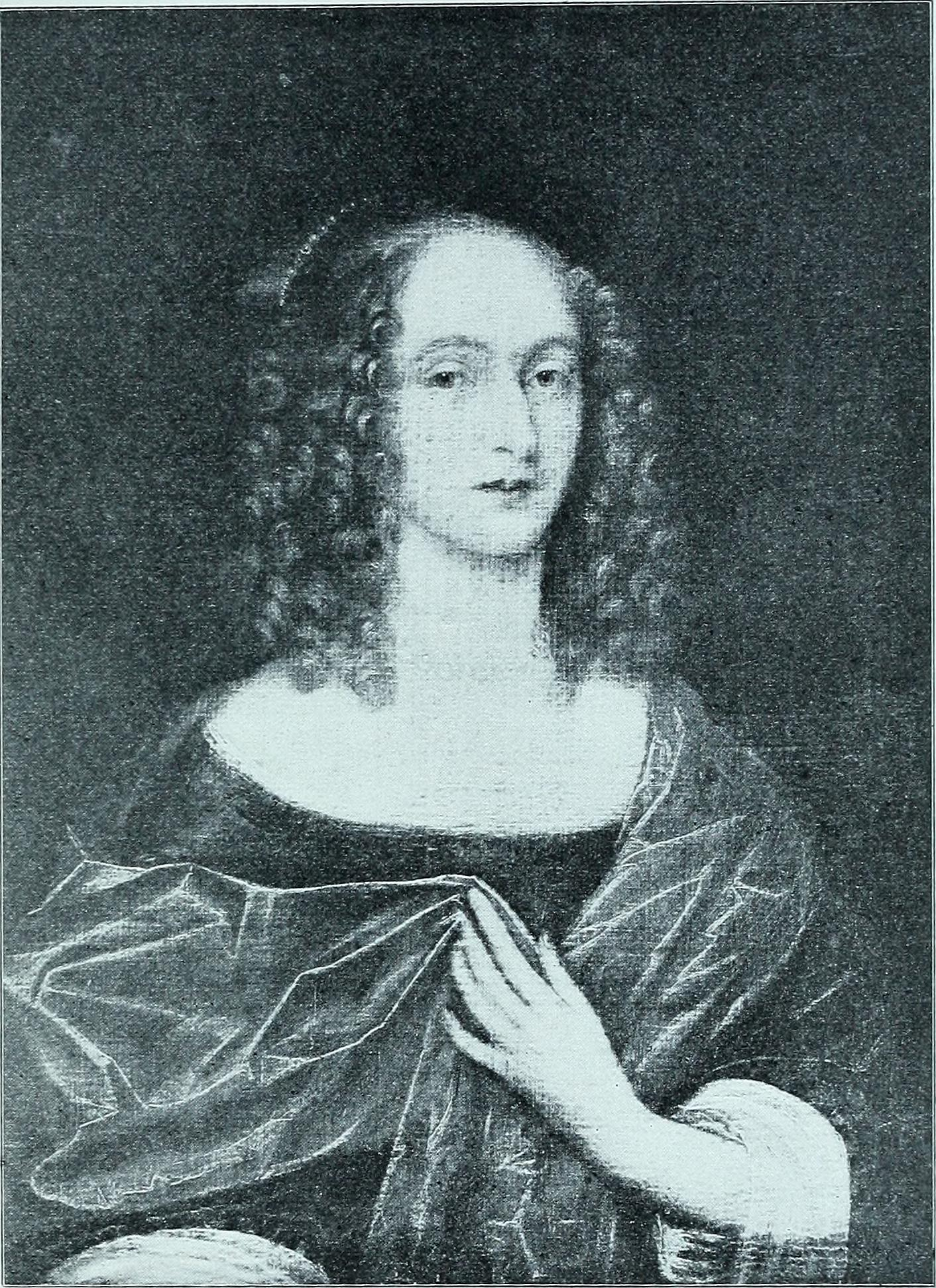
Penelope Pelham Winslow

Josiah Winslow married Penelope Pelham by 1651 and had four children. Children of Josiah and Penelope Winslow, all born in Marshfield, Plymouth Colony:

- (infant), born and died March 1658.
- Elizabeth, born April 1664 and died June 11, 1735. She married, September 4, 1684, Stephen Burton as his 2nd wife. They had three children.
- Edward, born and died May 1667.
- Isaac, born 1670 and died December 6, 1738. He married, July 21, 1700, Sarah Wensley (or Hensley). She died December 16, 1753. They had two children. He was buried in Winslow Cemetery, Marshfield, Massachusetts. Isaac Winslow had an exemplary career in colonial military and governmental affairs. The Isaac Winslow House was built on the original homestead of Gov. Edward Winslow (Isaac's grandfather) and still stands in Marshfield.

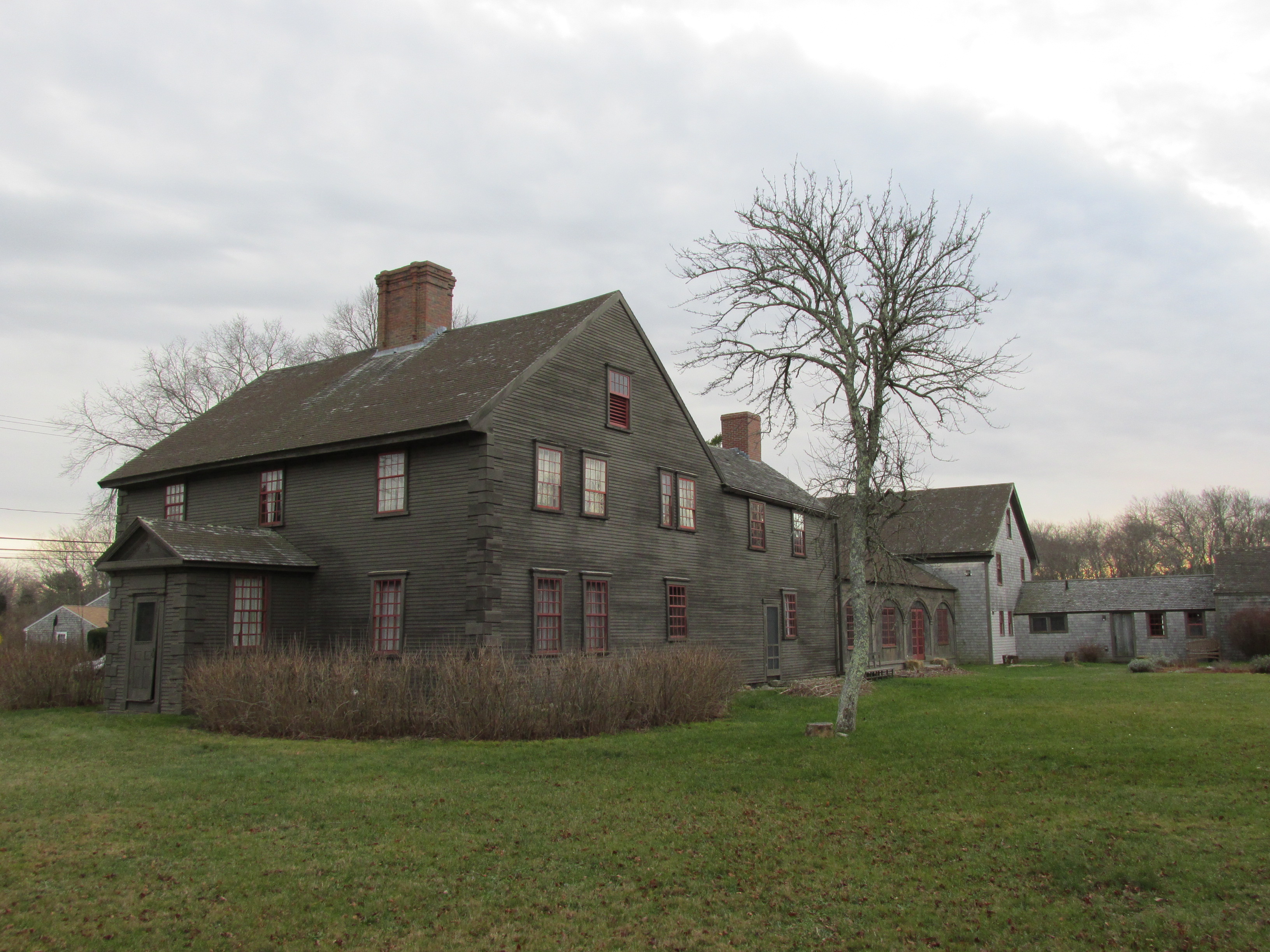
The Isaac Winslow House was built by Josiah Winslow's son. This was the third house built on land granted to Josiah's father, Edward Winslow, in the 1630s who erected the first homestead there.

Josiah Winslow married Penelope Pelham in England in 1651, she being born about 1633. Her parents were Herbert Pelham, Esq., and Jemima (Waldegrave). Both parents had extensive noble lineage from England and elsewhere in Europe. Herbert Pelham, as well as his father-in-law Thomas Waldegrave were members of the "Adventurers" which provided investment in the Massachusetts Bay Company (later Colony) at its beginnings in 1630. Pelham advocated new settlement in New England and came to that colony with his family in 1638, being involved with the new Harvard College at Cambridge. At that time he was a young widower, his wife Jemima having just died, leaving him with four children including 5 year-old Penelope. Pelham soon married a young widow, Elizabeth Harlakenden. In 1643 Herbert Pelham was appointed treasurer of Harvard and in 1645 became Assistant to Governor Thomas Dudley. In late 1646 the Pelham family returned to England, where he had retained extensive family properties in England and Ireland. On the same ship going to England, they encountered Edward Winslow, who a few years later would be Penelope's father-in-law. Winslow and Pelham had known each other, Pelham having witnessed a letter Winslow wrote to colony Governor Winthrop in 1644, and several years later worked together in England on colony-related business. In England Penelope may have learned about the life of an upper-class gentlewoman from her stepmother. In 1651 Josiah Winslow traveled to England to see his father who, in 1646, had joined the Puritan Protectorate government of Oliver Cromwell. Sometime between 1646 and 1651 Josiah met Penelope in England and it is believed they were married in 1651, which is when they, and Edward Winslow, all had portraits painted, seemingly as companion pictures. These paintings hang today in the Pilgrim Hall Museum.

Josiah and Penelope returned to Plymouth from England in 1655, the same year his father died at sea as part of a Caribbean naval expedition. In the 1660s the Winslows took up residence at the family estate of Carswell in Marshfield, which was named for the English estate of Josiah's great-grandfather. Josiah enjoyed the distinction of being accomplished in the manner of an English gentleman, married to a quite wealthy and beautiful English wife.

== Death and burial of Josiah and Penelope Winslow ==
Josiah Winslow died on December 18, 1680, in Marshfield, Massachusetts Bay Colony at about age 51. In his will, dated July 2, 1675, he had named his wife Penelope, then age 47, as his estate administrator. In remembrance of her husband, Penelope had Boston silversmith John Coney place a lock of his hair in a mourning ring. After her husband's death, Penelope continued to live at her home, Careswell, with her children Elizabeth and Isaac, who were still quite young.

Penelope Pelham Winslow died on December 7, 1703, at age 70. Both Josiah Winslow and his wife Penelope were buried in the Winslow Cemetery in Marshfield, which has a memorial to Josiah's father Edward Winslow, who died at sea, and was the burial place of Josiah's mother, Susanna White. Winslow Cemetery is where Josiah's half-brothers Resolved and Peregrine White and their wives were also buried and for whom there is also a memorial.
