= Mayflower Society =

Nonprofit hereditary lineage society

General Society of Mayflower Descendants
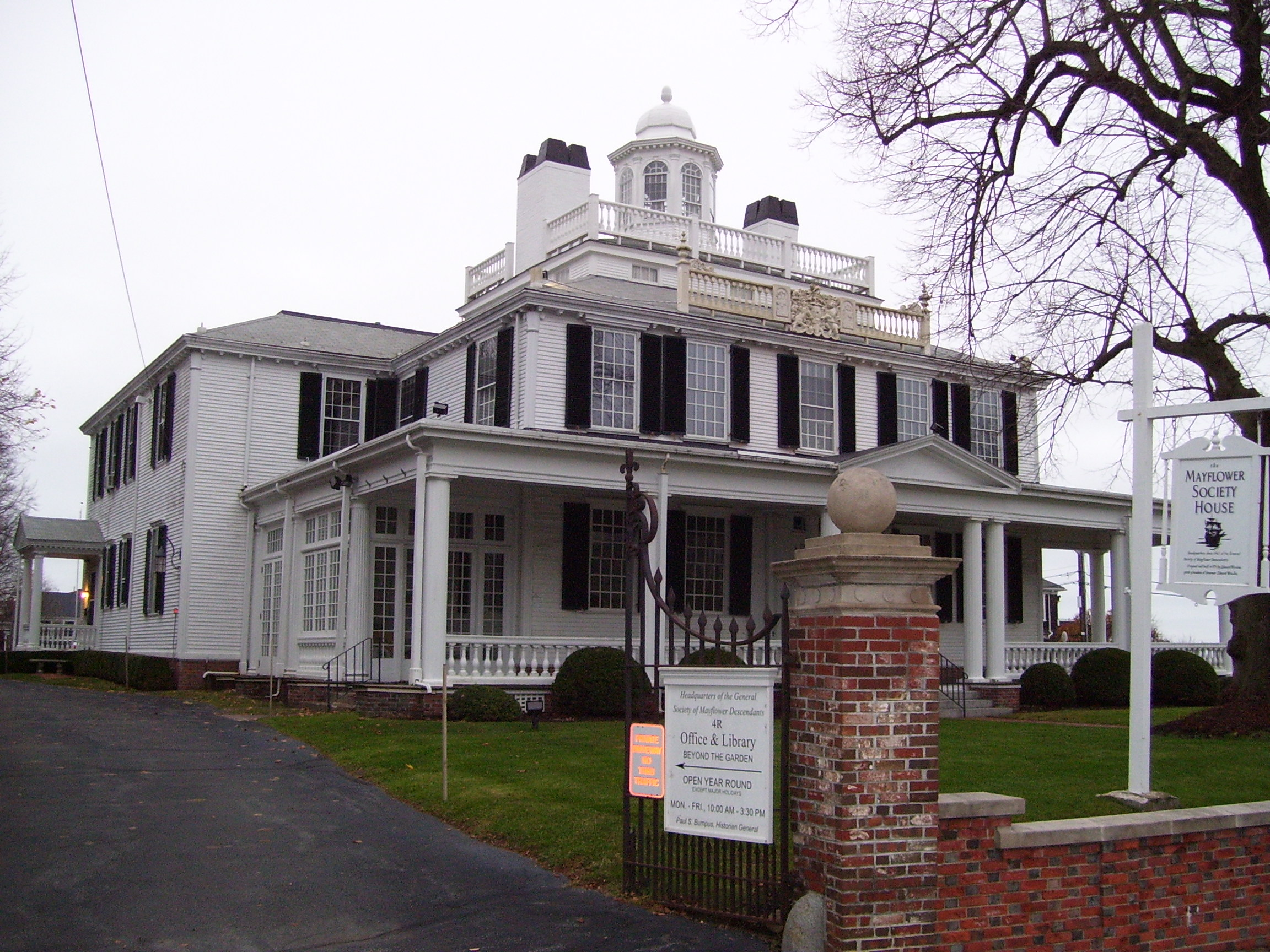
- Mayflower House Museum in Plymouth, Massachusetts
- Abbreviation: GSMD
- Formation: January 12, 1897
- Founder: State societies of New York, Connecticut, Massachusetts, and Pennsylvania
- Type: Hereditary lineage society
- Legal status: Nonprofit organization
- Purpose: Documenting Mayflower lineage and educating the public about Pilgrim history
- Headquarters: Plymouth, Massachusetts
- Region served: United States, Canada, Europe, Australia
- Members: Over 31,000
- Governor General: (position listed on GSMD website; name varies by term)
- Main organ: General Congress
- Website: www.themayflowersociety.org

The General Society of Mayflower Descendants (GSMD), commonly known as the Mayflower Society, is a hereditary lineage organization founded in 1897 in Plymouth, Massachusetts. The Society documents and preserves the lineal descent of the 102 passengers who arrived on the Mayflower in 1620 and promotes education about the Pilgrims’ role in early American history. GSMD includes 54 Member Societies across the United States, Canada, Europe, and Australia and has more than 31,000 members.

== History ==
Interest in commemorating the Pilgrims grew during the American centennial in 1876.

The first Society of Mayflower Descendants was founded in New York City on December 22, 1894. Three additional state societies were established in 1896: Connecticut (March 7), Massachusetts (March 28), and Pennsylvania (July 1). Delegates from these four societies met in Plymouth, Massachusetts, on January 12, 1897, to form the General Society of Mayflower Descendants.

== Organization ==
GSMD’s mission is to research and document the lineal descent of the Mayflower Pilgrims and to educate the public about their historical significance.

=== Governance ===
The Society is governed by the triennial General Congress, the General Board of Assistants (GBOA), and the Executive Committee. A staff of more than twenty employees works at the headquarters in Plymouth, Massachusetts.

GSMD is also listed as an approved lineage society with the Hereditary Society Community of the United States of America.

=== Member societies ===
GSMD consists of 54 Member Societies, formerly known as State Societies, located in all 50 U.S. states, the District of Columbia, Canada, Europe, and Australia.

Internationally, GSMD recognizes several affiliated societies that represent members outside the United States. These include the Canadian Society of Mayflower Descendants, the Australian Society of Mayflower Descendants, and the Society of Mayflower Descendants in Europe, each of which operates under GSMD guidelines while serving members in their respective regions.

=== Family societies ===
GSMD also formally recognizes a number of Mayflower Family Societies, independent organizations dedicated to the descendants of specific Mayflower passengers. These groups collaborate with GSMD on lineage research, historical education, and heritage preservation. Examples include the Alden Kindred of America (John Alden), the Elder William Brewster Society, the Pilgrim John Howland Society, the Soule Kindred in America, the Society of Myles Standish Descendants, and Warren Cousins, which represents descendants of Richard Warren. These Family Societies are officially acknowledged by GSMD as part of the broader Mayflower heritage community.

== Membership ==
Membership is open to individuals who can document direct lineal descent from a Mayflower passenger. Applications are submitted through one of the 54 Member Societies.

Applications for membership in GSMD are submitted through one of the 54 Member Societies and must demonstrate direct lineal descent from a passenger on the Mayflower. Applicants are required to provide primary documentation for each generational link, including vital records, probate files, land records, and other genealogical evidence. Member Societies review applications locally before forwarding approved submissions to GSMD for final verification.

GSMD places particular emphasis on the use of its published lineage resources, commonly known as the “Silver Books.” These volumes, formally titled Mayflower Families Through Five Generations, document the first five generations of descendants for each Mayflower passenger and serve as authoritative reference works for establishing lineage. While applicants must still provide documentation for later generations, the Silver Books significantly streamline the verification process by supplying thoroughly researched and GSMD‑approved information for early generations.

=== Silver Books ===
The "Silver Books," formally titled Mayflower Families Through Five Generations, are GSMD's authoritative lineage publications documenting the first five generations of descendants for each Mayflower passenger. They serve as foundational reference works for membership applications and are widely used by genealogists and researchers.

Passenger	Volume(s)	Notes
William White	Vol. 1	Covers descendants of William White; includes Susanna (Jackson) White Winslow.
Susanna (Jackson) White Winslow	Vol. 1	Included with William White.
George Soule	Vol. 3	Covers descendants of George Soule.
Edward Fuller	Vol. 4	Covers Edward Fuller and his descendants.
Henry Samson	Vol. 5	Documents descendants of Henry Samson.
Stephen Hopkins	Vol. 6	Covers descendants of Stephen Hopkins.
Myles Standish	Vol. 8	Documents descendants of Captain Myles Standish.
Samuel Fuller (physician)	Vol. 10	Documents descendants of Samuel Fuller, brother of Edward.
Edward Doty	Vol. 11, Parts 1–3	One of the largest Silver Book sets due to Doty’s many descendants.
Francis Cooke	Vol. 12, Parts 1–2	Covers Francis Cooke and his descendants.
Francis Eaton	Vol. 13	Covers descendants of Francis Eaton.
Richard More	Vol. 14	Documents descendants of Richard More.
William Mullins	Vol. 15	Covers descendants of William Mullins.
John Alden	Vol. 16, Parts 1–3	Covers John Alden and his descendants.
Isaac Allerton	Vol. 17, Part 1	Includes Isaac Allerton and his documented descendants.
Mary (Norris) Allerton	Vol. 17, Part 2	Covers the Allerton family through Mary (Norris) Allerton.
John Billington	Vol. 18	Documents descendants of John Billington.
Richard Warren	Vol. 18, Parts 1–2	One of the largest Silver Book sets due to Warren’s extensive descendant lines.
Thomas Rogers	Vol. 19	Covers descendants of Thomas Rogers.
Moses Fletcher	Vol. 20	Documents descendants of Moses Fletcher.
Degory Priest	Vol. 21	Documents descendants of Degory Priest.
William Bradford	Vol. 22	Covers descendants of Governor William Bradford.
John Howland	Vol. 23, Parts 1–3	One of the most extensive Silver Book sets due to Howland’s large family.
William Brewster	Vol. 24, Parts 1–2	Extensive coverage of Elder William Brewster’s descendants.
Edward Winslow	Vol. 25	Documents descendants of Edward Winslow.
John Tilley	Vol. 27	Covers descendants of John Tilley and wife Joan Hurst Tilley.
Peter Browne	Vol. 30	Documents descendants of Peter Browne.

== Programs and activities ==
GSMD sponsors genealogical, educational, and preservation initiatives, including:

- Research Services – professional genealogical assistance.
- Mayflower Lineage Match – a verification tool for previously documented lines.
- Mayflower Meetinghouse Project – an immersive museum and multimedia educational center under development.
- 1620 Club – a donor society supporting GSMD’s preservation and educational mission.

=== Patriots to Passengers Project ===
The Patriots to Passengers Project is an initiative that documents lineage connections between Mayflower passengers and individuals who later served as Patriots during the American Revolution. The project highlights how families descended from the 1620 colonists contributed to the founding of the United States more than a century and a half later. GSMD maintains a growing list of documented connections and encourages researchers to submit newly verified lines for inclusion.

State-level lineage organizations also participate in expanding the project. The Virginia Society of the Sons of the American Revolution maintains a complementary research effort that identifies Virginians who descend from both Mayflower passengers and Revolutionary War Patriots, contributing additional documentation and encouraging public engagement with the project’s goals.

==== Pilgrim Academic Research Award ====
GSMD sponsors the Pilgrim Academic Research Award to encourage advanced scholarship on the Pilgrims, the Mayflower migration, and early Plymouth Colony. The award supports original academic research by graduate students and emerging scholars whose work contributes to a deeper understanding of seventeenth‑century New England. GSMD evaluates submissions based on historical rigor, use of primary sources, and relevance to the Society’s educational mission.

Recipients of the award have represented a range of academic institutions and research specialties, and some have published or presented their work in professional historical venues. As GSMD continues to expand its educational outreach, the Pilgrim Academic Research Award serves as a key component of the Society’s efforts to promote scholarly engagement with Mayflower history and its broader cultural legacy.

The following individuals have received the Pilgrim Academic Research Award:

Year	Recipient
2025	Blaine Bettinger
2024	Christopher C. Child
2023	Peggy M. Baker
2022	Richard H. Pickering
2021	Judith H. Swan
2019	Caleb H. Johnson
2018	Susan E. Roser
2017	Dr. Jeremy Dupertuis Bangs
2016	Dr. David Landon and Dr. Christa Beranek
2015	James W. Baker

== List of Pilgrims and other passengers with known descendants ==
This list includes Mayflower passengers known to have living descendants, as documented by GSMD.

- John Alden
- Priscilla (Mullins) Alden
- Bartholomew Allerton
- Isaac Allerton
- Mary (Norris) Allerton
- Mary (Allerton) Cushman
- Remember (Allerton) Maverick
- Elinor Billington
- Francis Billington
- John Billington
- William Bradford
- Love Brewster
- Mary Brewster
- William Brewster
- Peter Browne
- James Chilton
- Mrs. Chilton
- Mary (Chilton) Winslow
- Francis Cooke
- John Cooke
- Edward Doty
- Francis Eaton
- Samuel Eaton
- Sarah Eaton
- Moses Fletcher
- Edward Fuller
- Mrs. Fuller
- Samuel Fuller (son of Edward)
- Samuel Fuller (brother of Edward)
- Constance (Hopkins) Snow
- Giles Hopkins
- Stephen Hopkins
- Elizabeth (Fisher) Hopkins
- John Howland
- Richard More
- William Mullins
- Degory Priest
- Joseph Rogers
- Thomas Rogers
- Henry Samson
- George Soule
- Myles Standish
- Elizabeth (Tilley) Howland
- John Tilley
- Joan (Hurst) Tilley
- Richard Warren
- Peregrine White
- Resolved White
- Susanna (Jackson) White Winslow
- William White
- Edward Winslow

== Museum ==
In 1941 the Society purchased the Edward Winslow House in Plymouth, Massachusetts. The mansion, built in 1754, is operated as the Mayflower House Museum, an 18th‑century historic house museum with period furnishings. The GSMD headquarters and genealogical library are located behind the mansion.

== Notable members ==
- Sarah Gertrude Banks, American physician and suffragist
- Jeannette Osborn Baylies, 31st president general of the Daughters of the American Revolution
- Ada Brown, United States federal judge for the Northern District of Texas
- William P. Carey, philanthropist and businessman who is the namesake for the Johns Hopkins Carey Business School, the University of Maryland Francis King Carey School of Law, the Arizona State University W. P. Carey School of Business, and the University of Pennsylvania Carey Law School
- Anna Matilda Larrabee, American social leader and First Lady of Iowa
- Harriet Wright O'Leary (1916–1999) first woman elected to serve on the Choctaw Tribal Council and one-time governor of the Oklahoma Mayflower Society chapter.
- Edith Scott Magna, American civic leader and 15th president general of the Daughters of the American Revolution
- Maria Purdy Peck, American essayist and social economist
- Arthur M. Schlesinger Jr., American intellectual and Pulitzer Prize for Biography winner
- Phyllis J. Wilson, Command Chief Warrant Officer of the US Army Reserve and president of the Military Women's Memorial
- George Warren (died 1933), last surviving founding member

== See also ==
- List of Mayflower passengers
