= Winslow Cemetery =

Historic cemetery in Massachusetts, United States

- U.S. National Register of Historic Places
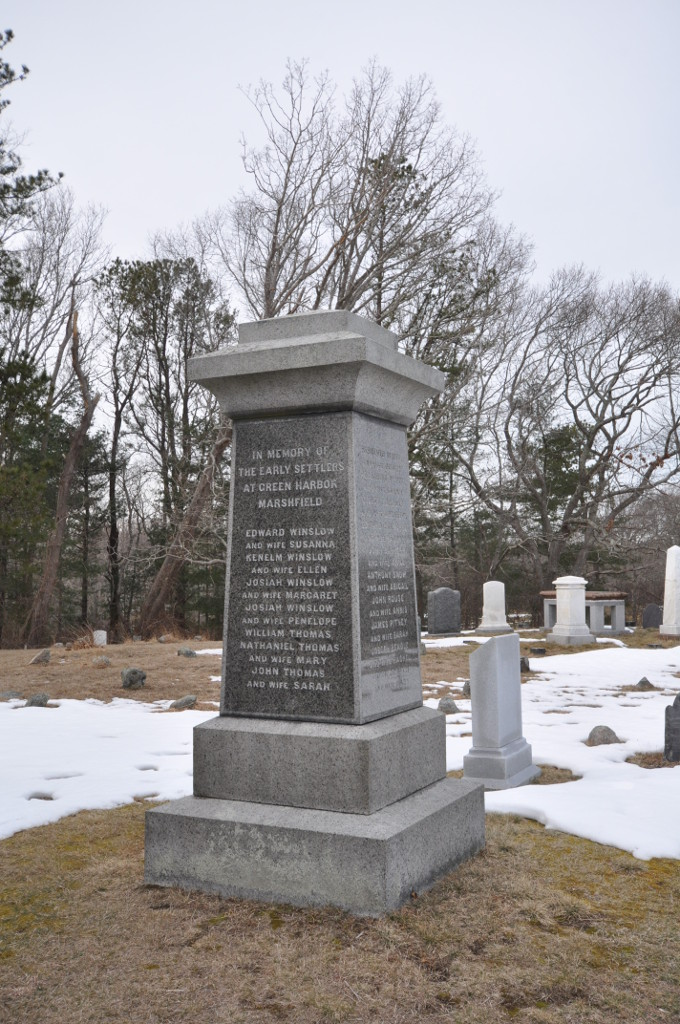
- Settlers' Memorial

- Location within Massachusetts Location within the United States
- Location: Winslow Cemetery Rd., Marshfield, Massachusetts
- Coordinates: 42°5′10″N 70°40′52″W
- Area: 3.2 acres (1.3 ha)
- Built: c. 1651
- NRHP reference No.: 100001219
- Added to NRHP: January 2, 2018

Winslow Cemetery, also known as the Old Winslow Burying Ground, is a historic cemetery on Winslow Cemetery Road in Marshfield, Massachusetts. Established about 1651, it is the oldest cemetery in Marshfield. Notable burials in the cemetery include founders and early residents of the Plymouth Colony, and 19th-century politician Daniel Webster. The cemetery, now owned and maintained by the town, was listed on the National Register of Historic Places in 2018.

== History ==
The Green Harbor area of southern Marshfield was settled in 1637 by Edward Winslow, who had arrived in the Plymouth Colony in 1630, and the town of Marshfield was incorporated in 1640. In that year a parcel of land including the cemetery site was granted to William Thomas, a Welsh immigrant who had also arrived in 1630. Thomas donated land to the town for the establishment of a burying ground, adjacent to where its first meeting house was erected. Thomas died in 1651, and his is believed to be the oldest grave in the cemetery. William Thomas's estate was acquired in 1832 by politician and lawyer Daniel Webster, who is also buried here.

There is a substantial monument to "The Settlers of Green Harbor Marshfield", naming Resolved White and his wife Judith, as well as Resolved's brother, Peregrine, and his wife Sarah. Also named on the monument is White's mother Susanna, and her second husband, Edward Winslow. Susanna's date of death is uncertain – sometime between 1654 and 1675, with burial in Winslow Cemetery. Edward Winslow died during an English military expedition in the Caribbean in 1655, and was buried at sea. A memorial to Edward Winslow also stands in the cemetery.

== Notable burials ==
- Adelaide Phillipps
- Resolved White and his wife Judith (Vassall) White
- Susanna White 2nd wife of Edward Winslow
- Peregrine White and his wife Sarah
- Daniel Webster
- Fletcher Webster
- Josiah Winslow

== See also ==
- National Register of Historic Places listings in Plymouth County, Massachusetts
