= Isaac Winslow =

American politician and military officer (1671–1738)

- Born: c. 1671; Marshfield, Plymouth Colony
- Died: 1738 (aged 66–67); Marshfield, Plymouth Colony
- Children: 6 (including John and Edward)
- Father: Josiah Winslow
- Relatives: Edward Winslow (grandfather)

Isaac Winslow (c. 1671 – December 14, 1738) was an American politician and military officer who lived in Marshfield, Massachusetts. A member of the prominent Winslow family of the Plymouth Colony, he served as a civil and military official in a period marked by political transition.

== Early life and ancestry ==
Isaac Winslow was born ca. 1671 on the family estate in the village of Marshfield, Plymouth Colony to Josiah and Penelope (Pelham) Winslow. He and his sister Elizabeth were the only children of four to survive to adulthood. Winslow's grandfather was Mayflower passenger Edward Winslow, a governor of Plymouth Colony and one of that colony's near-mythical "Pilgrims." Josiah also served as governor, as well as commander-in-chief of the colonial militia during King Philip's War.

== Career ==
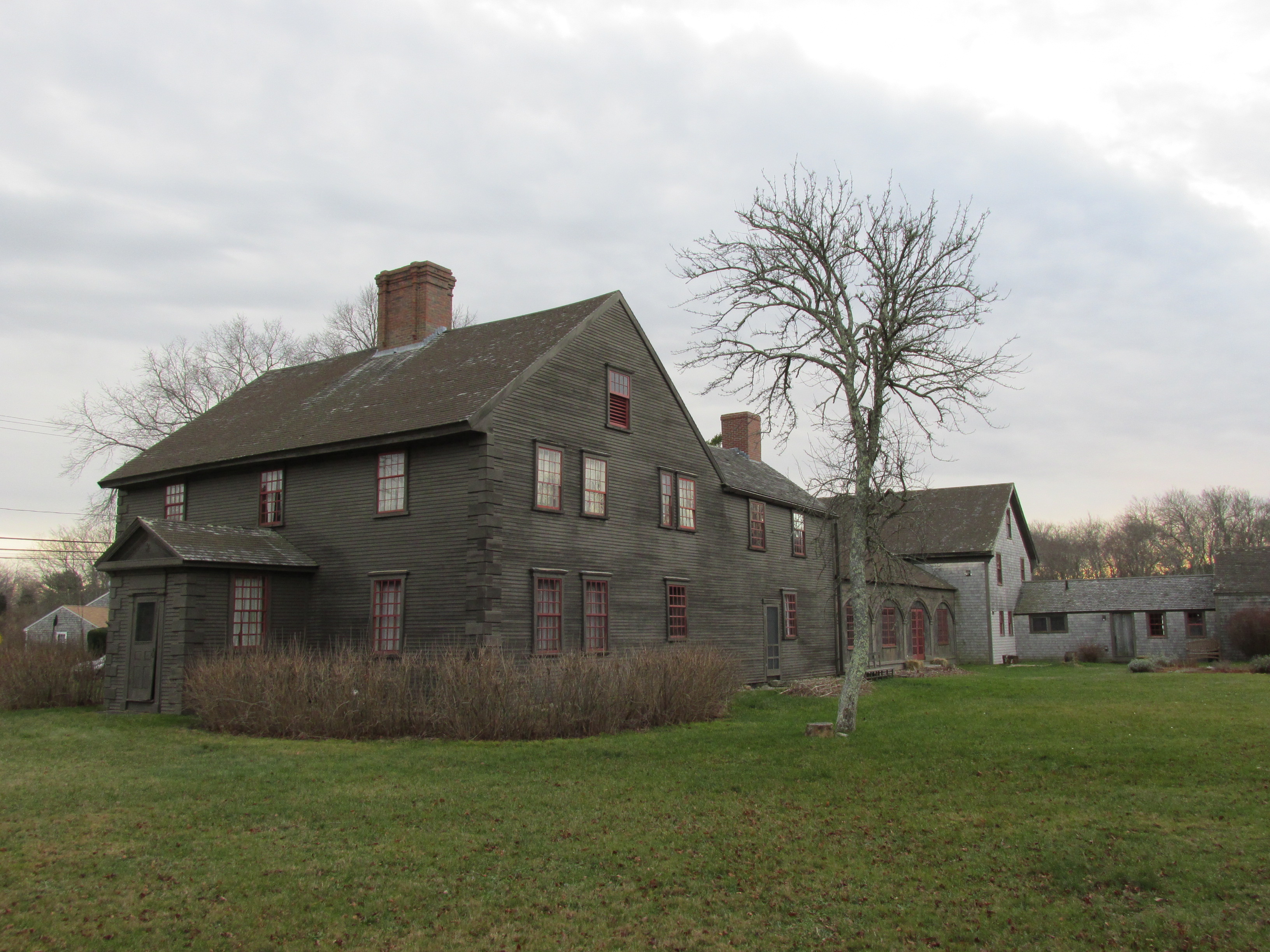
Isaac Winslow House, Marshfield Massachusetts

Winslow was appointed to the Plymouth County Inferior Court of Common Pleas in 1712 and served until 1738, for the last nine years as its chief justice. In 1715, he was commissioned a colonel in the Massachusetts militia and given charge of a regiment drawn from Plymouth County, and was a judge of the Court of Probate for Plymouth from 1718 to 1738. A decade after Plymouth's incorporation into Massachusetts, Winslow became prominent at a wider colonial level. In 1703, he was appointed for the first time to the Council for the Province of Massachusetts Bay. As a representative in the legislature's upper house, he and his fellow councilors were to serve as advisors to the Royal Governor in Boston, as well as pass laws and approve government expenditures.

Winslow's term in council was marked by a period of war and turbulent politics; Massachusetts was almost constantly fighting New England natives and French colonists in Canada, and several successive governors would clash with the lower House of Representatives on issues of finance and legislative appointments. With the exception of 1715, Winslow served as a member of the council until 1736, for a time as its president.

== Personal life ==
Around the turn of the 17th century, Winslow built a house at the current intersection of Careswell Street and Webster Street in Marshfield. The Isaac Winslow House still stands today as a museum. He married Sarah Wensley of Boston on July 11, 1700 in a ceremony presided over by the Reverend Cotton Mather. The couple had six children: Josiah (born 1701), John (born 1703), Penelope (born 1704), Elizabeth (born 1707), Anna (born 1709 or 1710), and Edward (born 1714).

Winslow died in Marshfield on December 14, 1738 and is buried in the nearby Winslow Cemetery. His wife Sarah, sons John and Edward, and daughters Penelope and Elizabeth were named heirs.
