= John Bellamy (publisher) =

John Bellamy or Iohn Bellamie (ca. 1596–1653) was an English publisher, semi-separatist and bookseller. He is noted for his connections with the Leyden Community and Mayflower passengers.

== Pilgrim Publisher of London ==
In 1611 Bellamy began his apprenticeship under Nicholas Bourne of London. In 1619/20, Bellamy's term of service terminated. John Bellamy certainly knew Edward Winslow, because Edward Winslow was an apprentice under John Beale and at his bookshop Bourne stocked the titles that Beale had printed.

In 1622, Bellamy set up his first shop called "Two Greyhounds" in Cornhill, near the Royal Exchange. Two years later, he set up a new bookshop called "Three Golden Lyons", selling and publishing books related to puritans and the New England colonies. Bellamy had published numerous works of the most distinguished puritan leaders, historians, and New England colonists. They are Henry Ainsworth, John Robinson, John Cotton, John Wemyss (Weemse), Edward Winslow, William Bradford, Thomas Hooker, Thomas Shepard, William Wood and Philip Vincent.

In 1622, he issued Mourt's Relation, one of the most important narratives relating to New England. In 1624, he published "Good Newes from New England", another important work by Edward Winslow. In the 1620s/1630s, he published Henry Ainsworth's "Annotations upon the five books of Moses".

Bellamy's contact with the New England colonists was not limited to the publication of the work of their spokesmen. He also supplied them books. When William Brewster came to Plymouth on the Mayflower ship in 1620, he brought with him many books. During the remainder of his life at Plymouth his library was augmented, and it included additional books bought from John Bellamy after 1620.

== Death ==
Bellamy died in January, 1653 in Northamptonshire, England.

== Publications ==
- 1622, A Relation or Journal of the Proceedings of the English Plantation Settled at Plymouth, by Edward Winslow and others (known for "Mourt's Relation"), sold at Iohn Bellamie's shop "Two Grey-hounds".
- 1624, Good News from New England, by Edward Winslow, sold at Iohn Bellamie's shop "Three Golden Lyons".
- 1625, An Exposition of the Second Epistle of the Apostle Paul to Timothy, the First Chapter, by John Barlow.
- 1646, Hypocrisy Unmasked, by Edward Winslow, sold at Iohn Bellamie's "Three Golden Lyons".
- 1647, New England's Salamander Discovered, by Edward Winslow, sold at Iohn Bellamie's "Three Golden Lyons".
- 1649, Glorious Progress of the Gospel Amongst the Indians, by Edward Winslow, John Eliot and Thomas Mayhew Jr. (son of Gov. Thomas Mayhew), sold at Iohn Bellamie's "Three Golden Lyons".
