= Adelaide Phillipps =

Anglo-American opera singer and actress (1833–1882)

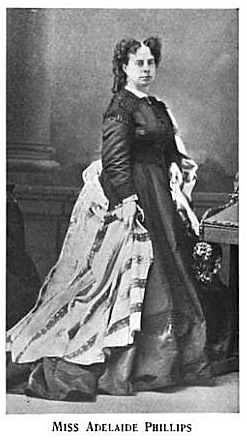
- Phillips c. 1903
- Born: Adelaide Maria Marianne Phillipps; 26 October 1833; St Paul's, Bristol, England, U.K.
- Died: 3 October 1882 (aged 48); Carlsbad, Germany
- Other name: Signorina Fillipps
- Occupations: Singer, actress

Adelaide Phillipps (26 October 1833 – 3 October 1882) was an Anglo-American opera singer and actress who became one of America's most admired contraltos of the Victorian era.

== Early life ==
She was born as Adelaide Maria Marianne Phillipps in St Paul's in Bristol in England, the second of six children and the only daughter of Alfred Phillipps (c1806–1867), a chemist and druggist, and Mary née Rees (c1811–1854), who with her sister was a dancing and calisthenics teacher in Bristol. Adelaide Phillipps was baptised at the church of St James in Bristol on 7 April 1833. Her parents placed her on the stage at an early age and she danced at various benefit performances in her native Bristol between the age of 6 and 8, including at the Theatre Royal, Bristol in May 1841 and playing the title role in Bombastes Furioso. On 7 June 1841 a Benefit for her was held during which she played four different characters in the farce Old and Young.

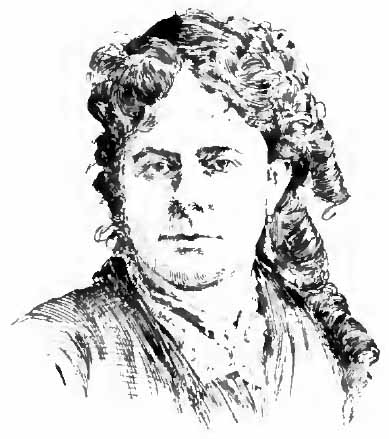
Adelaide Phillipps

She went to the United States with her family in late 1841, making her first appearance in January 1842 at the Tremont Theatre, Boston and making her New York début at Barnum's American Museum in May 1843 where she was billed as ‘the best danseuse in America’. Here she played for over a month on a bill that at one time included General Tom Thumb. In September 1843 she obtained an engagement at the Boston Museum, where she remained until 1851. When Jenny Lind appeared in Boston in 1850, Phillipps sang for her, and was advised to go to Europe.

== Musical career ==
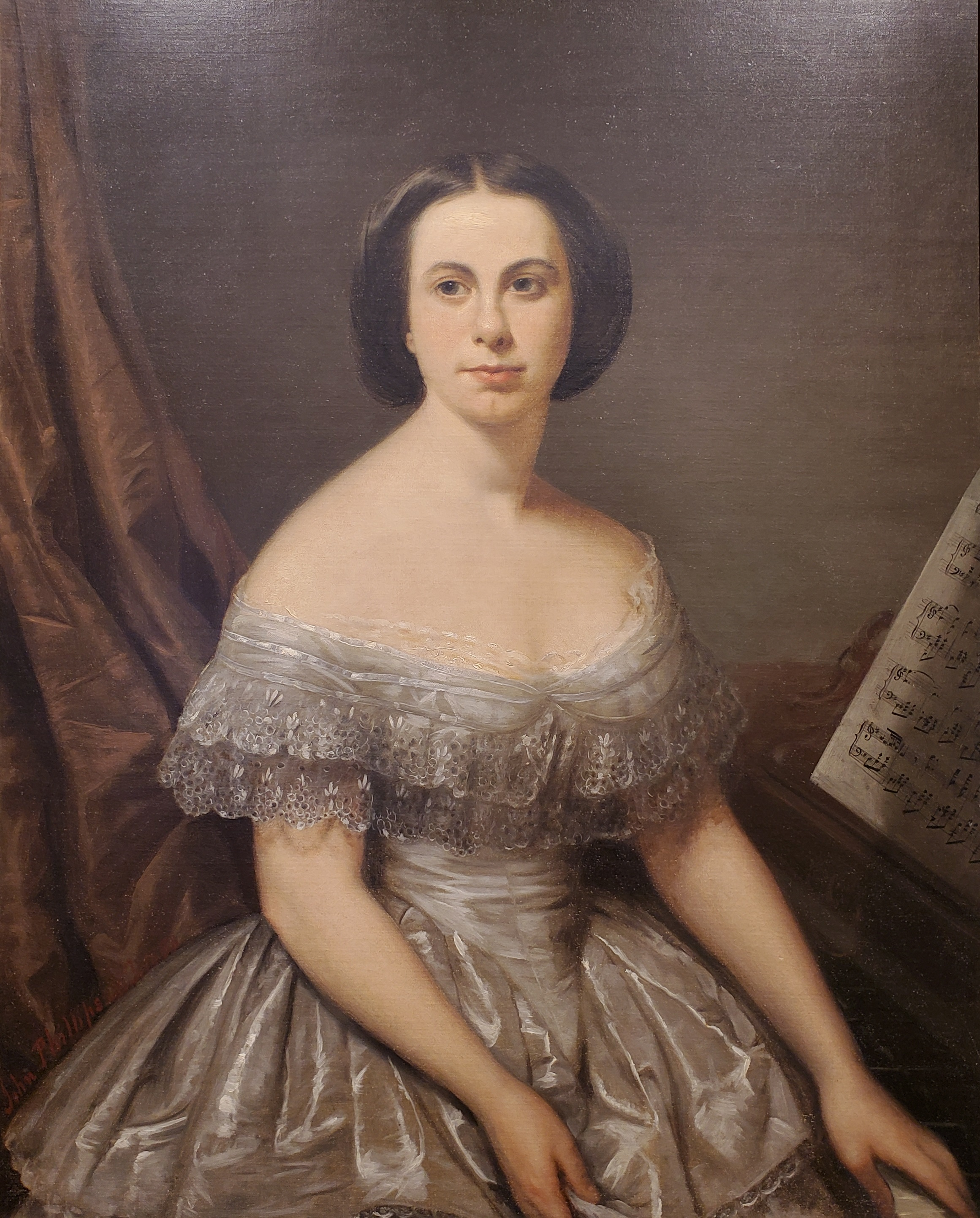
Portrait of Adelaide Phillipps.

It was largely owing to the Swedish singer's generosity and aid and that of local benefactors that Phillipps's father was enabled to take her abroad. They arrived in London in March 1852, and Phillipps became the pupil of Manuel García who re-trained her voice from that of soprano to contralto. In 1853 she went with her father, who was a well known falconer at the time, to Italy to continue her studies, and made her début the same year at Brescia, as Arsace in Semiramide. She sang also in Milan and other cities. Her stage name in Europe was Signorina Fillippi.

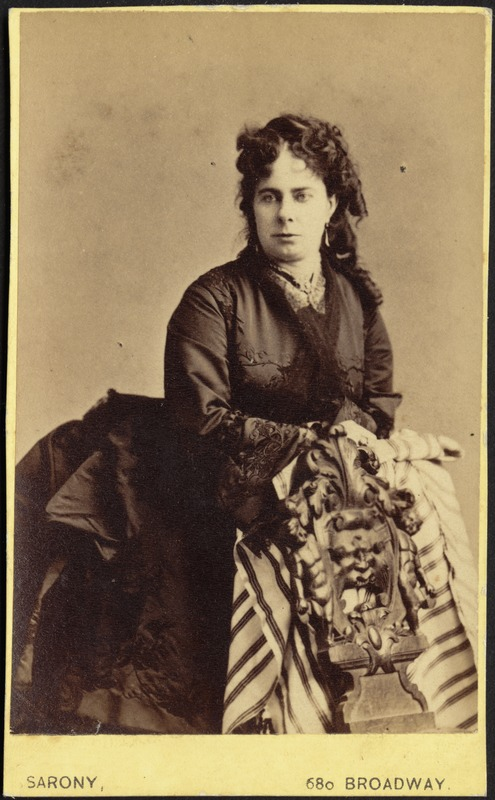
Adelaide Phillips circa 1858-1870 by Napoleon Sarony

In 1855 she returned to the United States. She made an engagement to appear in Italian opera in Philadelphia and New York City under Max Maretzek, and later went with him to Havana, Cuba. In 1860 she made her first appearance in oratorio with the Handel and Haydn Society, Boston, in the Messiah. The following year Phillipps went abroad again, and appeared in Paris as Azucena in Il Trovatore. After a professional tour in Europe she returned to the United States. In 1864 she went again to Havana, and from that time until her death she appeared in opera, oratorio, and concerts in most of the states of the Union. The Adelaide Phillipps Opera Company was organized in 1876, and on its being wound up in 1879 she joined the Ideal Opera Company, remaining with the company until 1881 and for whom she played Little Buttercup in a very successful production of Gilbert and Sullivan's H.M.S. Pinafore. She went on to play Fatinitza, Ruth in The Pirates of Penzance, Germaine in Les cloches de Corneville, the Queen in The Bohemian Girl, Lady Sangazure in The Sorcerer, and the title-role in Boccaccio. She made her last appearance on the stage in Cincinnati, Ohio in 1882.

Failing health compelled her to rest, and she went to Europe in the hope of recovery, but died suddenly at Carlsbad, Germany in October 1882. Her body was brought back to the United States on the steamship Werra. She was buried at the Winslow Cemetery in Marshfield, Massachusetts beside her brother, Frederick, who had died in 1879. Phillipps' voice was a contralto, with a compass of two and one half octaves. The characters in which she excelled were Rosina, Leonora, and Azucena.
