= Peregrine White =

Baby born on the Mayflower

Captain Peregrine White
- Born: c. November 20, 1620; Mayflower (docked in Provincetown Harbor)
- Died: July 20, 1704 (aged 83); Marshfield, Province of Massachusetts Bay
- Burial place: Winslow Cemetery
- Other name: Peregrin
- Known for: First baby born in Plymouth Colony
- Spouse: Sarah Bassett
- Children: Daniel White, Sylvanus White
- Parents: William White (father); Susanna White (mother)
- Relatives: Resolved White (brother)

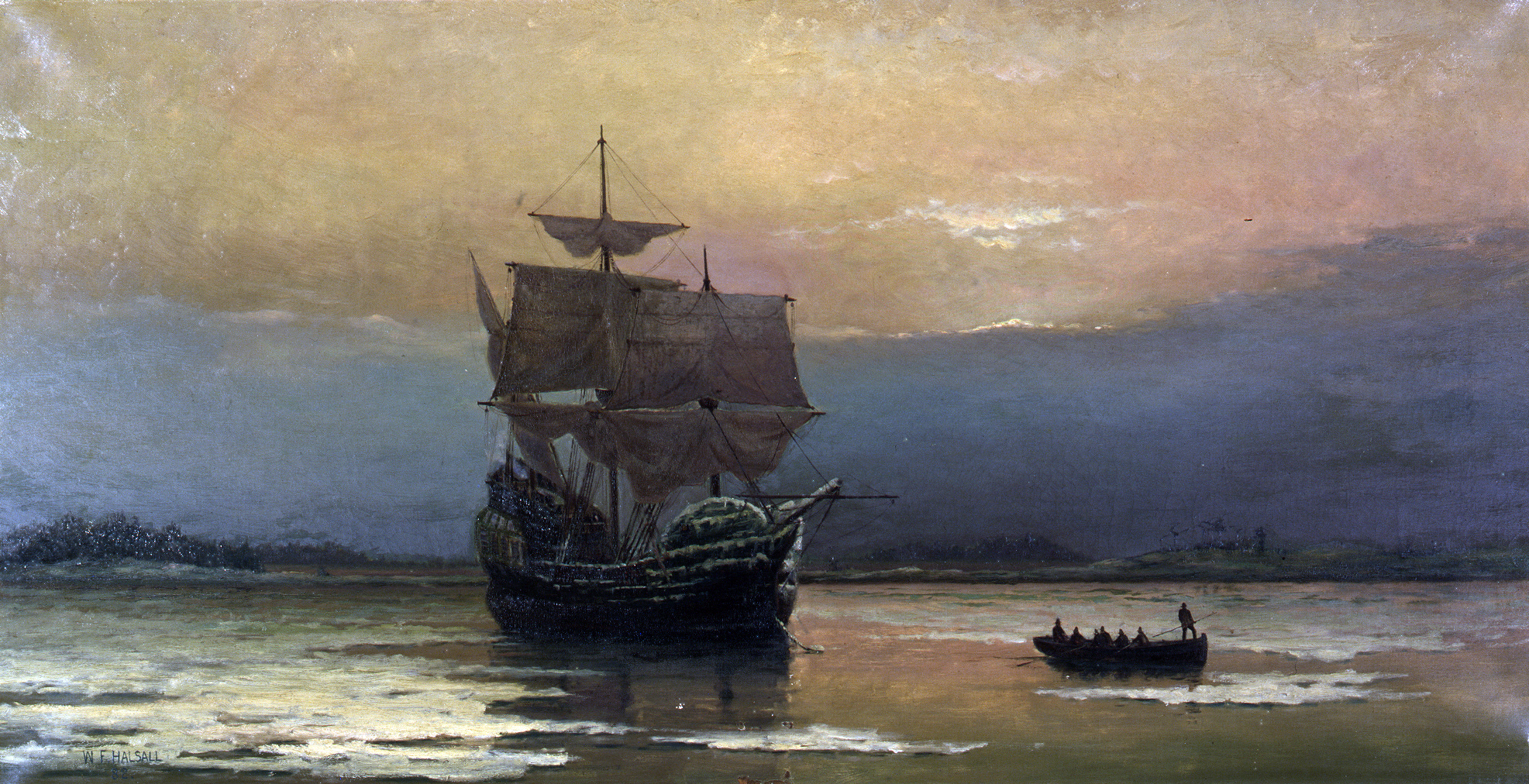
William Halsall, Mayflower in Plymouth Harbor (1882)

Peregrine White (b. 1620 – d. 1704) was the first boy born on the Pilgrim ship the Mayflower in the harbour of Massachusetts, the second baby born on the Mayflower's historic voyage, and the first known English child born to the Pilgrims in America. His parents, William White and his pregnant wife Susanna, with their son Resolved White and two servants, came on the Mayflower in 1620. Peregrine White was born while the Mayflower lay at anchor in the harbor at Cape Cod. In later life, he became a person of note in Plymouth Colony, active in both military and government affairs.

== English origins ==
Peregrine White was the second son of Mayflower pilgrim William White and his wife Susanna White Winslow. His mother Susanna was pregnant during the Mayflower voyage and gave birth to Peregrine in late November 1620 while the ship was anchored at Cape Cod, now Provincetown Harbor.

The Whites are believed to have boarded the Mayflower as part of the London merchant group, and not as members of the Leiden Holland religious movement. Evidence of the William White family coming to the Mayflower from England and not Holland comes from William Bradford's Mayflower passenger list which has "Mr. William White" in his section for London merchants along with Christopher Martin, William Mullins, Stephen Hopkins, Richard Warren and John Billington. It is believed that if William White had been a member of the Leiden congregation, his name would have appeared in Bradford's work for that section, but it does not. There is no evidence to associate William White and his family with Leiden, Holland. And regarding the various White family ancestries which erroneously place the William White family in them, the Mayflower Society states that "Little is known about William White."

== Mayflower voyage ==
The White family, as recalled by William Bradford in 1651 consisted of, "Mr. William White, and Susana, his wife, and one son, called Resolved, and one borne a ship-bord, called Peregrine; and 2 servants, named William Holbeck and Edward Thomson."

The Mayflower departed from Plymouth, England, on the 6/16 of September in 1620. The small, 100-foot ship had 102 passengers and a crew of about 30-40 in extremely cramped conditions. By the second month out the ship was being buffeted by strong westerly gales, causing the ship's timbers to be badly shaken with caulking failing to keep out sea water and with passengers, even in their berths, lying wet and ill. This, combined with a lack of proper rations and unsanitary conditions for several months, contributed to circumstances that would be fatal for many, especially the majority of women and children. On the way there were two deaths, a crew member and a passenger, but the worst was yet to come after arriving at their destination when, in the space of several months, almost half the passengers perished in the cold, harsh, unfamiliar New England winter.

At some point along the journey, the first baby was born on the Mayflower, Oceanus Hopkins, to the passengers Stephen and Elizabeth Hopkins.

On 9/19 November 1620, after about 3 months at sea including a month of delays in England, they spotted land which was the Cape Cod Hook, now called Provincetown Harbor. After several days of trying to sail south to their planned destination of the Colony of Virginia, strong winter seas forced them to return to the harbor at Cape Cod hook, where they anchored on 11/21 November 1620. The Mayflower Compact was signed that day.

== In Plymouth Colony ==
Peregrine White's father William White died on 21 February 1621. With her husband's death, Susanna, with her newborn son Peregrine and five-year-old Resolved, became the only surviving widow out of the many families who perished that first winter. On 12 May 1621 Peregrine's mother Susanna married widower Edward Winslow, a Mayflower and later a Plymouth colony notable with whom she had five children, one of whom was Josiah Winslow, future Plymouth governor.

In the 1627 Division of Cattle, both Resolved [sic] and his brother Peregrine were listed in the Third Lot under Capt. Standish in the family of Edward Winslow, his wife Susanna and their sons Edward and John Winslow.

In 1636, the family, now numbering 6 - Edward and Susanna, Resolved and Peregrine White, and the two children born to Edward and Susanna, Josias and Elizabeth Winslow - moved to the new settlement of Marshfield, north of Plymouth.

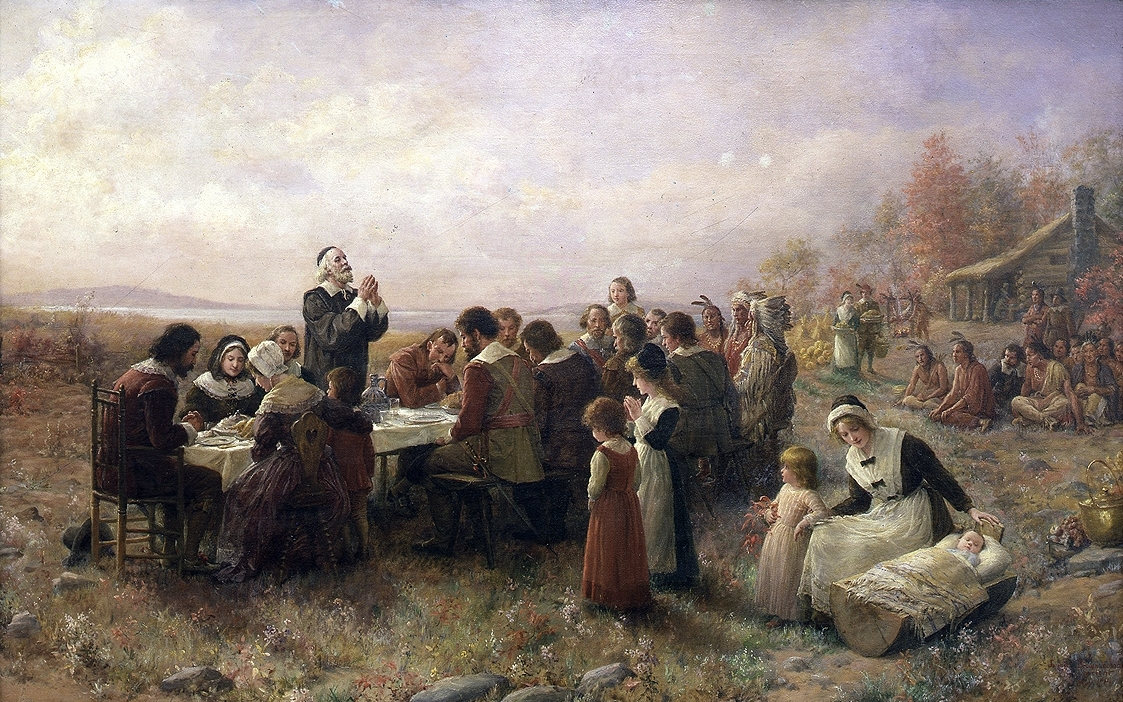
The First Thanksgiving at Plymouth (1914) By Jennie A. Brownscombe

Peregrine served in the militia at age 16 and continued to serve, first as a lieutenant and then a captain. He was also a farmer. At some point he also served his community as a representative to the General Court.

On 23 October 1643, at Marshfield, Peregrine White sold to Mannasses Kempton of Plymouth, land at Eel River that had been given to him the year before by his stepfather Edward Winslow.

At the court on 6 March 1648/9, Peregrine White and Sarah his wife, both of Marshfield, were presented (fined) for fornication before marriage. Since records show their first child, Daniel, was born in 1649, they seemed to have married after Sarah had become pregnant.

Peregrine's in-laws, the Bassets, had a great deal of land in Marshfield and Peregrine and Sarah moved there, eventually buying several adjacent pieces of property as the years progressed.

On 3 June 1651, Lt. Peregrine White was admitted as a Freeman.

On 3 June 1652, William Bassett Sr. of Duxburrow gave his son-in-law Lt. Peregrine White 40 acres of upland.

In 1655, he was granted land as the "first of the English that was borne in these partes."

On 16 June 1656, as written, William Bassett Sr. of Duxborrow [sic], now living at Bridgewater, gave his lands in Scituate to his sons Peregrine White and Nathaniel Bassett.

On 2 October 1658, he was chosen as a member of the council of war.

On 3 June 1662, Peregrine was chosen to be deputy for Marshfield.

On 4 March 1673/4, Lt. Peregrine White was granted 100 acres at Titicut.

On 19 August 1674, Peregrine White of Marshfield deeded to his son, Daniel White, in consideration of his intended marriage, various buildings and lands in Marshfield from the time of his death, except if he died before his wife Sarah and Daniel was to pay monies to sister Sarah and Mercy when they became or married.

On 22 May 1696, Capt. Peregrine White "the first born Child of New England born November 1620" was admitted into the Marshfield Church in his 78th year. At age 78, Peregrine officially joined the Marshfield church.

== Family ==
Peregrine White married before 6 March 1648/9 Sarah Bassett, daughter of William and Elizabeth/Elisabeth Bassett. William Bassett came to Plymouth in 1621 on the Fortune as a single man, but by the 1623 division was allotted two acres showing he had married before that date. Bassett's name as "Wm Bassett, Sen" appears on the 1643 Able to Bear Arms list for Duxborrow [sic]. William Bassett became a Plymouth Colony person of historic note.

Sarah Bassett was born in Plymouth c.1630 and died in Marshfield on 22 January 1711. They had seven children between c.1649 and c.1670:

- Daniel White, born c.1649 and died in Marshfield on 6 May 1724, noted in records as being either 70 or 75. In Marshfield, on 19 August 1674, he married Hannah Hunt, who was last known to be living on 15 May 1721. They had seven children.
- (child) White, born c.1650/1.
- Jonathan White, born in Marshfield on 4 June 1658. He died in Yarmouth between 14 July 1736 and 22 February 1737. Whites Brook in Yarmouth, Massachusetts, is named after him since he lived nearby.

Jonathan White married twice:

Hester Nickerson, daughter of Nicholas and Mary Nickerson; she married Jonathan in Yarmouth on 2 February 1682/3. She was born in Yarmouth in the last week of October 1656 and died there on 8 February 1702/3. They had seven children.
Margaret Elizabeth Alexander***, married in 1708. She died in Yarmouth on 12 April 1718. ***Please note this information is based on the publication of Roscoe Ross White called White family records: descendants of Peregrine White, son of William and Susanna (Fuller) White, 1620 to 1939. He claims, in part, that the listing in Massachusetts, Town Clerk, Vital and Town Records, 1626-2001 recording the death of Elizabeth White 2nd wife of Jonathan White in Yarmouth on 12 April 1718 is that of Margaret Elizabeth Alexander. While Jonathan White was recorded to have a second wife named Elizabeth, her maiden name was never given, she is just listed as Elizabeth WHITE wife of Jonathan. Roscoe submitted this work to the Mayflower Society, they thoroughly researched it and rejected these claims based on lack of supporting evidence.

In 1704 - The will of Peregrine White (which is owned by and displayed at Pilgrim Hall in Plymouth), dated July 14, 1704, and proved August 14 of the same year states: Peregrine White of Marshfield…..Being aged and under many Weaknesses and Bodily Infirmities devised to his wife Sarah everything not otherwise disposed of by the will to his eldest son Daniel …personal items and land .. as well as various personal items and land to daughters Sarah and Mercy and sons Jonathan and Peregrine. His will was signed with the initials PW "The mark of Peregrine White" who was then aged almost 84 years.

== Death and burial ==
Peregrine White died on July 20, 1704 (Old Style), in Marshfield, Massachusetts at age 83 years and 8 months. He was buried in Winslow Cemetery in Marshfield, Massachusetts. He was the last surviving Pilgrim Father, though the last Mayflower passenger, Mary Allerton, died in 1699. His wife Sarah died on January 22, 1711, and was also buried in Winslow Cemetery. Additionally, Peregrine's elder brother Resolved White, his wife Judith and their mother Susanna were all buried in Winslow Cemetery. Winslow Cemetery has a substantial stone monument to "The Early Settlers of Green Harbor Marshfield" naming, among others, Resolved and Peregrine White, their wives and mother Susanna as well as her second husband Edward Winslow.

== Obituary ==
Marshfield vital records note the death of "Capt. Peregrine White" on "July ye 20:1704" and the 'Boston Newsletter' of Monday July 31, 1704, gives the following obituary: "Marshfield, July, 22 Capt. Peregrine White of this town, Aged Eighty three years, and Eight Months; died the 20th Instant. He was vigorous and of a comly Aspect to the last; Was the Son of Mr. William White and Susanna his Wife;' born on board the Mayflower, Capt. Jones Commander, in Cape Cod Harbour. Altho' he was in the former part of his Life extravagant; yet was much Reform'd in his last years; and died hopefully."
