= William White (Mayflower passenger) =

Passenger on the Mayflower ship

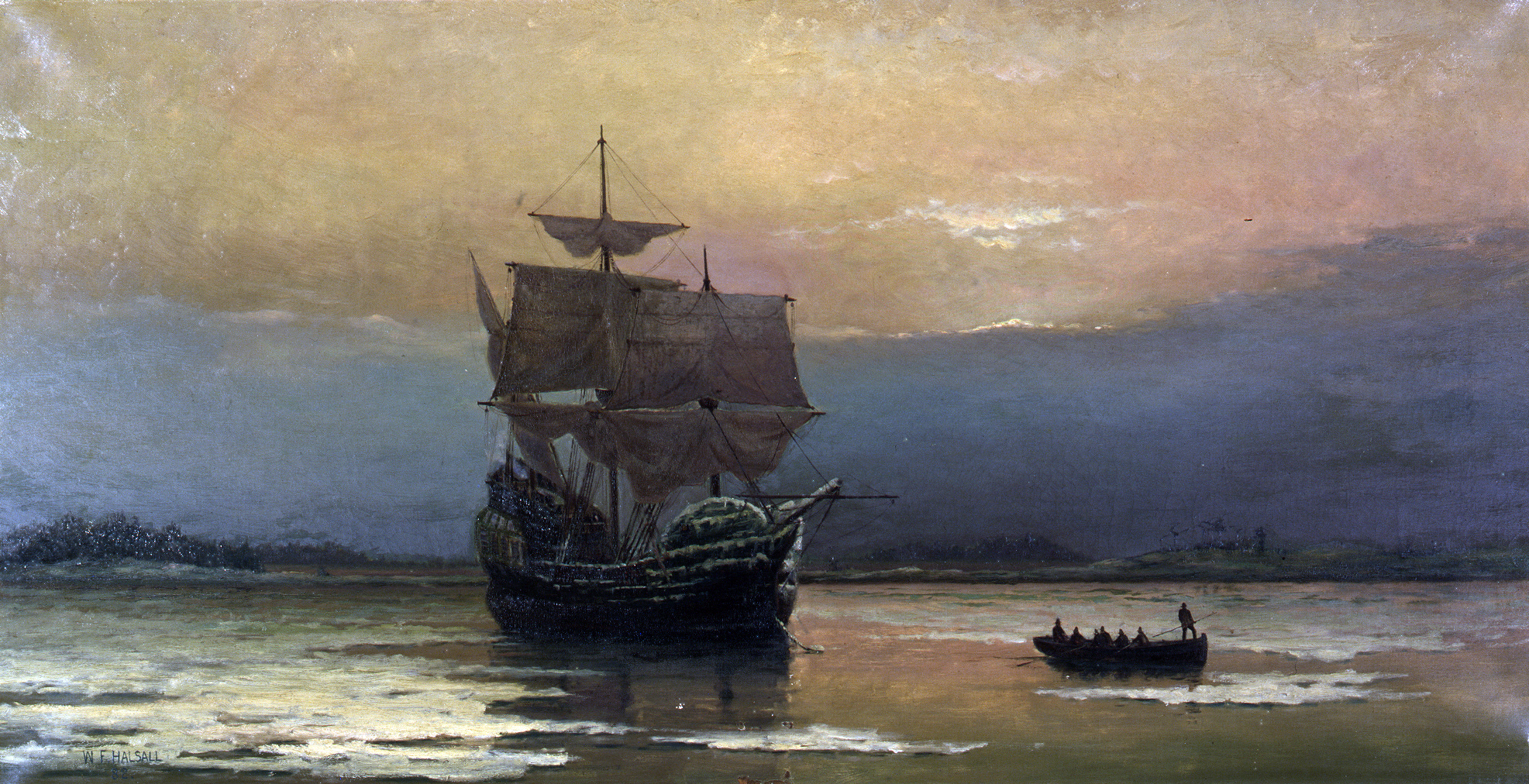
Mayflower in Plymouth Harbor by William Halsall (1882)

William White (25 January 1586/7 – 21 February 1621) was a passenger on the Mayflower. Accompanied by his wife Susanna, son Resolved and two servants, and joined by a son, Peregrine, on the way, he traveled in 1620 on the historic voyage. He was a signatory to the Mayflower Compact and perished early in the history of Plymouth Colony.

== English origin ==
William White of the Mayflower was baptized 25 January 1586/7 at Wisbech, Isle of Ely, Cambridgeshire, England, son of Edward and Thomasine (Cross)(May) White.

The commonness of William White's name had made genealogical research on him difficult. According to genealogist Charles Edward Banks, his surname is one of the dozen most common in England and his baptismal name one of the four most frequently bestowed in that period. As a result, "Little is known about Pilgrim William White."

Further, there is confusion about William White in Leiden. Records reveal that there were two men of that name living there, other than Mayflower William White about 1620 and both appear to have been still there after the Mayflower departed. Aside from the William Whites in Leiden confusion, an additional contributing factor was the name of the wife of one of the William Whites – Ann – which erroneously has connected the Whites with the Fuller family.

Other evidence of the William White family coming to the Mayflower from England and not Holland comes from William Bradford's passenger list which has "Mr. William White" in his section for London merchants along with Mr. Christopher Martin, Mr. William Mullins, Mr. Stephen Hopkins, Mr. Richard Warren, and John Billington. It is believed that if William White had been a member of the Leiden congregation, his name would have appeared in Bradford's work for that section, but it does not. There is no evidence to associate the William White of the Mayflower with Leiden, Holland.

== The Mayflower voyage ==
William White came on board the Mayflower with his pregnant wife Susanna, son Resolved, then about five years in age and two servants. Susanna gave birth to their son Peregrine on board the Mayflower several weeks after White signed the Mayflower Compact.

The White family, as recalled by William Bradford in 1651, per their Mayflower voyage, and the birth of Peregrine: "Mr. William White, and Susana, his wife, and one son, called Resolved, and one borne a ship-bord, called Peregrine; and *2* servants, named William Holbeck and Edward Thomson."

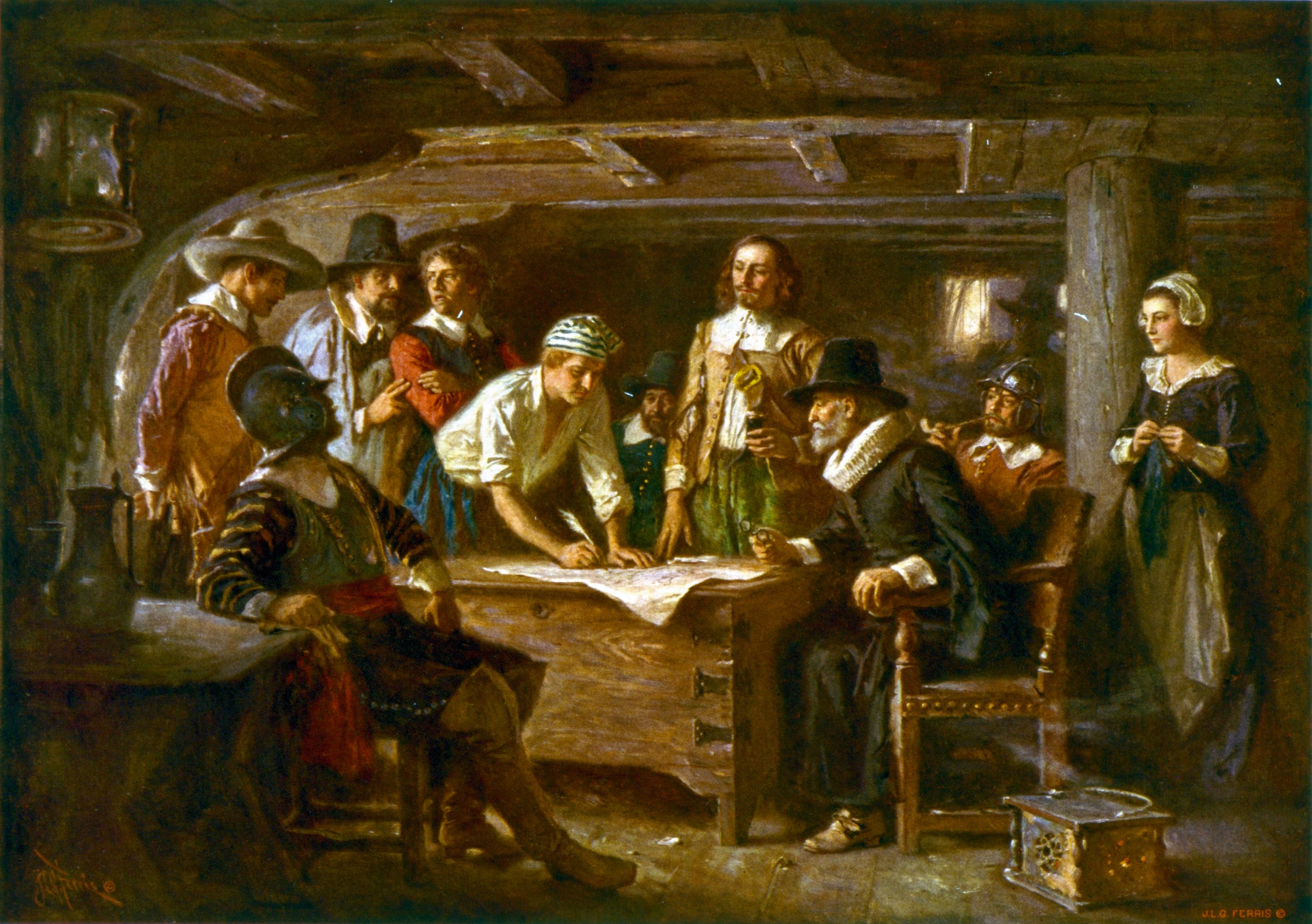
Signing the Mayflower Compact 1620, a painting by Jean Leon Gerome Ferris 1899

The Mayflower departed from Plymouth in England on 6/16 September 1620. The small, 100-foot ship had 102 passengers and a crew of about 30-40 in extremely cramped conditions. By the second month out, the ship was being buffeted by strong westerly gales, causing the ship's timbers to be badly shaken with caulking failing to keep out sea water, and with passengers, even in their berths, lying wet and ill. This, combined with a lack of proper rations and unsanitary conditions for several months, attributed to what would be fatal for many, especially the majority of women and children. On the way there were two deaths, a crew member and a passenger, but the worst was yet to come after arriving at their destination when, in the space of several months, almost half the passengers perished in cold, harsh, unfamiliar New England winter.

On 9/19 November 1620, after about 3 months at sea including a month of delays in England, they spotted land which was the Cape Cod Hook, now called Provincetown Harbor. After several days of trying to get south to their planned destination of the Colony of Virginia, strong winter seas forced them to return to the harbor at Cape Cod hook, where they anchored on 11/21 November. The Mayflower Compact was signed that day.

William White was the eleventh signatory to the Mayflower Compact. His servants William Holbeck and Edward Thompson were not of age and could not sign the Compact.

== In Plymouth Colony ==
William White died late in the first winter, on 21 February in 1621. With the death of her husband Susanna White, with newborn Peregrine and five-year-old Resolved, became the only surviving widow out of the many families who perished that winter. By the Spring of 1621, 52 of the 102 persons who originally had arrived on the Mayflower at Cape Cod would be dead.

In May 1621, Susanna White became the first Plymouth colony bride, marrying Edward Winslow, a fellow Mayflower passenger whose wife had perished on 24 March 1621. At least five children were born to Edward Winslow and his wife Susanna.

And though deceased, in the 1623 Division of Land, White received five acres (akers) "lyeth behind the forte to the little ponde." (lying behind the fort to the little pond). Edward Winslow, his wife Susanna's husband since 12 May 1621, received four acres in the same section. White's sons Resolved and Peregrine were both listed with their step-father Edward Winslow and mother Susanna in the 1627 Division of Cattle, and moved with their parents to Marshfield in 1632.

About 1638, the Winslows moved with Susanna's sons Resolved and Peregrine White, to Green Harbor, now called Marshfield, Massachusetts. Edward Winslow later became Governor of Plymouth County, and was also the colony agent in England. In England, his diplomatic skills soon came to the attention of Oliver Cromwell, the new Puritan leader of the country. Cromwell required Winslow head a joint award reparations commission to assess damage caused by Danish ships.

Edward Winslow lived in England the last six years of his life, serving the government there. When his will was written in 1654 as resident of London, the document stated that he left his New England property to his son Josiah "hee (sic) allowing to my wife a full third parte thereof for her life also" so it is probable that his wife did not follow him to London. Edward Winslow died of fever on 7/8 May 1655 while on a British military expedition in the Caribbean.

There is no trace of Susanna's death beyond a sales record in 1647, and no further record of Susanna has been found. Though she was the wife of one colony governor and the mother of another, the first bride in the colony and the mother of the famed Peregrine White, she seems forgotten in the records.

The Mayflower Society has refuted the reported maiden surname of 'Fuller' for Susanna White and has determined that the maiden name of Susanna White is unknown. Further, Susanna ____ (White) Winslow, was not the sister of Dr. Samuel Fuller as is often stated. The Samuel and Edward Fuller who traveled on the Mayflower were sons of Robert Fuller of Redenhall, England. Robert had a daughter Anna, born about 1578, far too old a bride for Winslow who was not born until 1595. The 1615 will of Robert Fuller mentions no daughter named Susanna, nor a daughter married to William White. It does mention Alice Bradford, a sister-in-law. In a letter that Edward Winslow wrote in 1623 to "Uncle Robert Jackson", he provided news of Susanna, her late husband William White, and her children. He also sends his regards to his father-in-law in England, obviously not Robert Fuller who had been dead for nine years.

Another misrepresentation is that William White once lived in Holland. For many years genealogists assumed that William White spent his early married years in Holland, marrying and burying children, but no proof that they apply to the Pilgrim William White, but rather they probably apply to the William White who was still living there in 1621.

== Family of William White and Susanna Jackson ==
William White married Susanna Jackson ca 1614 (a marriage to Anna Fuller was disproven years ago) and had two sons. White died on 21 February 1621. Susanna remarried on 12 May 1621 to Edward Winslow and had five children with him. The date of Susanna's death is uncertain — sometime between 18 December 1654 (Edward Winslow's will) and 2 July 1675 (Josiah Winslow's will where she is not mentioned). She was buried in Winslow Cemetery in Marshfield where her sons Resolved and Peregrine White and their wives were buried. Edward Winslow died on a British military expedition in the Caribbean in 1655 and was buried at sea.

Children of William White and his wife Susanna:

- Resolved White was born about 1615 in England; he died sometime after 19 September 1687. He is buried with his first wife Judith Vassall in Winslow Cemetery, Marshfield, Massachusetts. Resolved White married twice. On 5 November 1640, he married Judith Vassall, daughter of William Vassall, in Scituate, Massachusetts. She was born in England about 1619 and was buried in Marshfield on 3 April 1670. The couple had eight children born in Scituate between 1642 and 1656. On 5 October 1674, he married Abigail, widow of William Lord, in Salem. She was born in England c. 1606 and died in Salem between 15 and 27 June 1682.
- Peregrine White was born aboard the ship Mayflower late in November 1620 and died in Marshfield on 20 July 1704. He married Sarah Bassett, daughter of William Bassett, by 6 March 1648/9 and had seven children. She died in Marshfield on 22 January 1711.

In 1651, William Bradford recalled William White, writing that "Mr. White dyed soon after ther landing. His wife married with Mr. Winslow (as is before noted). His *2* sons are married, and Resolved had *5* children, Peregrine tow [sic], all living. So their increase are now *7*."

== Death of William White ==
William White died on 21 February 1621. He was buried in Cole's Hill Burial Ground in Plymouth, likely in an unmarked grave as with most from the Mayflower who died that first winter. His name appears on the Pilgrim Memorial Tomb (sarcophagus) on Cole's Hill. The date of death of his wife Susanna, who became the second wife of Edward Winslow, is uncertain. She was buried in the Winslow Cemetery, Marshfield, as were her sons Resolved and Peregrine and their families. Edward Winslow died on a British military expedition in the Caribbean in 1655 and was buried at sea.

== Servants traveling with White family ==
William Holbeck. He boarded the Mayflower as an indentured servant. He did not sign the Mayflower Compact so it may be presumed he was under the age of 21, possibly in his teens. His surname was not especially a common one. It may be assumed that he came from the same region of England as the White family, but the origins of this family have not been located.

William Holbeck died during the first winter at Plymouth. William Bradford reporting that "Mr. White and his two servants died soon after landing."

Edward Thomson (or Thompson). He boarded the Mayflower as a servant to William White. He did not sign the Mayflower Compact which indicates he was not yet 21 years of age, and was probably in his teens. His English origins are not known and due to his very common name, difficult to research. He may have come from the same area of England as the White family, whose origins are known. Edward Thompson was the first Mayflower passenger to die, as reported by William Bradford, after the ship's arrival at Cape Cod, probably on 4 December 1620. This was several weeks before the Pilgrims located and decided to settle at Plymouth. Several memorials to him and others from the Mayflower who were the earliest to die exist today at Provincetown on Cape Cod.
