= Isaac Winslow House =

Historic house in Massachusetts, United States

- U.S. National Register of Historic Places
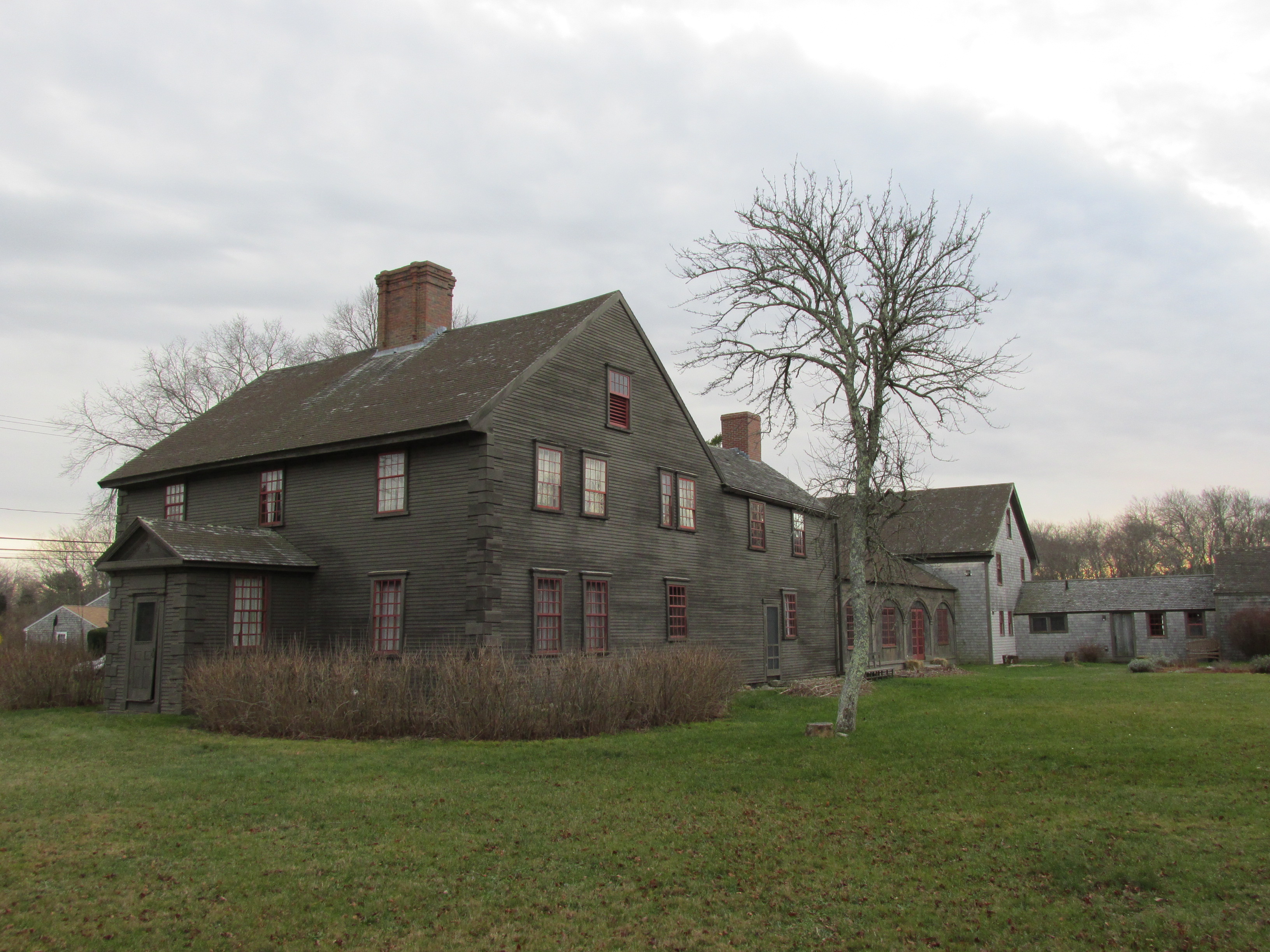
- Isaac Winslow House

- Location within Massachusetts Location within the United States
- Location: 634 Careswell St., Marshfield, Massachusetts
- Coordinates: 42.07133°N 70.67307°W
- Built: c. 1700
- Architectural style: Georgian
- NRHP reference No.: 00000872
- Added to NRHP: August 15, 2000

The Isaac Winslow House, also known as the Winslow House Museum, is a mansion located in Marshfield, Massachusetts built around 1700. The house is listed on the National Register of Historic Places.

== History of the Isaac Winslow House ==
The Isaac Winslow House is the ancestral home of the founding family of Marshfield and was considered an avant-garde South Shore mansion. The Isaac Winslow House was built circa 1699. This was the third house built on land granted to Governor Edward Winslow (1595–1655) in the 1630s who erected the first homestead.

Built by Judge Isaac Winslow, the house is virtually untouched by modernization. It has been occupied by a family of governors, generals, doctors, lawyers and judges who helped to create Marshfield and the South Shore. It survives as an example of how well-to-do landed gentry, particularly Loyalists, lived in the years prior to the American Revolutionary War.

Among its occupants were General John Winslow, leader of the Massachusetts militia, who is best known for his role in the expulsion of the Acadians from Nova Scotia—an event commemorated by Longfellow in his epic poem Evangeline. His son, Isaac Winslow, was a Loyalist doctor who quarantined and inoculated many Marshfield and Duxbury residents afflicted with smallpox. Largely because of his actions, his property was not confiscated after the Revolution. Another notable occupant was the manservant Briton Hammon, who after voyaging at sea, being captured by Indians off the coast of Florida, and his subsequent escape and reconciliation with former master John Winslow, wrote his life story, becoming among the first African-Americans to have published his work in the New World.

The house remained in the Winslow family until 1822, and was later owned by Daniel Webster. It was restored and opened to the public in 1920. The house was added to the National Register of Historic Places in 2000.

== Museum ==
A tour of the home shows antiques and architecture from the Winslow period, and includes items such as a Queen Anne dresser constructed around 1760.

Also on the grounds is a carriage shed housing Webster's one-horse phaeton, as well as Marshfield's own Concord stagecoach once used to transport passengers from Marshfield to Hingham, and a brougham formerly owned by a railroad magnate. A working blacksmith shop is on site and has been a favorite spot for many Marshfield school children on field trips to the house. Across the street is the 1857 Winslow Schoolhouse, and it shows how a school day would have been conducted prior to the American Civil War. The Tea Room, built in 1920 to serve turkey dinners used to raise money for the Winslow House restoration, is still in use for functions, lectures, field trips and dinners and can be rented out by private parties.

Since 1920, the Winslow House has been the property of the Winslow House Association, a non-profit group created specifically to promote and sustain the long-term well-being of the home. It is open to the public for tours from Memorial Day to Columbus Day, and maintains a full schedule of dinners, lectures, concerts and other community events.

== See also ==
- National Register of Historic Places listings in Plymouth County, Massachusetts
