= Susanna White (Mayflower passenger) =

Founding member of Plymouth Colony

- Known for: passenger on the Mayflower
- Spouse(s): William White; Edward Winslow

Susanna (Jackson) White Winslow (c. 1592 – after 1654) was a passenger on the Mayflower and the wife of fellow Mayflower passengers William White and Edward Winslow, successively.

Born Susanna Jackson, the daughter of Richard and Mary (Pettinger) Jackson, she went to Amsterdam and joined its separatist congregation about 1608, where she married future Mayflower passenger William White. She was the mother of one son, Resolved, when she boarded the Mayflower and was pregnant during its voyage, giving birth to Peregrine in late November 1620 while the ship was anchored at Cape Cod. Peregrine was the second baby born on the Mayflower's voyage, and the first-known English child born to the Pilgrims in America. Susanna was one of the four adult Pilgrim women who survived their first winter in the New World, along with Eleanor Billington, Elizabeth Hopkins, and Mary Brewster; these four, with young daughters and male and female servants, cooked the first Thanksgiving feast.

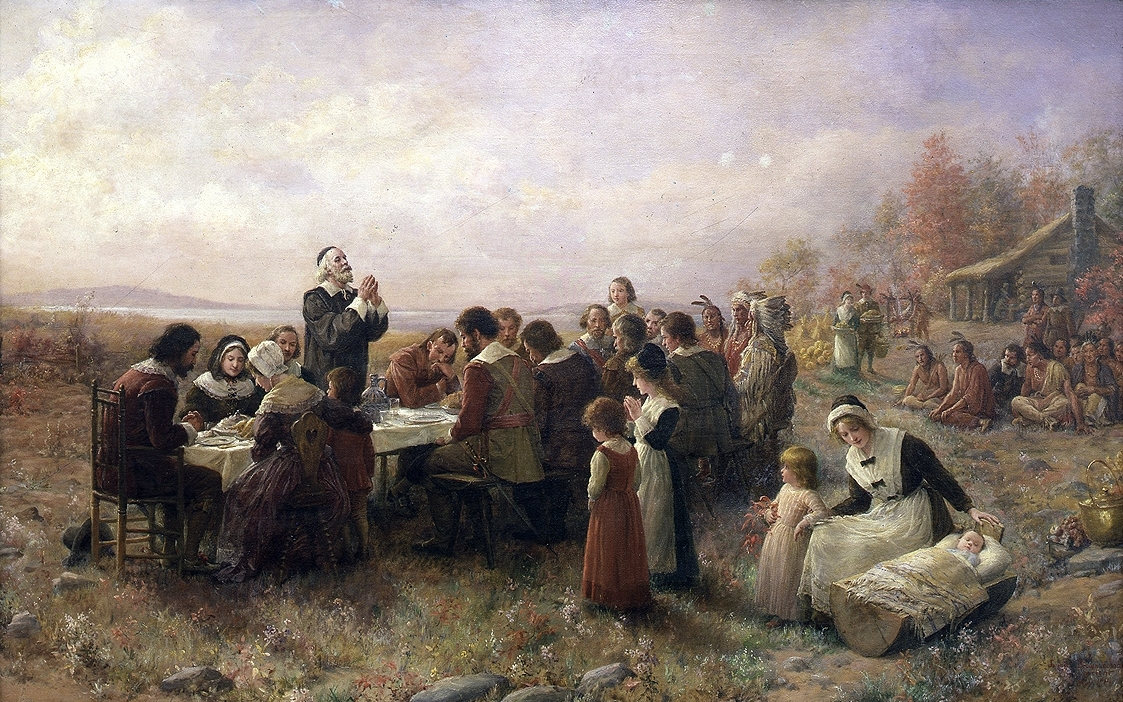
Jennie Augusta Brownscombe, The First Thanksgiving at Plymouth, 1914, Pilgrim Hall Museum, Plymouth, Massachusetts

Susanna was widowed February 21, 1621, and months later remarried to Pilgrim Edward Winslow on May 12, 1621, in Plymouth Colony. Edward's prior wife had died on March 24, 1621. The wedding of Edward Winslow and Susanna was the first in Plymouth Colony.

The following were children of Susanna's first marriage with William White and who became Edward Winslow's step-sons:

- Resolved White – born c. 1615. Married 1640 (1) Judith Vassall, daughter of William Vassall, and had eight children. Resolved married 1674 (2) to widow Abigail Lord. She died 1682. He died in 1687.
- Peregrine White – born late November 1620 on board the Mayflower in Cape Cod Harbor. Married c. 1648/9 Sarah Bassett daughter of William Bassett, and had seven children. She died 1711. He died at Marshfield, Massachusetts, on July 20, 1704.

Children of Susanna and Edward Winslow include:

- (child) born and died in 1622 or 1623
- Edward Winslow – born c. 1624. No record after May 22, 1627.
- John Winslow – born c. 1626. No record after May 22, 1627.
- Josiah Winslow, 13th Governor of Plymouth Colony – born c. 1627. Married Penelope Pelham by 1658 and had four children. He died in 1680. She died in 1703.
- Elizabeth Winslow – born c. 1631. Married (1) Robert Brooks on 8 April 1656 in Clapham, Surrey, and had one son. Married (2) George Curwin 1669 and had two daughters. He died in 1684/5. She died in 1698.

Susanna died between December 18, 1654 (Edward Winslow's will) and July 2, 1675 (date of son Josiah's will). She was buried in Winslow Cemetery. Winslow Cemetery also has a substantial stone monument to "The Early Settlers of Green Harbor Marshfield" naming, among others, Susanna, Resolved and Peregrine White, and Susanna's second husband Edward Winslow.
