= Charles Edward Banks =

American medical doctor (1854–1931)

- Born: 1854; Portland, Maine, U.S.
- Died: October 22, 1931 (aged 76–77)
- Education: Dartmouth Medical College

Charles Edward Banks (1854 – October 22, 1931) was an American medical doctor best known as a historian and genealogist of colonial New England.

Among the works he is best remembered for are his history of Martha's Vineyard in three volumes (Boston, 1911–1925), his book on the English origins of immigrants to New England, and his history of York, Maine, the second volume of which he had just completed at his death in 1931.

Banks was born in Portland, Maine, in 1854. An 1877 graduate of Dartmouth Medical College, he entered the U.S. marine hospital service where he rose to the rank of colonel and ended his career as assistant surgeon general.

== Selected works ==
- Banks, Charles Edward (1911–1925). The history of Martha's Vineyard, Dukes County, Massachusetts. G. H. Dean.
- Captain Walter Gendall: A Biographical Sketch (1880)
