= Resolved White =

Mayflower passenger

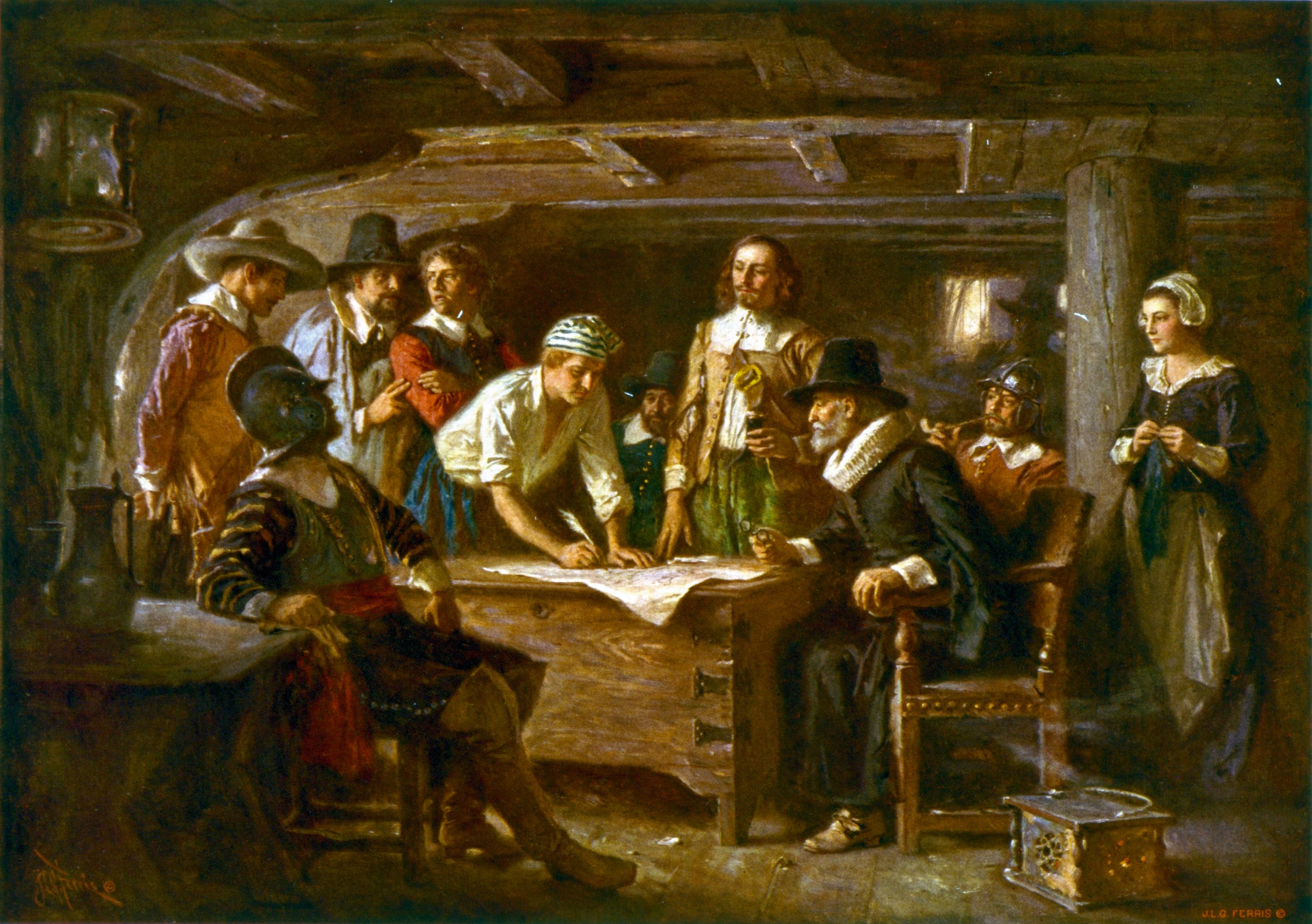
Signing the Mayflower Compact 1620, a painting by Jean Leon Gerome Ferris 1899

Resolved White (c. 1615 – after September 19, 1687) was a passenger on the Pilgrim ship Mayflower. In 1620, he accompanied his parents, Pilgrims William and Susanna White, on the journey. White married Judith Vassall, daughter of William Vassall, a founder of the Massachusetts Bay Colony. Later in life, White became a notable person of Plymouth Colony.

== English origins ==
Resolved White was the eldest son of Mayflower Pilgrims William and Susanna White. The Mayflower Society states that Susanna's maiden name is Jackson. Resolved is believed to have been about five years of age in late 1620, having been born about 1615. His mother was pregnant during the Mayflower voyage and gave birth to his brother Peregrine in late November 1620 while the ship was anchored at Cape Cod.

The Whites are believed to have boarded the Mayflower as part of the London merchant group, and not as members of the Leiden, Holland, religious movement. Evidence of the William White family coming to the Mayflower from England and not Holland comes from William Bradford's Mayflower passenger list which has "Mr. William White" in his section for London merchants along with Mr. Christopher Martin, Mr. William Mullins, Stephen Hopkins, Richard Warren and John Billington. It is believed that if William White had been a member of the Leiden congregation, his name would have appeared in Bradford's work for that section, but it does not. There is also no evidence to associate William White and his family with Leiden, Holland. Although there are various White family ancestries that place the William White family in them, the Mayflower Society states that, "Little is known about William White."

== Mayflower voyage ==
The Mayflower departed Plymouth, England, on September 6, 1620. The small, 100-foot ship had 102 passengers and a crew of about 30–40 in extremely cramped conditions. By the second month out, the ship was being buffeted by strong westerly gales, causing the ship's timbers to be badly shaken with caulking failing to keep out sea water, and with passengers, even in their berths, lying wet and ill. This, combined with a lack of proper rations and unsanitary conditions for several months, contributed to the deaths of many, especially the majority of women and children. On the way there were two deaths, a crew member and a passenger, but the worst came after arriving at their destination when, in the space of several months, almost half of the passengers perished in the cold, harsh, unfamiliar New England winter.

On November 9, 1620, after about three months at sea, including a month of delays in England, they spotted land, which was the Cape Cod Hook, now called Provincetown Harbor. After several days of trying to get south to their planned destination of the Colony of Virginia, strong winter seas forced them to return to the harbor at Cape Cod Hook, where they anchored on November 11. The Mayflower Compact was signed that day.

== In Plymouth Colony ==
William White died on February 21, 1621. With her husband's death, Susanna White, with her newborn son Peregrine and five-year-old Resolved, became the only surviving widow out of the many families who perished that first winter. On May 12, 1621, Susanna married widower Edward Winslow, a Mayflower and later Plymouth Colony notable with whom she had five children, including future Plymouth governor Josiah Winslow. In the 1627 Division of Cattle, Resolved and Peregrine were listed in the Third Lot under Capt. Standish in the family of Edward Winslow, his wife Susanna Winslow and their sons Edward and John Winslow. About 1638, the Winslows, with Peregrine and Resolved, moved to Green Harbor, now called Marshfield.

On August 3, 1640, Resolved White was granted 100 acres in Scituate next to William Vassall's land. White married Vassall's daughter, Judith, on November 5, 1640, in Scituate. In February 1642/43, a new church was founded in Scituate by William Vassall and other dissenters from the existing English Puritan church. Members, known as the "Vassall Group," called their new church the "Second Church" of Scituate. Judith White was one of the founding members of this new church. However, the religious situation in the colony forced William Vassall to leave for England a few years later, never to return to the colony. In the 1643 Able to Bear Arms (ATBA) list for Scituate, White is listed with his father-in-law and his brother-in-law, John Vassell, who would become a wealthy Caribbean plantation owner.

On May 11, 1657, White was in Barbados to witness the sale by his sister-in-law Mary Vassall of her share of William Vassall's plantation at St. Michaels. The sale was to Nicholas Ware, a merchant, who was the husband of her sister Anna.

On June 1, 1658, White was made a Freeman of Plymouth County.

On March 17, 1662, White sold land in Scituate to William Wills.

On June 3, 1668, White was elected surveyor of highways for Marshfield. Judith White was buried in Marshfield on April 3, 1670. White married Abigail Lord, the widow of Willow Lord, in Salem on October 5, 1674.

In 1676, White fought in King Philip's War. In 1680, he became a freeman in Salem, but moved back to Marshfield a couple of years later. Abigail White died in Salem between June 15 and 27, 1682.

== Death ==
White died sometime after September 19, 1687, though the exact date is uncertain. He may have been alive as late as 1690, as author Caleb Johnson reports that in that year he provided a note to Bradford's History of Plymouth Plantation stating, "Two persons living that came over in the first ship in 1620, this present year 1690: Resolved White and Mary Cushman." He apparently died within a few years of that writing.

White was buried in Winslow Cemetery in Marshfield, as was his wife Judith in 1670. The burial place of Abigail is unknown. In Winslow Cemetery there is a substantial monument to "The Settlers of Green Harbor Marshfield" that names White and his wife Judith, as well as his brother Peregrine and Peregrine's wife Sarah. Also named on the monument are White's mother Susanna and her second husband, Edward Winslow. Her date of death is uncertain – sometime between 1654 and 1675 – with burial in Winslow Cemetery. Edward Winslow died during a British military expedition in the Caribbean in 1655 and was buried at sea. A memorial to Edward Winslow exists in Winslow Cemetery.

== Children ==
Children of Resolved White and Judith:

1. William White, born on April 10 or 18, 1642, and died in Marshfield on January 24, 1695. He apparently never married.
2. John White, born on March 11, 1644, and died before 1684/5.
3. Samuel White, born in Scituate on March 13, 1646, and died between March 1729/30 and April 1731. Married Rebecca. She was born c. March 13, 1646, and died in Rochester June 25, 1711.
4. Resolved White (Jr.), born November 12, 1647, and may have died early in 1670. He was buried in Marshfield March 27, 1670, a week before the burial of his mother.
5. Anna White, born in Scituate on June 4 or 5, 1649, and died in Concord on May 25, 1714, at age 64. Married John Hayward in Concord June 2, 1671. He was born in Concord on December 20, 1640, and died there November 22, 1718, at age 78. He was the son of George and Mary Hayward.
6. Elizabeth White, born in Scituate on June 4, 1652, and was living as of March 10, 1712/13. She married Obadiah Wheeler (Jr.) in Concord on July 17, 1672. He was born in Concord c. 1650 and was living as of March 10, 1712/13. He was the son of Obadiah Wheeler Sr.
7. Josiah White, born in Scituate in September 1654 and died in Boxford between March 3 and June 5, 1710. He married before December 30, 1680, to Remember Read. She was baptized in Salem on April 26, 1657, and was living in Salem on May 20, 1721. She was the daughter of Thomas and Mary Read.
8. Susannah White, born in August 1656. No further record.

== Sources ==
- The Mayflower Society
