= Edward Winslow =

Governor of Plymouth Colony (1595–1655)

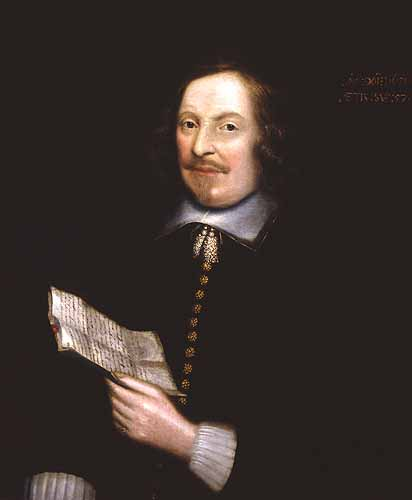

3rd, 6th & 10th Governor of Plymouth Colony
- In office 1633–1634
- Preceded by: William Bradford
- Succeeded by: Thomas Prence
- In office March 1, 1636 – March 7, 1637
- Preceded by: William Bradford
- Succeeded by: William Bradford
- In office June 3, 1639 – June 5, 1644
- Preceded by: William Bradford
- Succeeded by: William Bradford

Commissioner for Plymouth Colony
- In office 1643–1644 Serving with William Collier (1643); John Brown (1644)

Personal details
- Born: 18 October 1595 Droitwich, Worcestershire, England
- Died: 8 May 1655 (aged 59) Near Jamaica
- Relatives: Josiah Winslow (son)
- Profession: Politician and governor
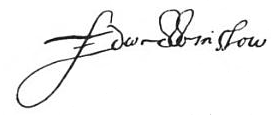
- Signature

Edward Winslow (18 October 1595 – 8 May 1655) was a Separatist and New England political leader who traveled on the Mayflower in 1620. He was one of several senior leaders on the ship and also later at Plymouth Colony. Both Edward Winslow and his brother, Gilbert Winslow signed the Mayflower Compact. In Plymouth he served in a number of governmental positions such as assistant governor, three times was governor and also was the colony's agent in London. In early 1621 he had been one of several key leaders on whom Governor Bradford depended after the death of John Carver. He was the author of several important pamphlets, including Good Newes from New England and co-wrote with William Bradford the historic Mourt's Relation, which ends with an account of the First Thanksgiving and the abundance of the New World. In 1655 he died of fever while on an English naval expedition in the Caribbean against the Spanish.

He is the only original Plymouth colonist with an extant portrait painted from life. This, along with portraits of Winslow's son and daughter-in-law, and various Winslow family artifacts, are in the Pilgrim Hall Museum, in Plymouth, Massachusetts.

== English origins ==
Coat of Arms of Edward Winslow

Edward Winslow was born on 18th October 1595 and was baptized two days later on the 20th of October at St Peter's Church, Droitwich in Worcestershire, England. He was the eldest son of Edward Winslow Sr. of Droitwich, in Worcestershire, by his wife Magdalene Oliver whom he had married the previous year at St. Bride's Church, Fleet Street, London. Edward Winslow, the father, according to family records, was born October 17, 1560, and was a descendant of the Winslow family of Kempsey, Worcestershire, a line that had existed in the county at least since 1500. The Winslow estate in Kempsey was called Kersweil with a similar name of Careswell later being given to the gentrified Plymouth estate of Governor Josiah Winslow, son of Edward Winslow and Susanna.

Author Charles Banks notes that it is highly probable that this Edward, Sr. was the son of Kenelm Winslow of Kempsey. Author Eugene Stratton believes that no one has been able to discern Kenelm Winslow's ancestry with any certainty. Kenelm Winslow, probably a brother of Edward Sr., born in 1551, was called a resident of Worcester, yeoman, in 1605. It is not certain if the family was gentry, but were at least fairly well-off. Edward Sr. was an under-sheriff and involved in the salt production trade.

Edward Winslow had four younger brothers: Gilbert (who accompanied him on the Mayflower in 1620), John, Josiah, and Kenelm, all of whom followed Edward and Gilbert to America over the next decade.

Between April 1606 and April 1611, Edward Winslow attended the King's School at Worcester Cathedral, under Henry Bright. Two years later, in August 1613, he became an apprentice contracted for a total of eight years to John Beale, a stationer and citizen of London. After an apparent legal dispute with Beale, however, Winslow's contract was re-made with his being apprenticed in October 1615, for eight years. But Winslow apparently did not fulfill his contract with Beale as about two years later, in 1617, he moved to Leiden, Holland to join the Separatist church there.

== In Leiden, 1617–1620 ==
In 1617 Edward Winslow traveled to Leiden Holland to join the English exile Separatist church and help Elder William Brewster with his underground (illicit) printing activities. Brewster and young Edward Winslow in 1618 were responsible for a religious tract, Perth Assembly, critical of the English king and his church bishops which caused an angry King James to order Brewster's arrest, sending English government agents to Holland to try to find and seize him. The Pilgrims had bad fortune in this, as Elder Brewster was forced to hide, first in Holland, then in England, from the agents just when the Pilgrims needed his leadership in preparation for their departure for America.

On April 27, 1618, Winslow married Leiden Elizabeth Barker, he being called a printer from London. Johnson reports that a search of possible English ancestral and baptismal records for Elizabeth does not reveal anything of note.

Winslow quite soon became a leading member of the English exiles meeting as the Leiden church group. On June 10, 1620, Winslow was one of four men – the others being William Bradford, Isaac Allerton, and Samuel Fuller, who wrote a letter representing the Leiden congregation to their London agents John Carver and Robert Cushman regarding the terms upon which the Pilgrims would travel to the Americas. The trip preparations became quite taxing on everyone's patience and pocket-book due to the various Thomas Weston financial schemes that used up what monies they had and as author Nathaniel Philbrick wrote: "..during preparations to sail for America, the Pilgrims demonstrated an extraordinary talent for getting duped."

== Mayflower voyage ==
Winslow and his wife Elizabeth were part of the Leiden Separatist group who had decided to travel far away from England and the repressive regime of King James I to more freely practice their religious beliefs. Merchant Adventurer investment group agent Thomas Weston assisted in this venture by providing the ship Mayflower for the Pilgrim's journey. Traveling on the Mayflower in company with the Winslows were his brother Gilbert and family servant/employee George Soule and a youth, Elias Story. Also in the care of the family was Elinor (Ellen) More, a girl of eight years. In all there were four unaccompanied More children from Shipton, Shropshire in the care of senior Pilgrims on the Mayflower: Elinor, Jasper, Mary and Richard. Elinor perished the winter of 1620 with only one brother Richard More surviving.

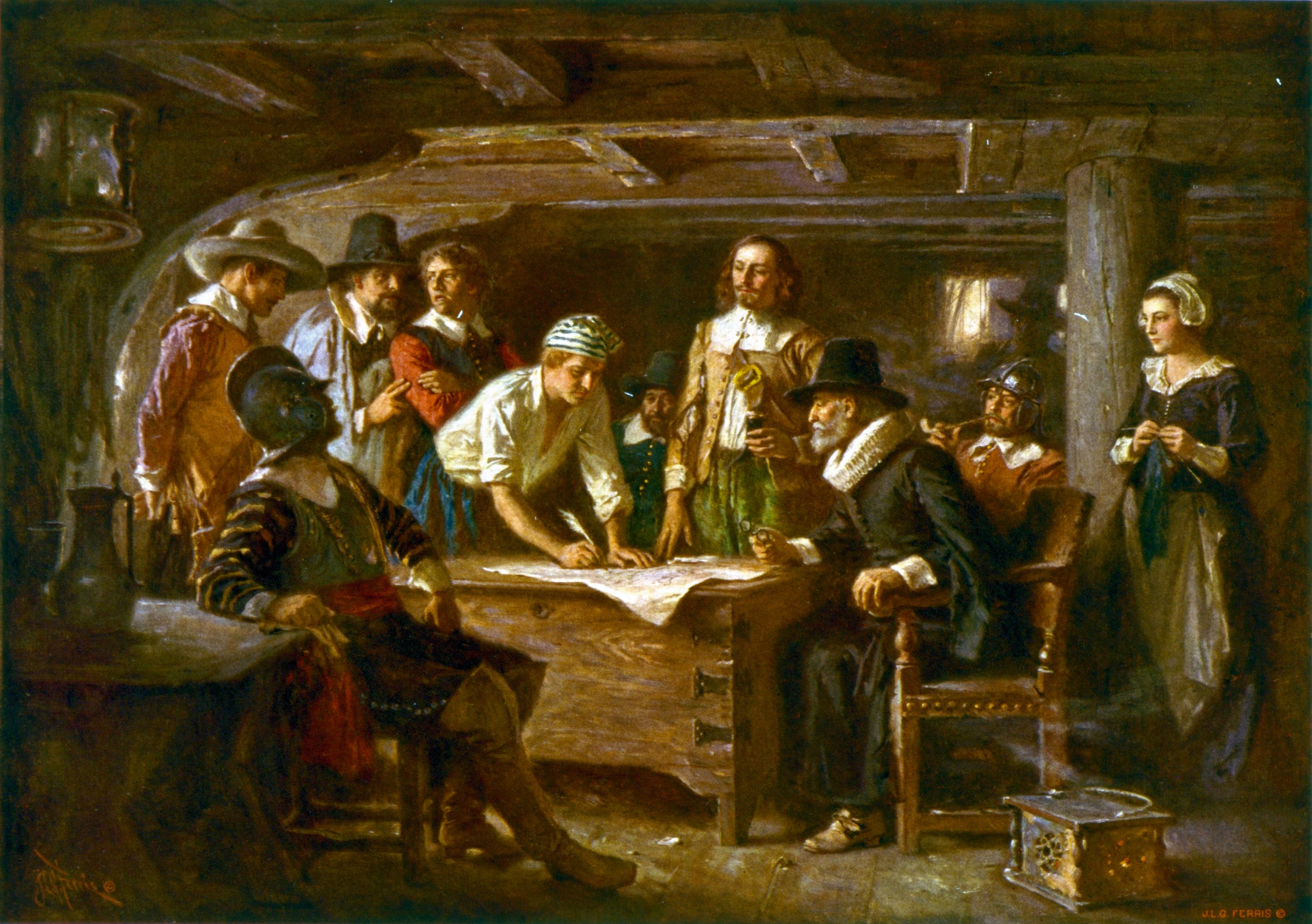
Signing the Mayflower Compact 1620, a painting by Jean Leon Gerome Ferris 1899. Winslow is the man standing in the center of the painting, with his right hand on the document and the ink horn in his left hand.

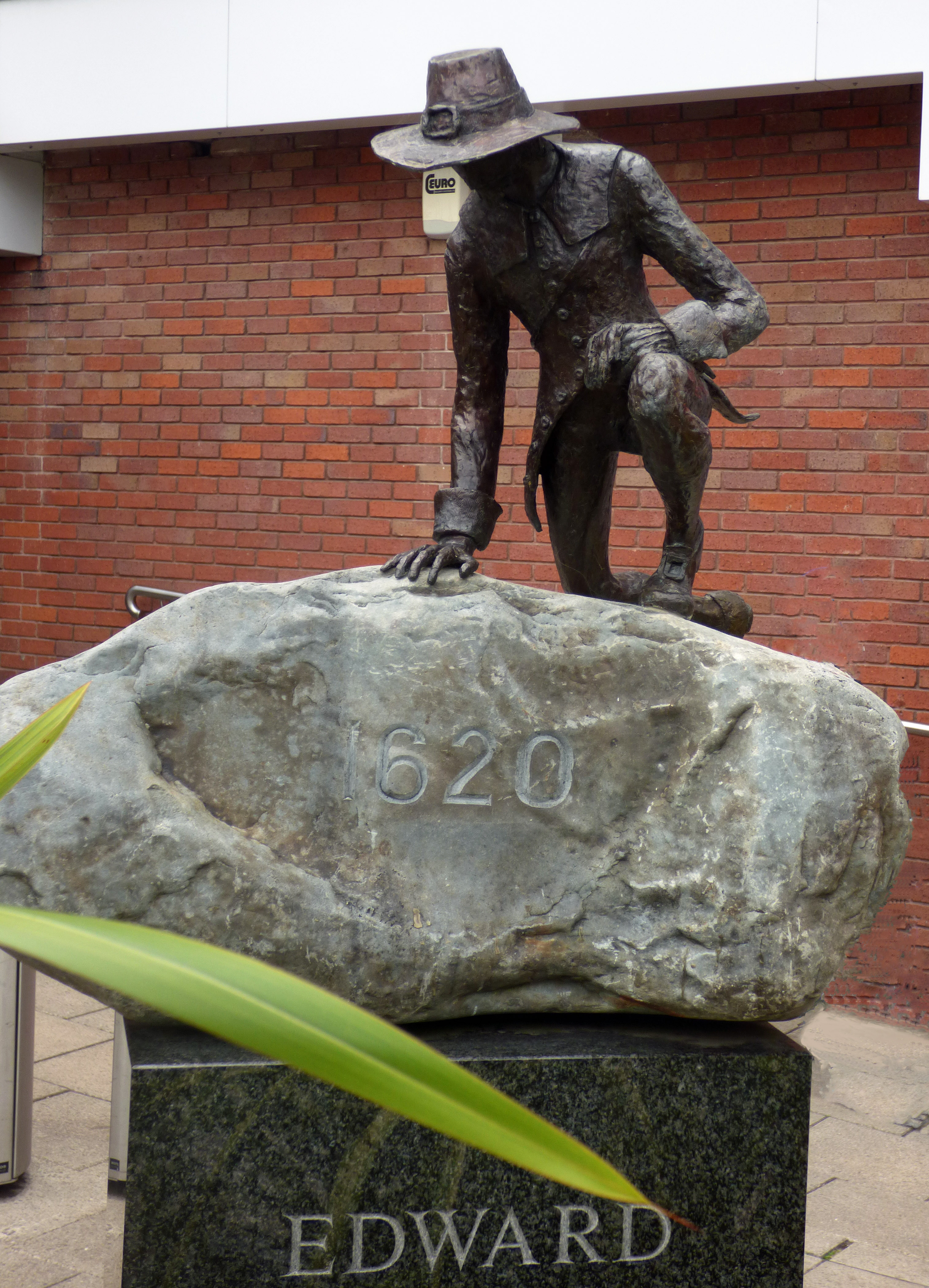
Statue of Edward Winslow in St. Andrew's Square, Droitwich Spa, England.

The Mayflower departed Plymouth, England on September 6/16, 1620. The small, 100-foot ship had 102 passengers and the crew is estimated to be approximately 30 but the exact number is unknown. They lived in extremely cramped conditions. By the second month out, the ship was being buffeted by strong westerly gales, causing the ship's timbers to be badly shaken with caulking failing to keep out sea water, and with passengers, even in their berths, lying wet and ill. This, combined with a lack of proper rations and unsanitary conditions for several months, attributed to what would be fatal for many, especially the majority of women and children. On the way, there were two deaths, a crew member and a passenger, but the worst was yet to come after arriving at their destination when, in the space of several months, almost half the passengers perished in cold, harsh, unfamiliar New England winter.

On November 9/19, 1620, after about three months at sea, including a month of delays in England, they spotted land, which was the Cape Cod Hook. After several days of trying to get south to their planned destination of the Colony of Virginia, strong winter seas forced them to return to the shelter of Cape Cod hook, now called Provincetown Harbor, where they anchored on November 11/21. The Mayflower Compact was signed that day.

== In Plymouth Colony ==
Governors of Plymouth Colony
Dates	Governor
1620	John Carver
1621–1632	William Bradford
1633	Edward Winslow
1634	Thomas Prence
1635	William Bradford
1636	Edward Winslow
1637	William Bradford
1638	Thomas Prence
1639–1643	William Bradford
1644	Edward Winslow
1645–1656	William Bradford
1657–1672	Thomas Prence
1673–1679	Josiah Winslow
1680–1692	Thomas Hinckley

The ill-prepared and poorly supplied colonists lost over half of their population through a multitude of problems – including hunger, scurvy, other diseases and their first bitter winter on the North American mainland. In the spring of 1621, Winslow and the others attended what would become known as the first Thanksgiving.

The people who survived all worked hard to provide food and shelter. Amidst criticism from Thomas Weston for not loading up the returning Mayflower with goods for the investors, William Bradford sent a letter stating the troubles encountered by the Mayflower passengers. He blamed Weston, and stated that Governor Carver had worked himself to death that spring and the loss of him and other industrious men lives cannot be valued at any price.

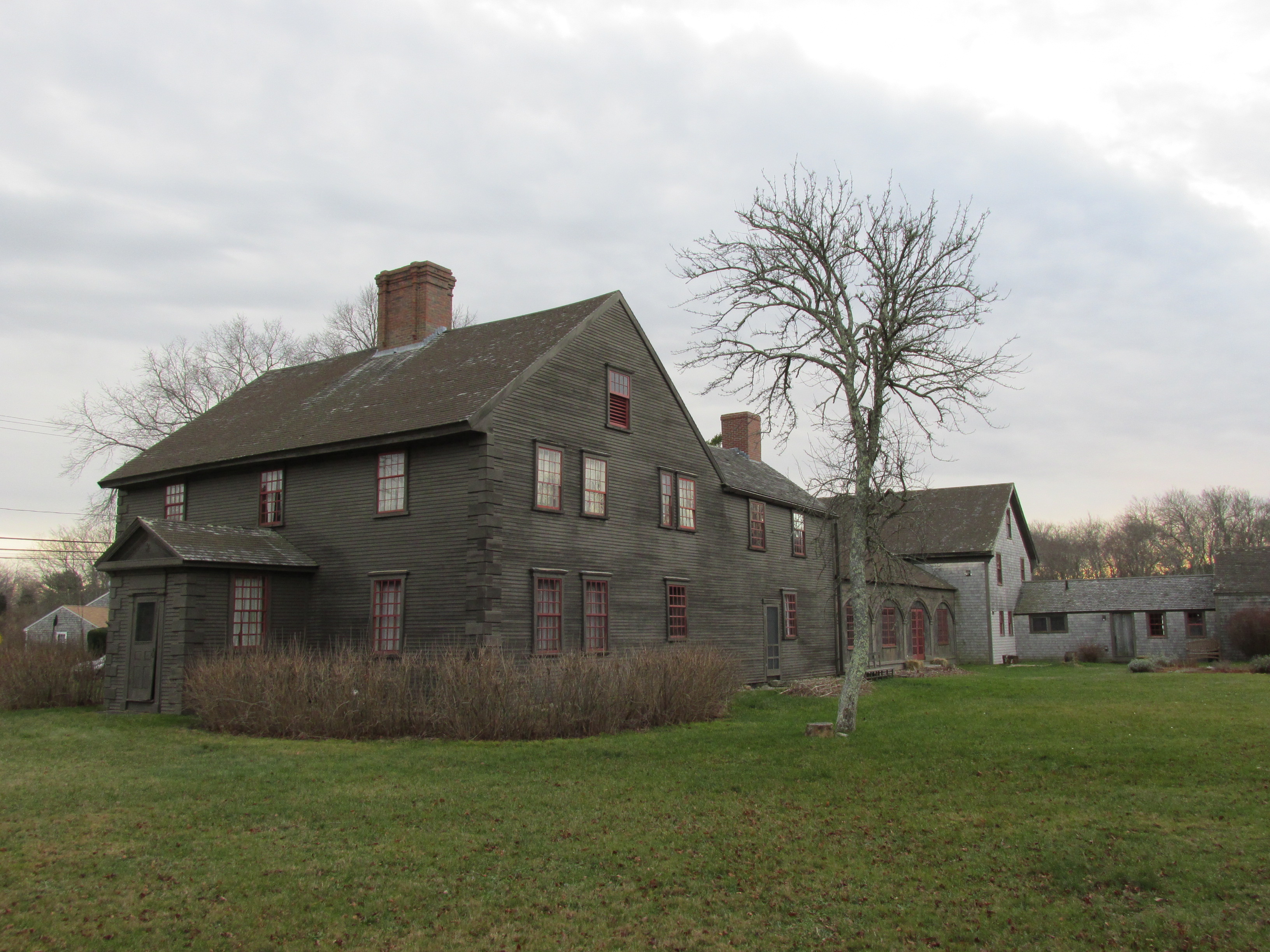
The Isaac Winslow House was built by Edward Winslow's grandson. This was the third house built on land granted to Edward Winslow (1595–1655) in the 1630s who erected the first homestead there.

The following year the ship Fortune arrived at Plymouth colony but again, Thomas Weston had inadequately supplied the ship for the colony. With winter approaching, the colonists only had half the needed supplies, but as William Bradford recorded, 'they all faced it bravely'.

The following year, despite the adversities of the winter, the colonists were able to load the Fortune for England with enough furs and other supplies to pay for over half of their indebtedness to the Merchant Adventurers, but the ship was attacked by the French as it came near the English coast and all the cargo was taken by the privateers.

On February 21, 1621, William White died leaving a widow, Susanna, and two sons, Resolved and Peregrine, the first child born in the colony. Edward Winslow lost his wife Elizabeth on March 24, 1621, and just a month and a half later, on May 12, 1621, Edward Winslow and Susanna White became the first couple to marry in Plymouth Colony. They were married in a civil ceremony by Governor William Bradford. The couple had three sons, one daughter, and one unknown child who died young.

== Leadership at Plymouth Colony and with Cromwell in England ==
Winslow made several voyages back to England in the 1620s, serving as ambassador for the Pilgrims and negotiating with the colony's financial backers. In 1624, he brought the first cattle – three cows and a bull – to Plymouth. They came from Devon, England, and their descendants became the American Milking Devon breed, which were much valued because they could be used for milk, beef, and as oxen, and were good foragers (did not require supplemental feed).

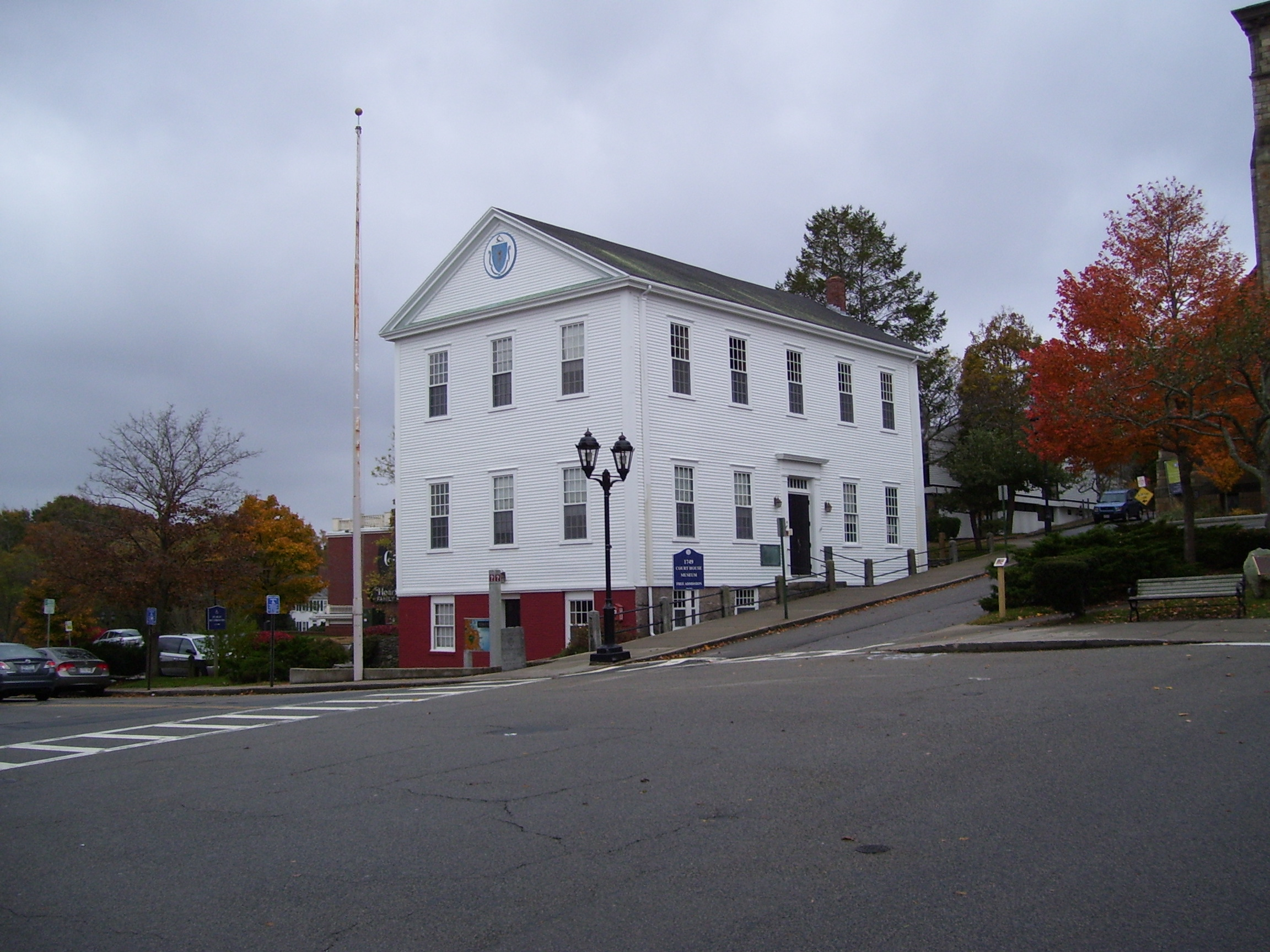
Winslow's first house in Plymouth was located on the site of what is now the 1749 Court House Museum on Town Square in downtown Plymouth.

Winslow had established a friendship with native leader Massasoit, whose people were trading with the colonists. In January 1629 a new patent for land at Kennebec was approved which provided for a fishing and trading post at Pentagoet and a fortified trading post at Cushnoc on the Kennebec which opened the area to Plymouth colonists. At the same time, Isaac Allerton opened his own trading post on the Kenebec and thereby became a rival of Edward Winslow, setting a pattern for the adversarial rivalry between them that would continue from that time on.

In 1632, he made an exploratory tour up the Connecticut River for colonization. It is suggested that he landed and selected the settlement which became Windsor.

Edward Winslow was an experienced diplomat acting for Plymouth in its relationship with English officials. He later was Plymouth governor for one-year terms from 1633–34, 1636–37, and 1644–45. Additionally, in 1643 Winslow was one of the commissioners of the United Colonies of New England, which was a military group uniting the various New England colonies against the natives.

By the early 1640s England was engaged in a great civil war. Some settlers returned to England to join the efforts to overthrow the reigning King, Charles I. In 1646, Winslow began working for Oliver Cromwell, Lord Protector. After King Charles was executed in 1649, Edward Winslow had plans to return to Plymouth but soon became involved in the problems of England. He would never return to Plymouth.

Winslow lived for a short time in Clapham, Surrey together with a number of radical Puritan merchants, including James Sherley one of the financiers of the Mayflower. These merchants supported his campaign to send missionaries to the Indians in North America.

In 1654, Winslow was commissioner of an English naval mission against the Spanish in the West Indies. They were victorious but Winslow contracted yellow fever and died on May 7, 1655, near Jamaica.

== Marriage and children ==
Edward Winslow married:

1. Elizabeth Barker after May 12, 1618, in Leiden Holland. She died on March 24, 1621, in Plymouth Colony. Elizabeth was buried in 1621 in the Cole's Hill Burial Ground in Plymouth.
2. Susanna White (Jackson) daughter of Richard and Mary (Pettinger) Jackson on May 12, 1621, in Plymouth Colony. She died between December 18, 1654 (Edward Winslow's will) and July 2, 1675 (date of son Josiah's will).

Children of Edward Winslow and his wife Susanna White Jackson:

- (child) born and died in 1622 or 1623
- Edward Winslow – born c. 1624. No record after May 22, 1627.
- John Winslow – born c. 1626. No record after May 22, 1627.
- Josiah Winslow, 13th Governor of Plymouth Colony – born c. 1627. Married Penelope Pelham by 1658 and had four children. He died in 1680. She died in 1703.
- Elizabeth Winslow – born c. 1631. Married (1) Robert Brooks on 8 April 1656 in Clapham, Surrey, and had one son. Married (2) George Curwin 1669 and had two daughters. He died 1684/5. She died in 1698.

Children of Susanna White's first marriage with William White who became Edward Winslow's step-sons:

- Resolved White – born c. 1615. Married 1640 (1) Judith Vassall, daughter of William Vassall, and had eight children. Resolved married 1674 (2) Abigail ____ Lord. She died 1682. He died 1687.
- Peregrine White – born late November 1620 on board the Mayflower in Cape Cod Harbor. First English child born in that part of America. Married c. 1648/9 Sarah Bassett daughter of William Bassett, and had seven children. He died 1704. She died 1711.

== Death and memorial of Winslow ==
Winslow is reported to have been buried at sea in the Caribbean somewhere between Hispaniola and Jamaica, sometime after May 7, 1655. Winslow Cemetery in Marshfield, Massachusetts has a stone monument to "The Settlers of Green Harbor Marshfield" with the name of Edward Winslow and his wife Susanna and many others. This includes the names of Susanna's sons Resolved and Peregrine White and their wives. Also in Winslow Cemetery is a memorial stone with plaque stating "Edward Winslow, Founder of Marshfield". An elementary school known as the Governor Edward Winslow School or "GWS", is also in Green Harbor, Marshfield, and bears his name in remembrance nearby his historical home.

== Works ==
His writings, though fragmentary, are of the greatest value to the history of the Plymouth colony. They include:

- Good Newes from New England, or a True Relation of Things very Remarkable at the Plantation of Plimouth in New England (1624) sold by John Bellamy;
- Hypocrisie Unmasked; by a True Relation of the Governor and Company of Massachusetts against Samuel Gorton, a Notorious Disturber of the Peace (1646), to which was added a chapter entitled "A Brief Narration of the True Grounds or Cause of the First Plantation of New England" sold by John Bellamy;
- New England's Salamander (1647);
- The Danger of Tolerating Levelers in a Civil State (1649) and;
- The Glorious Progress of the Gospel amongst the Indians in New England (1649) with John Eliot and Thomas Mayhew Jr. sold by John Bellamy.

Edward Winslow, along with William Bradford are believed to have prepared a Journal of the Beginning and Proceeding of the English Plantation settled at Plymouth in New England, published in 1622, which is generally known as Mourt's Relation, owing to its preface having been signed by "G. Mourt."

Some of his writings may be found reprinted in Alexander Young's Chronicles of the Pilgrims.

== Cultural references ==
- Gilbert Morris's House of Winslow series covers the family fortunes of Gilbert Winslow and his descendants to the twenty-first century.
- Television Mini-Series, “Saints and Strangers”. A story of the first settlers in America.

== See also ==
- Mayflower Society
