= Henry Warren Rogers =

American architect (1831–1915)

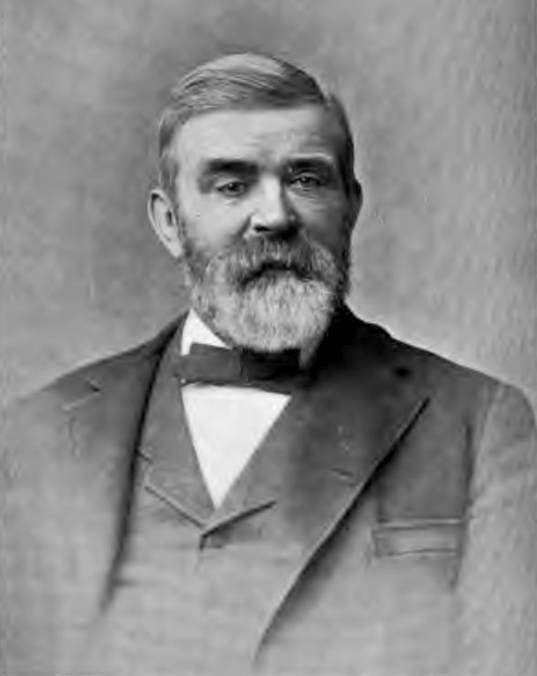
- Born: November 20, 1831; Lynn, Massachusetts
- Died: January 30, 1915 (aged 83); Lynn, Massachusetts
- Occupation: Architect
- Buildings: Fabens Building; Swampscott Fish House; Lynn Realty Company Buildings

Signature
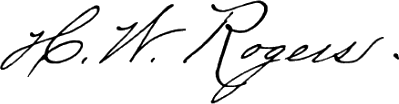

Henry Warren Rogers (1831-1915) was an American architect practicing during the late nineteenth and early twentieth centuries in Lynn, Massachusetts.

== Early life and career ==
Henry W. Rogers was born November 20, 1831, in Lynn, Massachusetts, to Warren and Elizabeth (Potter) Rogers. He attended the public schools of Lynn and Marshfield, to which town his family moved in 1841. In 1846 he was apprenticed to Isaac Waterman, a shipbuilder of Medford, Massachusetts. In 1853 he instead took up housebuilding, and returned to Lynn in 1855. For some years he was employed as a foreman by Nehemiah Lee. Being responsible for the design of many of the buildings he built, he gradually turned to architecture. In 1879 he formally abandoned carpentry and opened an architect's office in Lynn. By 1882 he had associated himself with his elder son, Hamilton Everett Rogers. After the death of the elder Rogers, Hamilton E. Rogers continued to practice under his father's name until 1917. His own death occurred on December 30, 1920.

== Personal life ==
Rogers was first married to Caroline Augusta Bates (1834-1875) in 1854. She died in 1875, and he remarried in 1880, to Olive Ann Randall (1847-1938) of North Berwick, Maine. Rogers had three children, all with Caroline Augusta: Henrietta Eunice (1855-1919), Hamilton Everett (1857-1920) and Clarence Abel Rogers (1859-1941). Both sons followed him into the architecture profession. Henry Warren Rogers died January 30, 1915.

Rogers was a descendant of one John Rogers, who immigrated to Marshfield, Massachusetts, from England in 1635, aboard the Hercules.

== Legacy ==
At least four of Rogers' works have been individually listed on the United States National Register of Historic Places, and others contribute to listed historic districts.

Rogers and his son were responsible for the design of many buildings built after the Great Fire of 1889. Two from this period, the Fabens and Woodbury Buildings, are considered to be the best examples of the Richardsonian Romanesque style in Lynn.

== Architectural works ==
Year	Project	Address	City	State	Notes	Image	References
1880	Boyden House	280 Union St	Lynn	Massachusetts	Extant but heavily altered.		
1880	St. Mary R. C. School	30 Pleasant St	Lynn	Massachusetts	Listed on the National Register of Historic Places as part of the Lynn Common Historic District in 1992.		
1882	House for Joseph E. Hood	4 Ash St	Danvers	Massachusetts			
1884	Receiving Tomb, Swampscott Cemetery	400 Essex St	Swampscott	Massachusetts	Listed on the National Register of Historic Places as part of the Swampscott Cemetery in 2013.		
1890	Fabens Building	312 Union St	Lynn	Massachusetts	Listed on the National Register of Historic Places in 1982.		
1890	House for Isaiah Crossman	50 Beacon Hill Ave	Lynn	Massachusetts			
1890	Woodbury Building	145 Munroe St	Lynn	Massachusetts	Listed on the National Register of Historic Places as part of the Central Square Historic District in 1985.		
1891	Dagyr Building	11 Willow St	Lynn	Massachusetts	Listed on the National Register of Historic Places as part of the Central Square Historic District in 1985.		
1891	Pevear Building	501 Washington St	Lynn	Massachusetts	Listed on the National Register of Historic Places as part of the Central Square Historic District in 1985.		
1892	Factories for S. N. Breed & Company	647-677 Washington St	Lynn	Massachusetts	Demolished.		
1892	Factory for the Aaron F. Smith Company	589 Essex St	Lynn	Massachusetts			
1892	Tenements for Patrick B. Magrane	12-20 Elm and 225-229 S Common Sts	Lynn	Massachusetts			
1893	Rectory for St. Mary R. C. Church	8 S Common St	Lynn	Massachusetts	Listed on the National Register of Historic Places as part of the Lynn Common Historic District in 1992.		
1895	Factory for Sawyer & Chase	584-598 Washington St	Lynn	Massachusetts	Demolished.		
1895	House for Frances G. Keene	11 Grosvenor Park	Lynn	Massachusetts	Listed on the National Register of Historic Places as part of the Diamond Historic District in 1996.		
1896	House for John Cotter	15 Harwood St	Lynn	Massachusetts			
1896	House for Charles E. Forbes	34 King St	Lynn	Massachusetts	Listed on the National Register of Historic Places as part of the Diamond Historic District in 1996.		
1896	House for Henry Warren Rogers	30 King St	Lynn	Massachusetts	The architect's own home. Listed on the National Register of Historic Places as part of the Diamond Historic District in 1996.		
1896	Laboratory for the Lydia E. Pinkham Manufacturing Company	271 Western Ave	Lynn	Massachusetts	Rogers would do other work for the company founded by Lydia E. Pinkham, including a warehouse addition in 1898.		
1896	Swampscott Fish House	425 Humphrey St	Swampscott	Massachusetts	Listed on the National Register of Historic Places in 1985.		
1897	Aborn School	409 Eastern Ave	Lynn	Massachusetts			
1897	Cottage for Hannah Wardwell	2 Surf St	Marblehead	Massachusetts			
1897	House for Byron E. Glover	179 Ocean St	Lynn	Massachusetts			
1897	House for Stephen B. Howe	68 Newhall St	Lynn	Massachusetts			
1897	Clift Rodgers Free Library (former)	83 Old Main St	Marshfield Hills	Massachusetts	Listed on the National Register of Historic Places as part of the Marshfield Hills Historic District in 2009.		
1898	House for Ernest Dodge	6 Rodman St	Roslindale, Boston	Massachusetts	Listed on the National Register of Historic Places as part of the Woodbourne Historic District in 1999.		
1898	Lewis School	583 Chestnut St	Lynn	Massachusetts			
1899	House for Frank E Wells	2643 Dartmouth College Highway	North Haverhill	New Hampshire			
1900	Daily Item Building	38 Exchange St	Lynn	Massachusetts			
1901	Lynn Realty Company Building No. 1	190-192 Broad St	Lynn	Massachusetts	Demolished.		
1902	Lynn Realty Company Building No. 2	678 Washington St	Lynn	Massachusetts	Listed on the National Register of Historic Places in 1983.		
1902	Lynn Realty Company Building No. 3	696 Washington St	Lynn	Massachusetts	Demolished.		
1903	Lynn Realty Company Building No. 4	7 Liberty Sq	Lynn	Massachusetts	Listed on the National Register of Historic Places in 1983 as the Vamp Building.		
1904	St. John the Evangelist R. C. Church	174 Humphrey St	Swampscott	Massachusetts			
1907	Lynn Realty Company Building No. 6	266 Broad St	Lynn	Massachusetts	Demolished.		
1907	Lynn Realty Company Building No. 7	278 Broad St	Lynn	Massachusetts	Demolished.		
1909	House for John R. Donovan	26 Peirce Rd	Lynn	Massachusetts			
1911	House for Lloyd G. Lewis	87 Ocean St	Lynn	Massachusetts			
1915	Garage and apartment for Frederick S. Pevear	21 Henry Ave	Lynn	Massachusetts			
1916	House for Cornelius J. Shea	31 King St	Lynn	Massachusetts	Listed on the National Register of Historic Places as part of the Diamond Historic District in 1996.		
1917	Convent for St. Mary R. C. Church	32 City Hall Sq	Lynn	Massachusetts			
