= Ryan Gibbons =

Ryan Gibbons may refer to:

- Ryan Gibbons (American football) (born 1983), American football offensive lineman
- Ryan Gibbons (cyclist) (born 1994), South African cyclist
