= Green Harbor-Cedar Crest, Massachusetts =

Green Harbor-Cedar Crest
- Former census-designated place
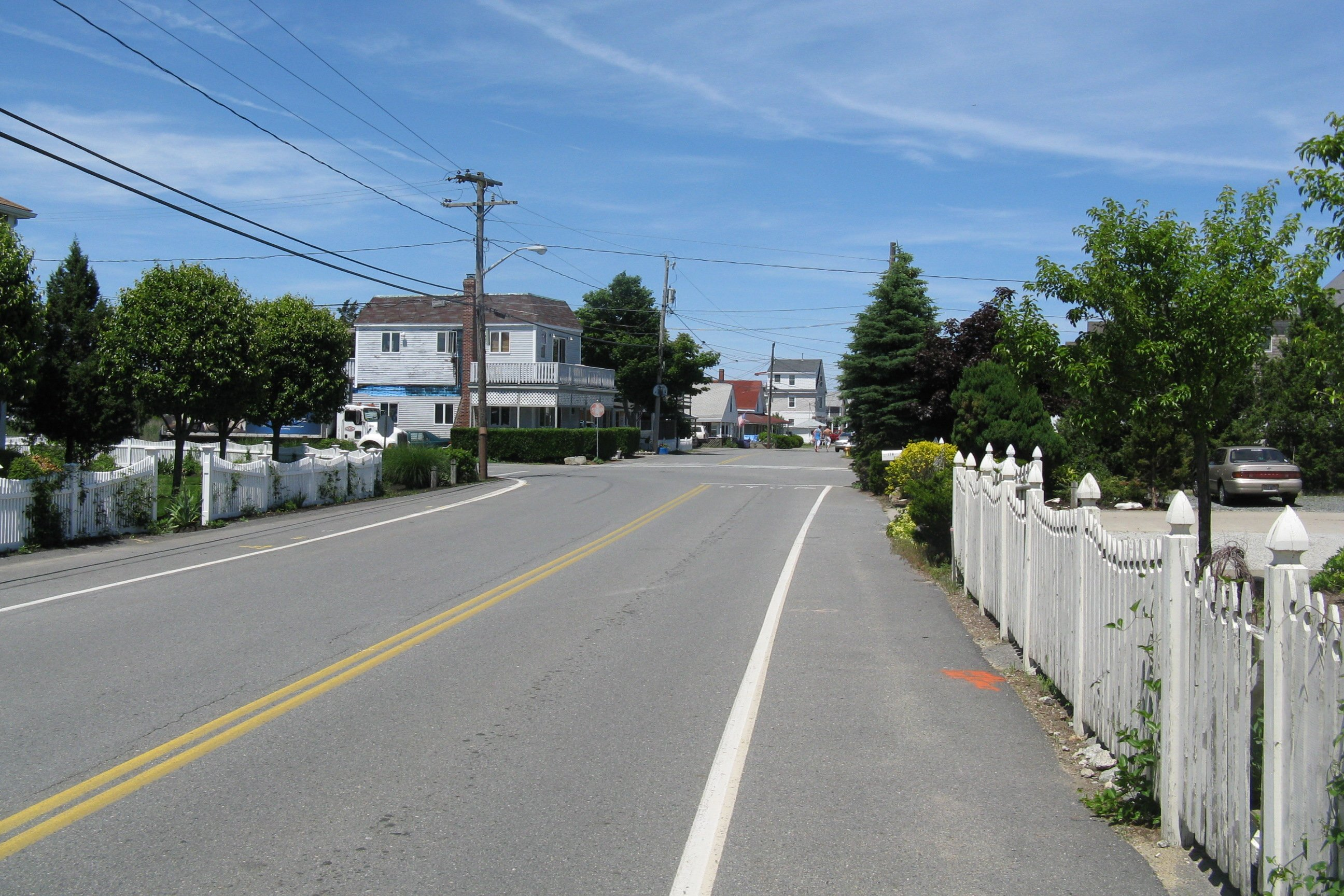
- Bay Avenue in Green Harbor

- Location within Massachusetts Location within the United States
- Coordinates: 42°4′29″N 70°39′30″W
- Country: United States
- State: Massachusetts
- County: Plymouth
- Towns: Duxbury; Marshfield

Area
  - Total: 1.9 sq mi (5.0 km^{2})
  - Land: 1.8 sq mi (4.6 km^{2})
  - Water: 0.15 sq mi (0.4 km^{2})

Population (2010)
  - Total: 2,609
  - Density: 1,500/sq mi (570/km^{2})
- Time zone: UTC-5 (Eastern (EST))
  - Summer (DST): UTC-4 (EDT)
- ZIP code
- Area code: 339 / 781
- FIPS code: 25-27147

Green Harbor-Cedar Crest was a census-designated place (CDP) in the towns of Duxbury and Marshfield in Plymouth County, United States. It included the village of Green Harbor, on the shore of Massachusetts Bay, and the community of Cedar Crest, occupying a hill on the north side of Careswell Street. The population of the CDP was 2,609 at the 2010 census. Prior to the 2020 census the area was split into two CDPs, Green Harbor and Cedar Crest.

== Geography ==
The Green Harbor-Cedar Crest CDP was located at 42°4′25″N 70°39′22″W (42.073624, -70.656161).

According to the United States Census Bureau, the CDP had a total area of 5.0 km^{2} (1.9 sq mi), of which 4.6 km^{2} (1.8 sq mi) was land and 0.4 km^{2} (0.15 sq mi) (8.29%) was water.

== Demographics ==
As of the census of 2000, there were 2,397 people, 869 households, and 662 families residing in the CDP. The population density was 519.9 people /km^{2} (1,347 people/mi^{2}). There were 1,117 housing units at an average density of 242.3 units /km^{2} (628 units/mi^{2}). The racial makeup of the CDP was 98.50% White, 0.38% African American, 0.08% Native American, 0.21% Asian, 0.04% Pacific Islander, 0.54% from other races, and 0.25% from two or more races. Hispanic or Latino of any race were 1.21% of the population.

There were 869 households, out of which 37.5% had children under the age of 18 living with them, 62.0% were married couples living together, 10.5% had a female householder with no husband present, and 23.8% were non-families. 18.4% of all households were made up of individuals, and 5.6% had someone living alone who was 65 years of age or older. The average household size was 2.76 and the average family size was 3.18.

In the CDP, the population was spread out, with 27.0% under the age of 18, 5.7% from 18 to 24, 31.6% from 25 to 44, 26.5% from 45 to 64, and 9.2% who were 65 years of age or older. The median age was 38 years. For every 100 females, there were 92.8 males. For every 100 females age 18 and over, there were 89.4 males.

The median income for a household in the CDP was $74,375, and the median income for a family was $81,275. Males had a median income of $43,750 versus $38,913 for females. The per capita income for the CDP was $29,200. About 1.8% of families and 2.6% of the population were below the poverty line, including 2.4% of those under age 18 and none of those age 65 or over.
