= Sean Morey (American football) =

American football player (born 1976)

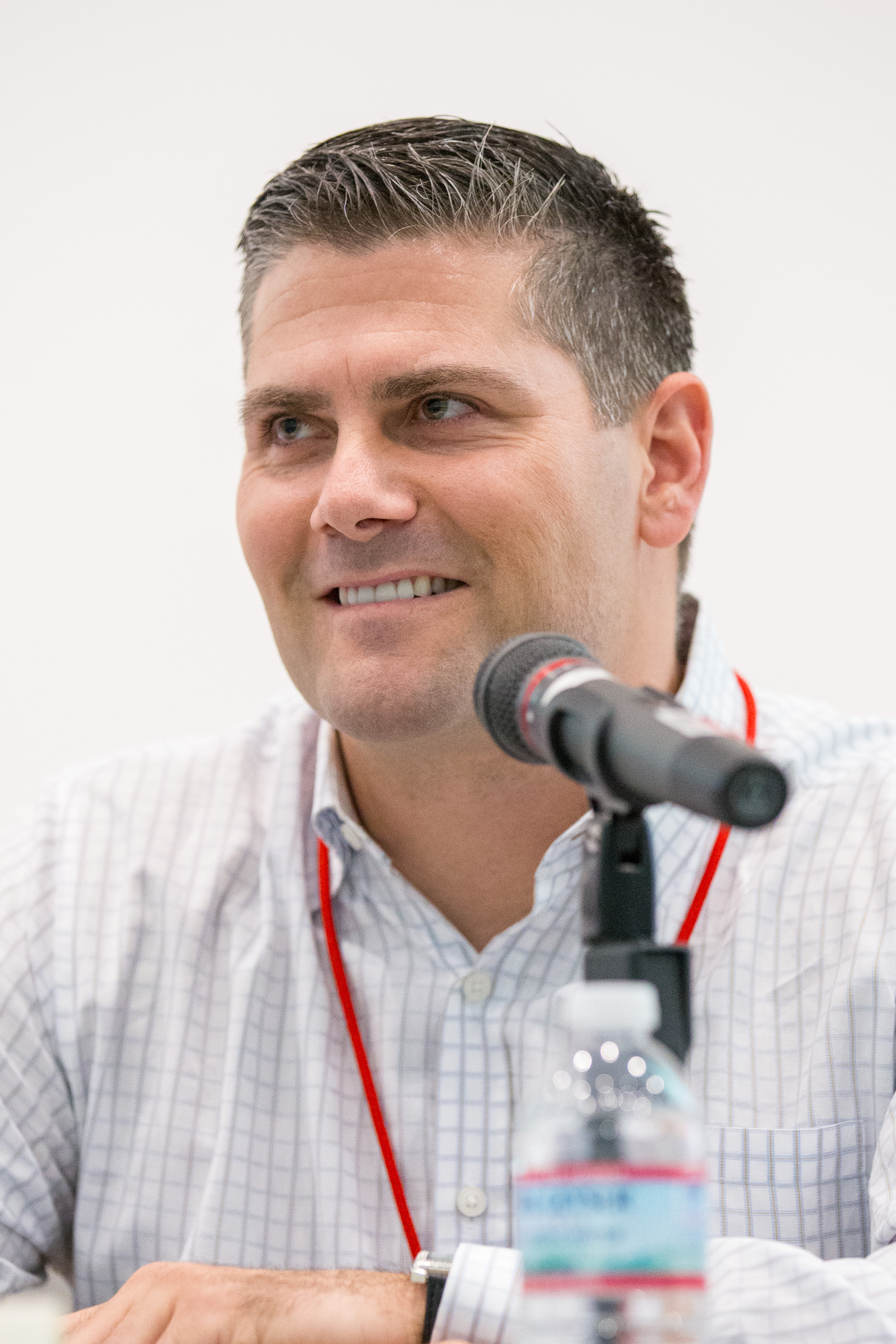
- Morey in 2014

No. 85, 19, 81, 87
- Position: Wide receiver

Personal information
- Born: February 26, 1976 (age 50); Marshfield, Massachusetts, U.S.
- Listed height: 5 ft 11 in (1.80 m)
- Listed weight: 193 lb (88 kg)

Career information
- High school: Marshfield
- College: Brown
- NFL draft: 1999: 7th round, 241st overall pick

Career history
- New England Patriots (1999–2000), (2001)*; Barcelona Dragons (2000-2001); Philadelphia Eagles (2001), (2003); → Barcelona Dragons (2003); Pittsburgh Steelers (2004–2006); Arizona Cardinals (2007–2009); Seattle Seahawks (2010)*
- * Offseason or practice squad member only

Awards and highlights
- Super Bowl champion (XL); Pro Bowl (2008)

Career NFL statistics
- Receptions: 11
- Receiving yards: 168
- Return yards: 358
- Stats at Pro Football Reference

Sean Joseph Morey (born February 26, 1976) is an American former professional football player who was a wide receiver in the National Football League (NFL). He played college football for the Brown Bears. He was selected by the New England Patriots in the seventh round of the 1999 NFL draft. Morey also played for the Philadelphia Eagles, Pittsburgh Steelers and Arizona Cardinals. He won Super Bowl XL with the Steelers against the Seattle Seahawks.

== Early life ==
Morey graduated from Marshfield High School of Marshfield, Massachusetts in 1994. Because of his light weight, Morey did not receive a scholarship offer from his dream school Boston College and had a partial scholarship offer from Northeastern University, so he decided to attend Hebron Academy. At Hebron, Morey led the football team to win the New England Prep School Class D Championship in 1994. He would win All-Evergreen League Team, Evergreen League MVP, and Class D New England Player of the Year while playing football for Hebron. He played both wide receiver and defensive back while in high school.

== College career ==
After graduating from Hebron Academy, he attended Brown University, where he finished with an Ivy League record 251 receptions for 3,850 yards and 40 touchdowns, and was voted Ivy League player of the year in 1997 — when he caught 74 passes for an Ivy League-record 1,434 yards and 15 touchdowns. Sean was one of seven Brown players selected as First-Team All-Ivy League in 1998, including Stephen Campbell (WR), Zack Burns (TE), Tim Hevesy (C), James Perry (QB), Alex Pittz (CB) and Ephraim "Fry" Wernick (DL). Sean Morey finished his career second in all-time receiving yards in Division I-AA behind only Jerry Rice. After his college career, Sean was the first Brown player to have his number retired. He also earned a degree with honors in organizational behavior and management.

Morey won the Ivy League Bushnell Cup in 1997.

== Professional career ==
=== New England Patriots ===
Morey was originally selected with the 35th pick of the seventh round of the 1999 NFL draft by the New England Patriots. After making the 52 man roster, Morey spent the majority of his rookie season on the practice squad until the final four games. Morey played the last two games of the season, tallying four special teams tackles, with a tackle inside the 20yd line on kickoff vs. Baltimore.

=== Philadelphia Eagles ===
In 2001 Morey joined the Philadelphia Eagles where he would become 2003 Special Teams MVP. That same year he was nominated for Dr. Z's (Sports Illustrated) All-Pro team as a special teams player. Also in 2003, Morey became the 12th player in NFL Europe history to catch 3 touchdown passes in a game while playing for the Barcelona Dragons.

=== Pittsburgh Steelers ===
The Steelers acquired Morey September 6, 2004 as an unrestricted free agent. He was captain of special teams for Pittsburgh. Morey's role for the Steelers was mostly special teams; he did not usually line up at wide receiver. In 2006, Morey's role expanded because of injuries to wide receivers Hines Ward and Cedrick Wilson. He finished the season with just 2 receptions (bringing his career total to 3), but also contributed with his blocking and with his work on special teams. He had 21 special teams tackles while also returning eight kickoffs for 202 yards (25.3 yard avg.). In a Week 11 24–20 victory over the Browns, he had a 76-yard kick return.

=== Arizona Cardinals ===
The Arizona Cardinals signed Morey on March 15, 2007, to a three-year free agent contract. Morey rejoined ex-Steeler coaches Ken Whisenhunt (head coach), Russ Grimm (assistant head coach / offensive line) and Kevin Spencer (special teams) in Arizona.

The Cardinals released Morey on March 17, 2008, but re-signed him on March 26.

Morey blocked a punt in overtime against the Cowboys on October 12, 2008, that was run in by teammate, Monty Beisel, for the game-winning touchdown. It was the first time in NFL history that a game was ended in overtime by a blocked punt that resulted in a touchdown.

Morey was selected to the Pro Bowl in 2008 as a special teamer.

=== Seattle Seahawks ===
Morey signed with the Seattle Seahawks on March 29, 2010. He never played a game for them, however, announcing his retirement due to concussions just hours before the start of training camp on July 31.

== Coaching career ==
In February 2014, Morey accepted the head coach position for the sprint football team at Princeton University. For the two previous years, he was a Department of Athletics Fellow for general administration at Princeton. Princeton shut down the sprint football team after two seasons with Morey as coach; Morey failed to win a single game as coach of the Tigers, continuing a 16-year-long losing streak.

Morey is a high school football coach at Notre Dame High School in Lawrenceville, New Jersey, where he serves as defensive coordinator.

== Concussion activism ==
In May 2014, Morey, along with a group of plaintiffs, filed a formal objection to the National Football League Players' Concussion Injury Litigation and Proposed Settlement being overseen by US District Court Judge Anita Brody. The objection sought to highlight what some players see as a narrow scope of the settlement, claiming, among other things, that "The settlement would have compensated only a small subset of [mild-traumatic-brain-injury-related] injuries to the exclusion of all others."

Morey served on a number of committees for the NFL Players Association, voted as a Player Rep and Executive Committee Member, notably as an advocate for player health, safety and welfare. In October 2010, Morey helped form and was appointed co-chair of the NFLPA Mackey-White TBI Committee. Morey suffered more than twenty concussions in his career. Morey's committee had two overarching goals: to improve the diagnosis, treatment, and prevention of cumulative concussions in active players and support research focused on the potential long-term cumulative effects of traumatic brain injuries on NFL players. He served during the 2011 lockout, advocating for comprehensive clinical research, programs to serve former and transitioning NFL Players, and helped negotiate the creation of the Neurocognitive Disability Benefit.

On January 31, 2014, Morey and his wife Cara were interviewed about traumatic brain injury in football players by Melissa Block on NPR's "All Things Considered."

Sean appeared in a documentary called "The United States of Football", by Sean Pamphilon.

== Personal life ==
Morey has three siblings, Mark Dare, Dean Morey and his twin sister Erin Morey. Erin was voted best athlete of their graduating class in 1994 at Marshfield High School. Sean's father, Dennis, was a commercial fisherman out of Green Harbor for over 40 years, with his brother Dean following in his fathers footsteps, as a local lobsterman. Dennis was a standout athlete at Brockton High School, continuing to play semi-pro football with the Brockton Pros and Middleboro Cobras of the EFL for Bob Teahan.

Sean's grandfather, Joe, was a legendary basketball coach for Brockton High School. His great uncle, Dick, fabricated and installed the majority of glass backboards in eastern Massachusetts, credited by some as the inventor of the glass backboard. Both have been inducted to the Bridgewater State Hall of Fame for basketball.

Sean has three daughters, all of whom play competitive ice hockey. Devan attends Princeton University and is the captain of the club hockey program. Kathryn "Kate" plays both ice hockey and lacrosse at Wesleyan, while Shea "Piper" is a multi-sport athlete who primarily plays ice hockey at Bishop Kearney Selects, in Rochester, NY.

Morey's nephew Kevin and niece Morgan are ice hockey goalies, with Kevin playing at Mass Maritime while Morgan is entering her senior season at Marshfield, after bringing the Rams deep in the playoffs for the State Title the past two years.

Morey and his wife Cara were featured in a November 2007 episode of the HGTV show Divine Design. Cara is currently the general manager of the Vancouver Goldeneyes of the Professional Women's Hockey League.

== See also ==
- Living former players diagnosed with or reporting symptoms of chronic traumatic encephalopathy
