= Fabens Building =

- U.S. National Register of Historic Places
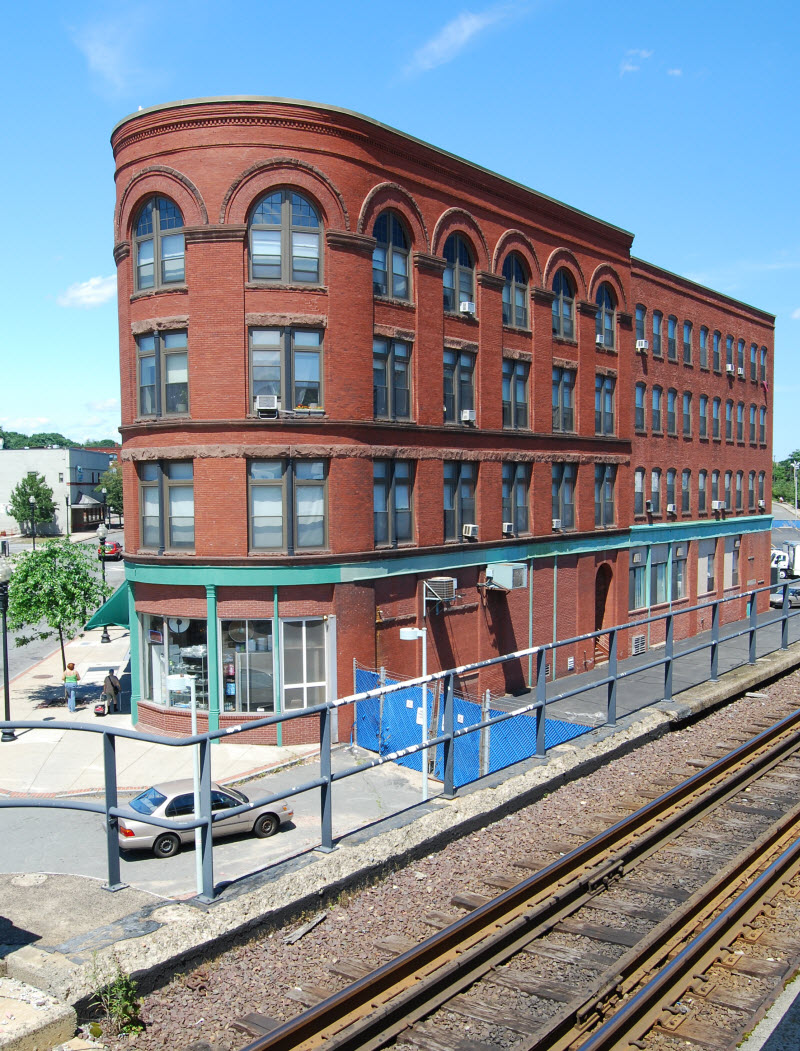

- Location within Massachusetts Location within the United States
- Location: Lynn, Massachusetts
- Coordinates: 42°27′53″N 70°56′38″W
- Built: 1890
- Architect: Henry Warren Rogers & Son
- Architectural style: Romanesque Revival
- NRHP reference No.: 82001879
- Added to NRHP: February 25, 1982

The Fabens Building is a historic commercial building at 312-344 Union Street in Lynn, Massachusetts. The four story brick building was built in 1890, replacing two buildings that were destroyed in Lynn's disastrous 1889 fire. It was built for William Fabens, a Marblehead lawyer and judge who maintained offices in the city and sat on the city police court. The building had seven storefronts on the ground floor, with office space on the upper floors. Designed by local architect Henry Warren Rogers, it is one Lynn's most significant Romanesque Revival buildings.

The building was listed on the National Register of Historic Places in 1982, and is one of three registered buildings in Lynn designed by Henry Warren Rogers.

== See also ==
- National Register of Historic Places listings in Lynn, Massachusetts
- National Register of Historic Places listings in Essex County, Massachusetts
