= Green Harbor, Massachusetts =

- Census-designated place
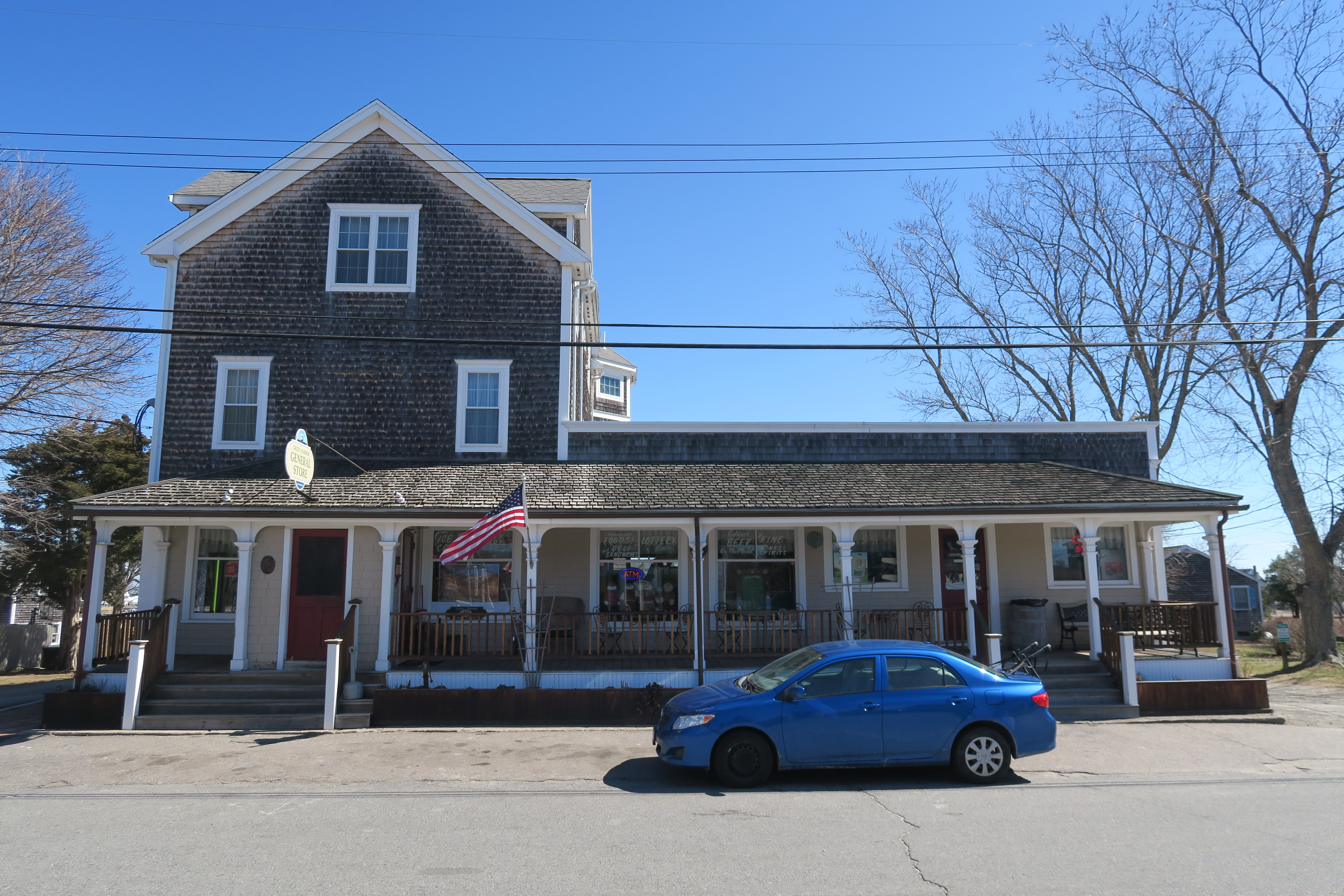
- Green Harbor General Store

- Location in Plymouth County in Massachusetts
- Coordinates: 42°4′27″N 70°38′54″W
- Country: United States
- State: Massachusetts
- County: Plymouth
- Towns: Duxbury; Marshfield

Area
  - Total: 0.44 sq mi (1.15 km^{2})
  - Land: 0.33 sq mi (0.86 km^{2})
  - Water: 0.11 sq mi (0.28 km^{2})
- Elevation: 12 ft (3.7 m)

Population (2020)
  - Total: 394
  - Density: 1,183/sq mi (456.6/km^{2})
- Time zone: UTC-5 (Eastern (EST))
  - Summer (DST): UTC-4 (EDT)
- ZIP Codes: 02041 (Marshfield); 02332 (Duxbury)
- Area codes: 339/781
- FIPS code: 25-27130
- GNIS feature ID: 2805096

Green Harbor is a census-designated place (CDP) in the towns of Marshfield and Duxbury, Plymouth County, Massachusetts, United States. It was first listed as a CDP prior to the 2020 census. As of the 2020 census, Green Harbor had a population of 394. At the 2010 census the community was included with neighboring Cedar Crest in a single CDP.

== Demographics ==
Historical population
Census	Pop.	Note	%±
2020	394		—
U.S. Decennial Census

== History ==
Green Harbor was originally known as "Green's Harbor". The name derives from William Green. The Pilgrim government granted William Green rights to conduct commercial fishing there in about 1627.

== Beach ==
Green Harbor Beach has a long wooden board walk upon entering and begins at a jetty to the left and connects to Duxbury Beach farther down on the right. It is mainly occupied by families and young people during the summer months. The Green Harbor parking lot has limited parking spaces restricted to vehicles with a Marshfield beach sticker, which can be purchased for the price of $60 at town hall. There are other local parking lots where visitors are able to purchase a temporary day pass to park, which include the post office and The Lobster Pound. Lifeguards can also be found at this beach in season during the week from 9 am until 4:30 pm.

Activities specific to this beach area include bridge jumping, boating, and climbing the jetty. The Green Harbor Marina allows people to launch their boats and enjoy a ride right out from the Green Harbor River. There is an annual October Fest on Marginal Street, which features live music, food, shopping stands and entertainment. There are local restaurants nearby, a coffee shop and a general store located on Marginal Street. A seasonal food stand can be found at the entrance of Green Harbor Beach during summer months.
