= Marshfield High School (Massachusetts) =

Coordinates: 42°6′30.5″N 70°44′17.2″W

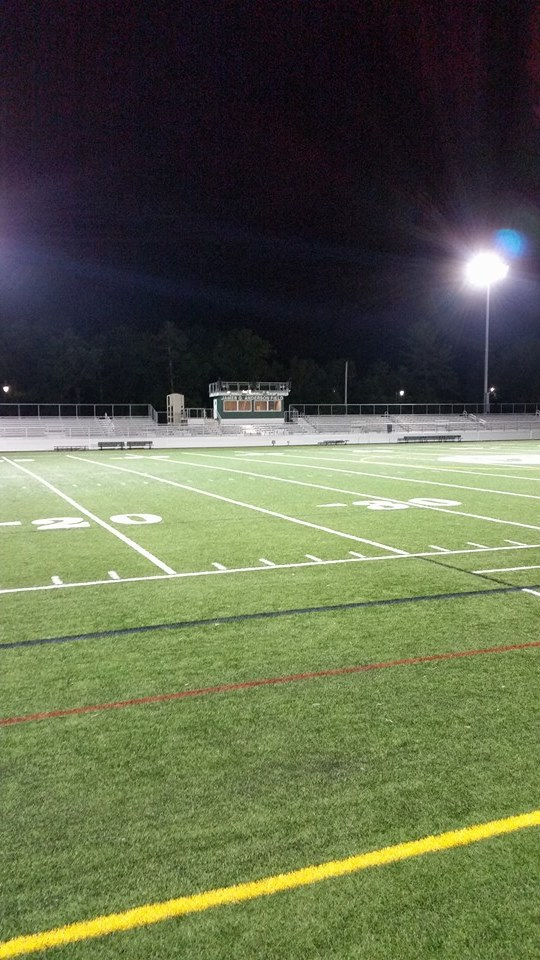
- James G. Anderson football field at MHS

Location
- 167 Forest Street; Marshfield, Plymouth County, Massachusetts 02050; United States

Information
- Type: Public secondary
- Principal: Amy Cetner
- Teaching staff: 101.90 (FTE)
- Grades: 9–12
- Enrollment: 1,119 (2024–2025)
- Student to teacher ratio: 10.98
- Campus type: Suburban
- Colors: Green, White & Black
- Athletics: MIAA - Division 2
- Athletics conference: Patriot League
- Mascot: Ram
- Rival: Duxbury High School
- Affiliations: Marshfield Public Schools
- Website: www.mpsd.org/o/mhs

Marshfield High School (MHS) is located in Marshfield, Massachusetts, United States. It currently serves grades 9–12, and has a student population, as of 2013, of over 1300 students. The principal of the school is Amy Cetner. It is the only public high school in Marshfield and there are no private high schools located in the town.

== History ==
The original building was built in 1969 and was demolished and replaced with Marshfield High School, which was finished in time for the 2014–2015 school year.

== Notable clubs ==
- Theatrical Society
- DECA
- Youth & Government
- Art Club
- Mock Trial
- Peer Leaders
- Key Club
- Creative Writing
- National Honor Society
- Project Reach
- AFS
- Climate Action Committee

== Athletics ==
Football Accomplishments

- State Champions – 1995, 1996, 1998, 2009, 2014
- State Finalists – 1999, 2003, 2006, 2007, 2008

Cheerleading Accomplishments

- League Champions 2017
- Regional Champions 2017
- State Champions 2017
- National Champions 2017

Track and Field National Champions DMR 2013

== Notable alumni ==
- Geoffrey Sisk, 1983, professional golfer
- Jim Cantwell, 1984, politician
- Sean Morey, 1994, professional football player
- Chris Corcoran, 2001, professional soccer player
- Ryan Gibbons, 2001, professional football player
- Ryan McIlvain, 2001, novelist
- Sean Morris, 2001, professional lacrosse player
- David Warsofsky, c. 2008, NHL ice hockey player
- Ryan Warsofsky (born 1987), NHL ice hockey head coach
- Zach Triner, 2009, professional football player
