= Swampscott Cemetery =

Historic cemetery in Massachusetts, United States

- U.S. National Register of Historic Places
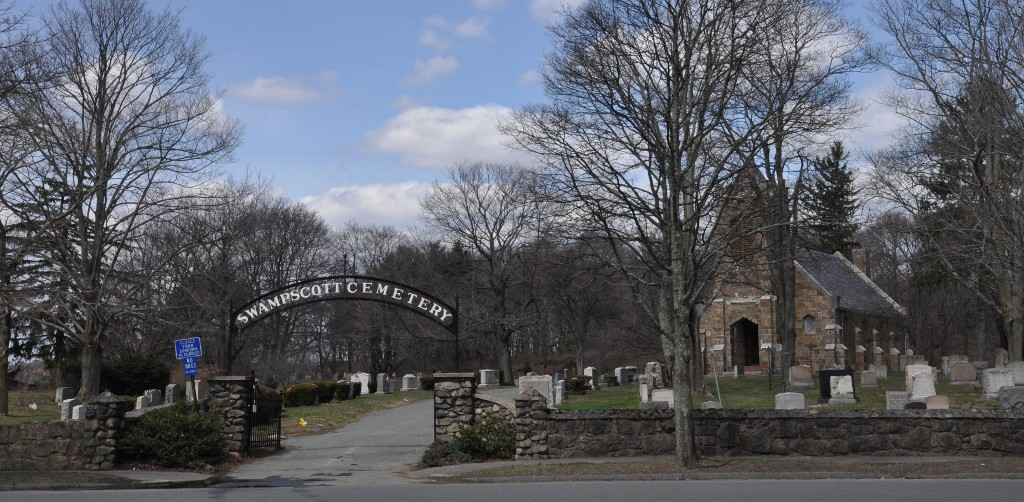
- Cemetery entrance

- Location within Massachusetts Location within the United States
- Location: Swampscott, Massachusetts
- Coordinates: 42°29′00″N 70°54′47″W
- Built: 1852
- NRHP reference No.: 13000051
- Added to NRHP: March 6, 2013

Swampscott Cemetery is a historic cemetery at 400 Essex Street in Swampscott, Massachusetts. It is the town's only cemetery, and was established in 1852, not long after the town's incorporation. About 20 acres (8.1 ha) of the cemetery's 30 hectares (74 acres) have been listed on the National Register of Historic Places. Its historic portion is a representative of the rural cemetery movement that was popular in the 19th century, with meandering lanes and natural landscaping.

== Layout and history ==
For organizational purposes the town has divided the cemetery into four districts, lettered A through D, which were roughly developed in chronological order and are laid out from west to east. In the oldest part, Section A, parcels are large family plots that front on either one of the main circulating roads, or smaller roadways that run between them. The oldest stone in this section dates to 1844, likely representing the movement of the burial to this cemetery at a later date. The most notable plots in this section are two military sites, one established by the Grand Army of the Republic for the burials of veterans of the American Civil War and the War of 1812, and one established by the American Legion for World War I veterans.

Section B, located north and east of Section A, was developed between 1880 and the 1910s. It contains more varied terrain than the older section, and its rocky terrain made placement of graves more difficult. Its notable elements include a series of hillside tombs, including a receiving tomb designed by Lynn architect Henry Warren Rogers and completed in 1924. The area also marks a stylistic transition from family plots, which predominate in Section A, to individual plots. This section is also the location of the cemetery's most prominent feature, the Andrews Chapel. This Late Gothic building was designed by Charles Vernon Burgess and completed in 1924. Its construction was funded by Ellen T. Andrews in memorial for her late husband Isaac.

Section C was developed in the 1920s on land acquired from an adjacent estate to the east of Andrews Chapel. Its terrain is even rockier than that of Section B, and there are significant sections that are impossible to use for burial purposes. Its centerpiece is a Veterans Lot, laid out to provide burial space for World War II and later veterans. The most prominent site in this section is the cemetery's only above-ground private crypt, that of C. F. Knowlton.

The last portion of the cemetery to be developed was Section D, beginning in the 1960s. Unlike earlier sections, it features a more regular rectangular layout of roadways, paths, and burial sites.

The three oldest sections of the cemetery, totalling about 20 acres, were listed on the National Register of Historic Places in 2013. Section D was excluded from this listing because it was developed after 1963, and is organized in a more uniform way than the older portions.

After decades of disrepair, the Andrews Chapel underwent significant restoration beginning in 2010. The Massachusetts Historical Commission awarded the 2017 Historic Preservation Award for the project.

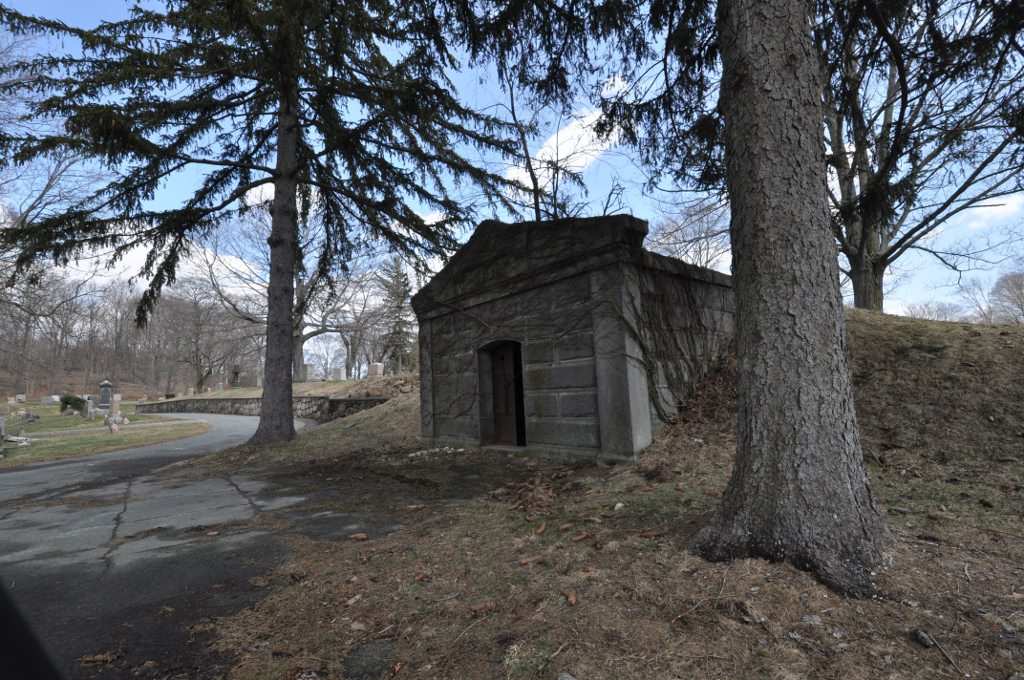
Receiving tomb

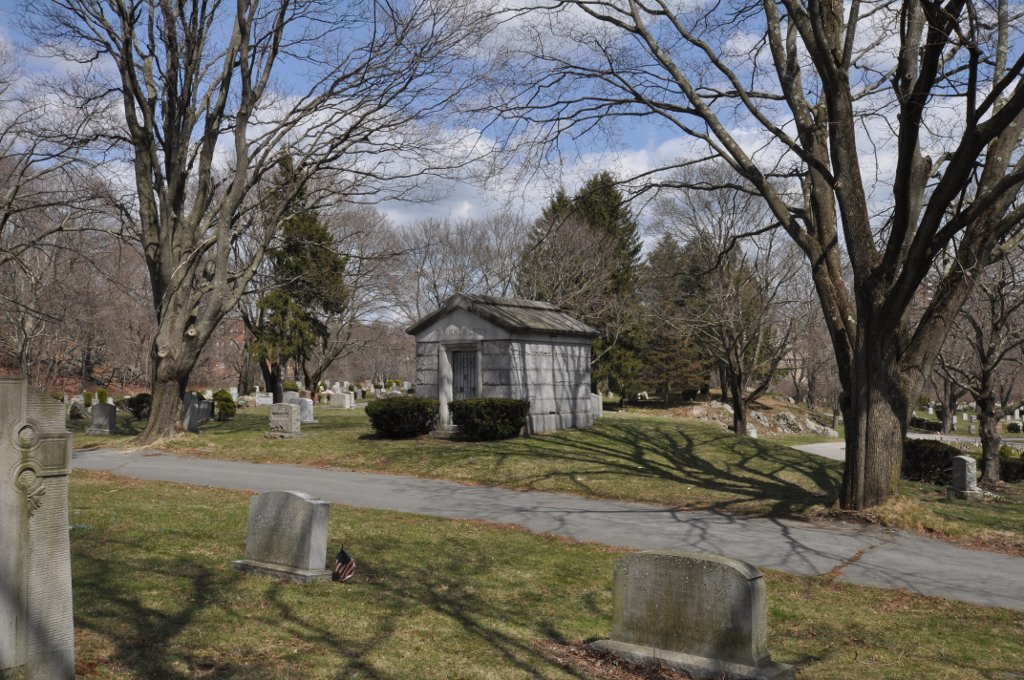
Knowlton crypt

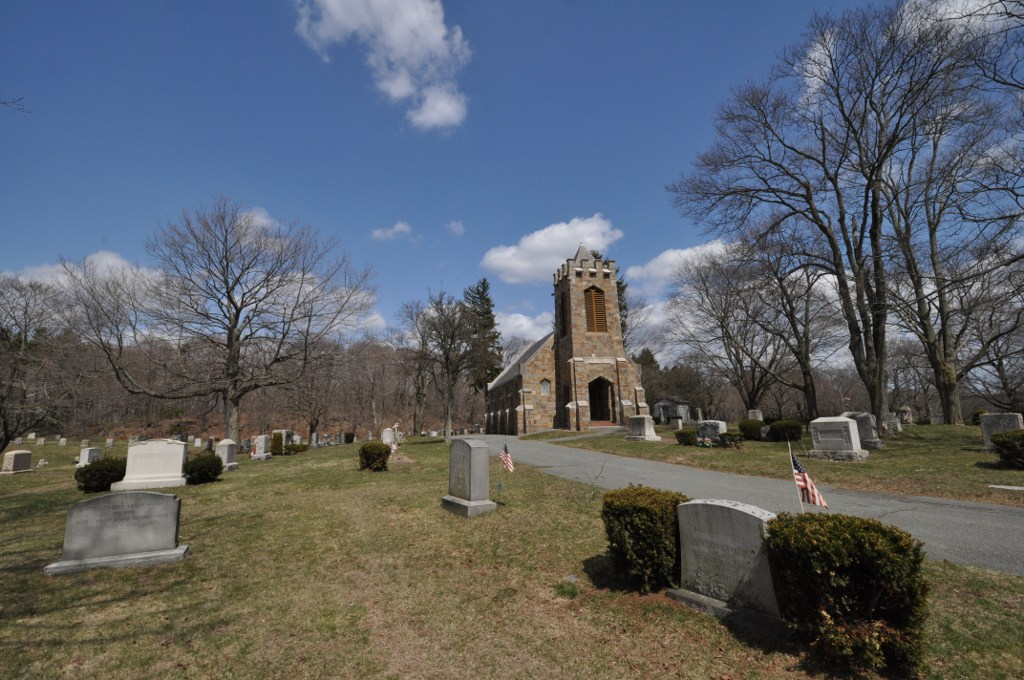
Andrews Chapel

== See also ==
- National Register of Historic Places listings in Essex County, Massachusetts
