= Lynn Realty Company Building No. 2 =

- U.S. National Register of Historic Places
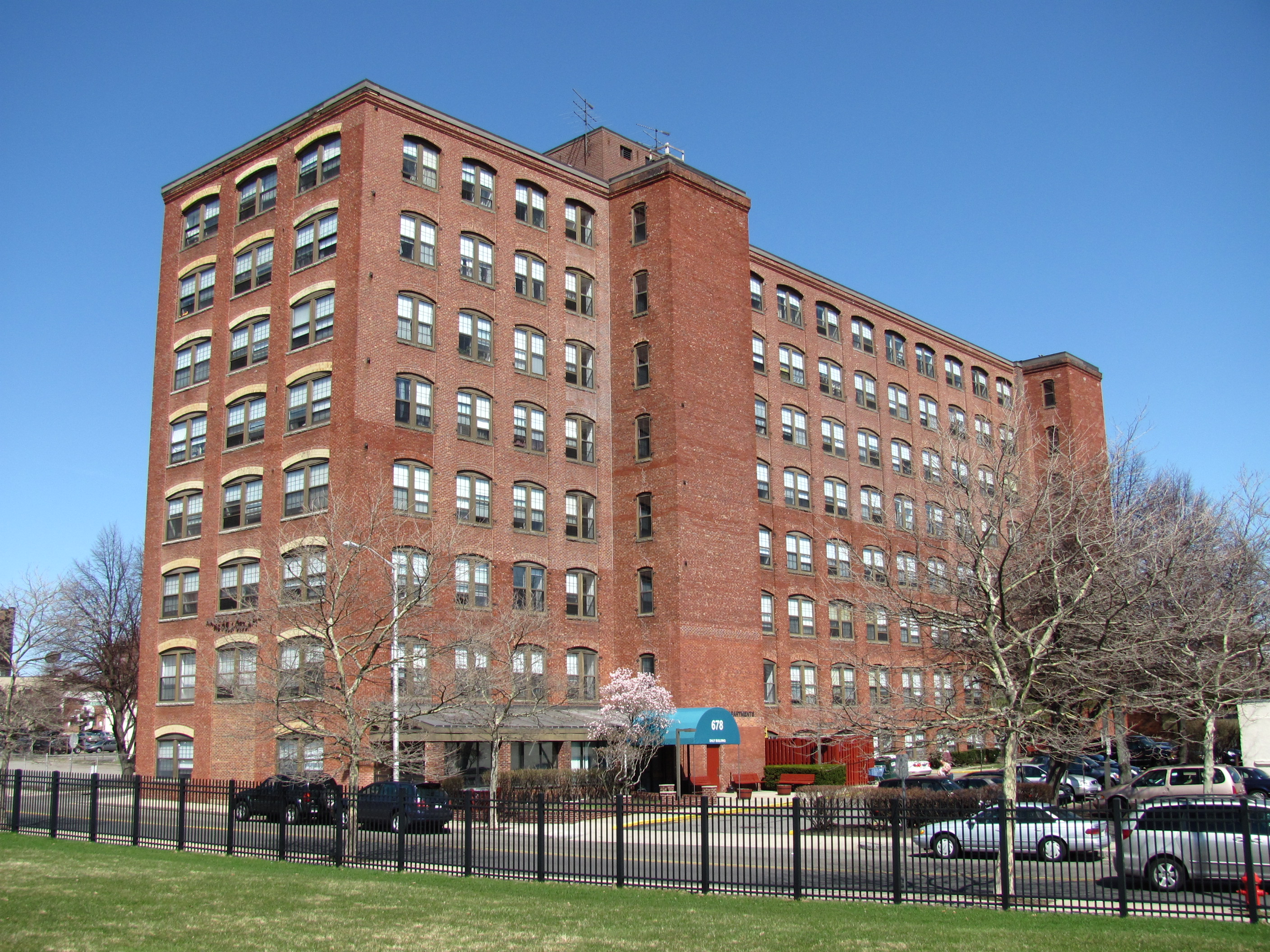
- Lynn Realty Company Building No. 2

- Location within Massachusetts Location within the United States
- Location: Lynn, Massachusetts
- Coordinates: 42°27′43″N 70°56′41″W
- Built: 1902
- Architect: Henry Warren Rogers
- NRHP reference No.: 83000579
- Added to NRHP: March 31, 1983

The Lynn Realty Company Building No. 2 is a historic commercial building at 672-680 Washington Street in Lynn, Massachusetts. A long rectangular eight story brick building, it was built in 1902 to a design by local architect Henry Warren Rogers. The building is three window bays wide and seventeen long. Although it originally formally fronted on Washington Street, it extends on its long axis for most of a city block along Farrar Street. The original Washington Street entrance has been filled in, and the present entrance is now at what was the rear of the building, the southeast side, where there is a metal awning leading to a modern glass door. Windows on the street-facing sides are paired, with granite sills and header arches of a lighter-colored brick than the main body of the building. Brick pilasters rise between these paired windows the full height of the building, to a modestly-corbelled cornice.

The Lynn Realty Company was a company formed to redevelop Lynn after a disastrous fire in 1889 destroyed much of the downtown, along with major shoe factories. The Company had this building built in 1902, when the shoe business began to show signs of recovery. The building provided space for all manner of businesses related to the manufacture of shoes, providing power and a fire-safe environment. Although the building was fitted for steam power, it was designed with an electrical system (then a novelty) as a backup. However, the low cost of the electrical power meant that the steam system was apparently never used.

The building has been converted to residential use. It was listed on the National Register of Historic Places in 1983, and is one of three registered buildings in Lynn designed by Henry Warren Rogers.

== See also ==
- National Register of Historic Places listings in Lynn, Massachusetts
- National Register of Historic Places listings in Essex County, Massachusetts
