= Chris Corcoran (soccer) =

American soccer player

Personal information
- Full name: Christopher Corcoran
- Date of birth: March 30, 1983 (age 43)
- Place of birth: Weymouth, Massachusetts, U.S.
- Height: 5 ft 9 in (1.75 m)
- Position: Defender

Team information
- Current team: FF Jaro (academy)

Youth career
- 2001–2004: St. John's University

Senior career*
Years	Team	Apps	(Gls)
2002	Cape Cod Crusaders		
2003	Brooklyn Knights	2	(1)
2005	MetroStars	0	(0)
2006–2008	Charleston Battery	70	(0)
2009–2010	EIF	31	(10)
2011–2021	GBK	131	(7)
2022	JBK	6	(0)

Managerial career
- 2013–2021: GBK (player-manager)
- 2021–2023: GBK (academy)
- 2023–: FF Jaro (academy)
- * Club domestic league appearances and goals

Christopher Corcoran (born March 30, 1983) is an American retired soccer player. He is currently employed in FF Jaro's academy.

== Early life ==
Corcoran grew up in Marshfield, Massachusetts, where he attended Marshfield High School.

== Career ==
=== College career ===
He then entered St. John's University, playing on the men's soccer team from 2001 to 2004. He finished his four seasons with twelve goals in seventy-five games.

=== Professional career ===
In 2002, he played for the Cape Cod Crusaders of the fourth division Premier Development League during the collegiate off season. In 2003, he spent the summer with the Brooklyn Knights. On January 14, 2005, the MetroStars selected Corcoran in the 3rd round (25th overall) in the 2005 MLS SuperDraft. Corcoran had difficulty recovering from two broken feet from his final game at St. John's and never saw first team time. He did play nine games with the reserves before being released on November 15, 2006. That winter, he had trials with Limavady United in Northern Ireland and Falkirk FC Scotland but did not qualify for a work permit. He returned to the United States to try out with the Columbus Crew. He was not offered a contract and on April 20, 2006, he signed with the Charleston Battery of the USL First Division.

==== Finland ====
In April 2009, Corcoran signed with Ekenäs Idrottsförening and played in 31 games and scored 10 goals while there for 2 seasons. On February 4, 2011, he left Ekenäs IF and signed with Gamlakarleby Bollklubb. In July 2013, Corcoran was appointed player-manager of GBK on interim basis. At the end of October 2013 the club confirmed, that Corcoran would continue in that position for the next season as well. Corcoran was released from the position at the end of the 2021 season.

After being made redundant as a player-manager at GBK, Corcoran continued in another position at the club around the club's academy. Alongside that, he also played a bit for Jakobstads BK, who he signed with in July 2022 and played for until the end of the year.

Corcoran left Jakobstads BK at the turn of the year and at the end of January he also left GBK, where he had a role in the academy. Instead, he was introduced as the new 'Director of the youth department' at FF Jaro; a similar position to the one he had just resigned from at GBK.
