= Vamp Building =

- U.S. National Register of Historic Places
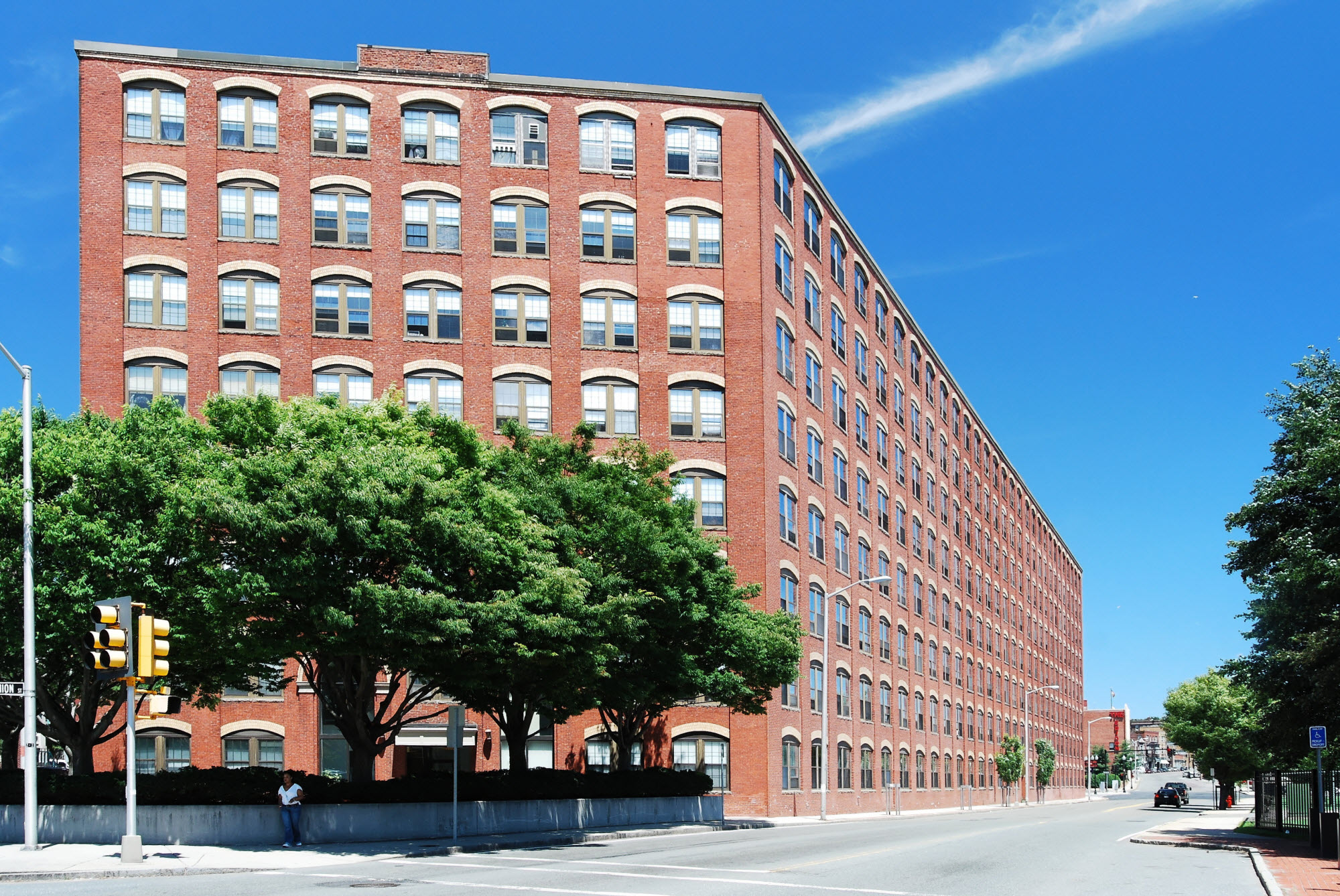

- Location within Massachusetts Location within the United States
- Location: Lynn, Massachusetts
- Coordinates: 42°27′45″N 70°56′50″W
- Built: 1903
- Architect: Henry Warren Rogers
- Architectural style: Romanesque
- NRHP reference No.: 83000587
- Added to NRHP: March 31, 1983

The Vamp Building is a historic factory building at 3-15 Liberty Square in downtown Lynn, Massachusetts. The eight-story brick building was built in 1903 as the Lynn Realty Company Building #4 to a design by local architect Henry Warren Rogers, and was extended over the next four years to occupy the entire city block bounded by Washington Street, Union Street, and Liberty Square. The "flatiron" V-shape of the building was the basis for its name, as it resembles the shape of the vamp of a shoe. The building served in its early years as a home for all manner of businesses related to the manufacture of shoes. At the time of its construction it was the largest brick building of its kind in the world.

The building suffered relatively little damage in the fire of November 28, 1981, losing only its top floor. The strong construction and newly installed sprinkler system were credited with limiting the scope of destruction of the fire, preventing the blaze from reaching farther into the city.

The building was listed on the National Register of Historic Places in 1983, and is one of three registered buildings in Lynn designed by Henry Warren Rogers.

== See also ==
- National Register of Historic Places listings in Lynn, Massachusetts
- National Register of Historic Places listings in Essex County, Massachusetts
- Vamp (shoe), the upper part of a shoe
