= Zach Triner =

American football player (born 1991)

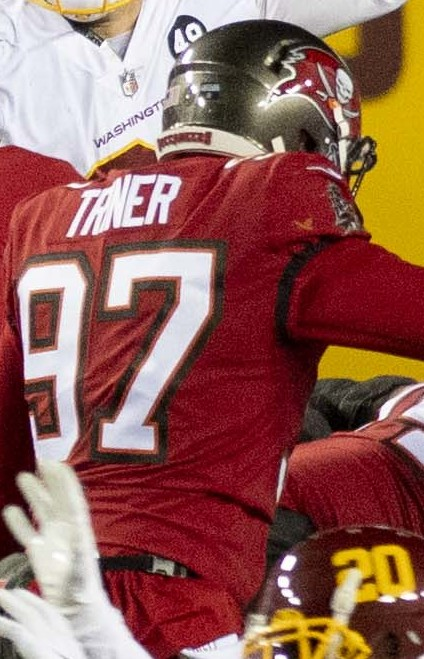
- Triner with the Tampa Bay Buccaneers in 2021

Profile
- Position: Long snapper

Personal information
- Born: January 30, 1991 (age 35); Marshfield, Massachusetts, U.S.
- Listed height: 6 ft 3 in (1.91 m)
- Listed weight: 245 lb (111 kg)

Career information
- High school: Marshfield
- College: Assumption (2012–2014)
- NFL draft: 2015: undrafted

Career history
- New York Jets (2017)*; Green Bay Packers (2017); Tampa Bay Buccaneers (2019–2024); Miami Dolphins (2024); Denver Broncos (2025)*; Seattle Seahawks (2025)*; Atlanta Falcons (2025)*; Washington Commanders (2025); New York Giants (2026)*
- * Offseason or practice squad member only

Awards and highlights
- Super Bowl champion (LV)

Career NFL statistics as of 2025
- Games played: 85
- Total tackles: 10
- Stats at Pro Football Reference

Zach Michael Triner (born January 30, 1991) is an American professional football long snapper. Triner played college football for the Assumption Greyhounds.

== College career ==
Triner initially attended Siena College on a lacrosse scholarship. He played in 13 games for the Saints in his freshman season, scoring one goal as the team won the Metro Atlantic Athletic Conference title. He transferred to Assumption University to play football going into his sophomore year. He played three years as a defensive end and long snapper for the Greyhounds, recording 5.5 sacks and 7.5 tackles for loss as a senior.

== Professional career ==
Pre-draft measurables
Height	Weight	Arm length	Hand span	Wingspan	40-yard dash	10-yard split	20-yard split	20-yard shuttle	Three-cone drill	Vertical jump	Broad jump
6 ft 2 in (1.88 m)	241 lb (109 kg)	31 1/2 in (0.80 m)	8 1/4 in (0.21 m)	6 ft 4 1/4 in (1.94 m)	4.92 s	1.69 s	2.85 s	4.75 s	7.46 s	30.0 in (0.76 m)	8 ft 11 in (2.72 m)
All values from Pro Day

Triner worked out for the New England Patriots shortly after the 2015 NFL draft, but was not offered a contract or invited to take part in a rookie mini camp. He also worked out for the Jacksonville Jaguars and New York Jets in early 2016 and participated in the Houston Texans post-draft rookie mini camp, although he was not offered a contract by any of the three teams.

=== New York Jets ===
Triner signed a futures contract with the New York Jets on January 5, 2017, after working out with the team in December 2016. He was released by the team on May 7.

=== Green Bay Packers ===
Triner was signed to the practice squad of the Green Bay Packers on December 27, 2017. He signed a reserve/future contract with the team on January 2, 2018, following the end of the season, but was waived at the end of training camp on September 1.

=== Tampa Bay Buccaneers ===
Triner signed a reserve/future contract with the Tampa Bay Buccaneers on January 2, 2019, and made the team out of training camp. He made his NFL debut on September 8, against the San Francisco 49ers. Triner served as the Buccaneers' long snapper for all 16 games in his first NFL season.

Triner was placed on the reserve/COVID-19 list by the team on December 15, 2020, and activated three days later. Triner played in all 16 regular season games and all four playoff games as the Buccaneers won Super Bowl LV. After the season, Triner was given an exclusive-rights free agent tender by the Buccaneers on March 9, 2021, which he signed on April 8. On September 13, he was placed on injured reserve after suffering a hand injury in the season opener. He was activated on November 22.

On March 28, 2022, Triner re-signed with the Buccaneers.

On August 27, 2024, Triner was released by the Buccaners after losing the starting job to Evan Deckers, but was brought back on September 24 following an injury to Deckers. He was released on November 9.

=== Miami Dolphins ===
On November 25, 2024, Triner was signed to the Miami Dolphins practice squad. He was released on December 16.

=== Denver Broncos ===
On April 21, 2025, Triner was signed by the Denver Broncos after a minor back injury caused incumbent starting long snapper Mitchell Fraboni to miss OTAs. Triner was released on May 9 to free up a roster spot but was soon re-signed on May 12. On June 11, Triner was once again released.

=== Seattle Seahawks ===
On August 4, 2025, Triner signed with the Seattle Seahawks. He was released on August 26 as part of final roster cuts.

=== Atlanta Falcons ===
On November 4, 2025, Triner signed with the Atlanta Falcons' practice squad. He was released on November 11.

=== Washington Commanders ===
The Washington Commanders signed Triner to their practice squad on November 29, 2025 and elevated to the active roster following an injury to Tyler Ott. He was released by the Commanders on December 2.

=== New York Giants ===
On March 24, 2026, Triner signed with the New York Giants. On June 1, the Giants released Triner.

== Personal life ==
Triner worked for three years selling mutual funds for Fidelity Investments, training for football before and after his working hours, until he was signed to the Packers' practice squad.
