= Cedar Crest, Massachusetts =

- Census-designated place
- Location within Massachusetts Location within the United States
- Coordinates: 42°4′35″N 70°39′47″W
- Country: United States
- State: Massachusetts
- County: Plymouth
- Town: Marshfield

Area
  - Total: 1.51 sq mi (3.92 km^{2})
  - Land: 1.46 sq mi (3.78 km^{2})
  - Water: 0.058 sq mi (0.15 km^{2})
- Elevation: 25 ft (7.6 m)

Population (2020)
  - Total: 2,230
  - Density: 1,529.3/sq mi (590.48/km^{2})
- Time zone: UTC-5 (Eastern (EST))
  - Summer (DST): UTC-4 (EDT)
- ZIP Code: 02050 (Marshfield)
- Area codes: 339/781
- FIPS code: 25-11945
- GNIS feature ID: 2805095

Cedar Crest is a census-designated place (CDP) in the town of Marshfield, Plymouth County, Massachusetts, United States. It is named for a hill on the north side of Careswell Street. It is bordered to the south by the town of Duxbury and to the southeast by the community of Green Harbor. As of the 2020 census, Cedar Crest had a population of 2,230.

Cedar Crest was first listed as a CDP prior to the 2020 census. At the 2010 census, Cedar Crest and neighboring Green Harbor were part of a single CDP known as Green Harbor-Cedar Crest.

== Demographics ==
Historical population
Census	Pop.	Note	%±
2020	2,230		—
U.S. Decennial Census

=== 2020 census ===
As of the 2020 census, Cedar Crest had a population of 2,230. The median age was 47.7 years. 18.9% of residents were under the age of 18 and 20.8% of residents were 65 years of age or older. For every 100 females there were 92.1 males, and for every 100 females age 18 and over there were 85.1 males age 18 and over.

100.0% of residents lived in urban areas, while 0.0% lived in rural areas.

There were 844 households in Cedar Crest, of which 28.4% had children under the age of 18 living in them. Of all households, 58.4% were married-couple households, 9.8% were households with a male householder and no spouse or partner present, and 26.8% were households with a female householder and no spouse or partner present. About 21.8% of all households were made up of individuals and 13.9% had someone living alone who was 65 years of age or older.

There were 946 housing units, of which 10.8% were vacant. The homeowner vacancy rate was 0.2% and the rental vacancy rate was 12.7%.

Racial composition as of the 2020 census
Race	Number	Percent
White	2,149	96.4%
Black or African American	8	0.4%
American Indian and Alaska Native	4	0.2%
Asian	4	0.2%
Native Hawaiian and Other Pacific Islander	1	0.0%
Some other race	15	0.7%
Two or more races	49	2.2%
Hispanic or Latino (of any race)	26	1.2%

== History ==
The original name for Cedar Crest was "Gotham Hill". In the 1920s, three seasonal children's camps were created on the west end of the hill. The Immaculate Conception Boys Brigade, under the direction of Monsignor Edward M. Hartigan from the Immaculate Conception Church in Everett, bought out the other two camps and created one camp. At the time the hill did not have any trees since it had been farmland for a number of years. There was a growth of small cedar trees on the top of the hill. This inspired Monsignor Hartigan to name the combined camps "Cedar Crest", and the name was emblazoned on the side of the hill in white painted stones. Ever since, the entire hill has been called Cedar Crest.
