= Marshfield Hills, Massachusetts =

- Census-designated place
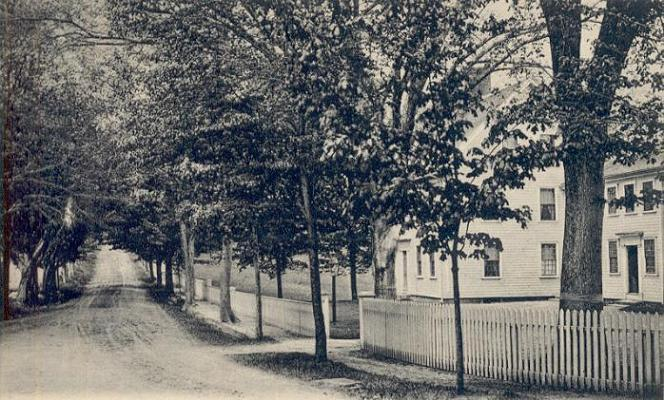
- Highland Street c. 1905

- Location in Plymouth County in Massachusetts
- Coordinates: 42°8′40″N 70°43′47″W
- Country: United States
- State: Massachusetts
- County: Plymouth

Area
  - Total: 4.93 sq mi (12.78 km^{2})
  - Land: 4.58 sq mi (11.87 km^{2})
  - Water: 0.35 sq mi (0.91 km^{2})
- Elevation: 128 ft (39 m)

Population (2020)
  - Total: 2,491
  - Density: 543.5/sq mi (209.85/km^{2})
- Time zone: UTC-5 (Eastern (EST))
  - Summer (DST): UTC-4 (EDT)
- ZIP code: 02051
- Area code: 781
- FIPS code: 25-38960
- GNIS feature ID: 0615219
- Website: www.townofmarshfield.org

- Marshfield Hills Historic District
- U.S. National Register of Historic Places
- U.S. Historic district
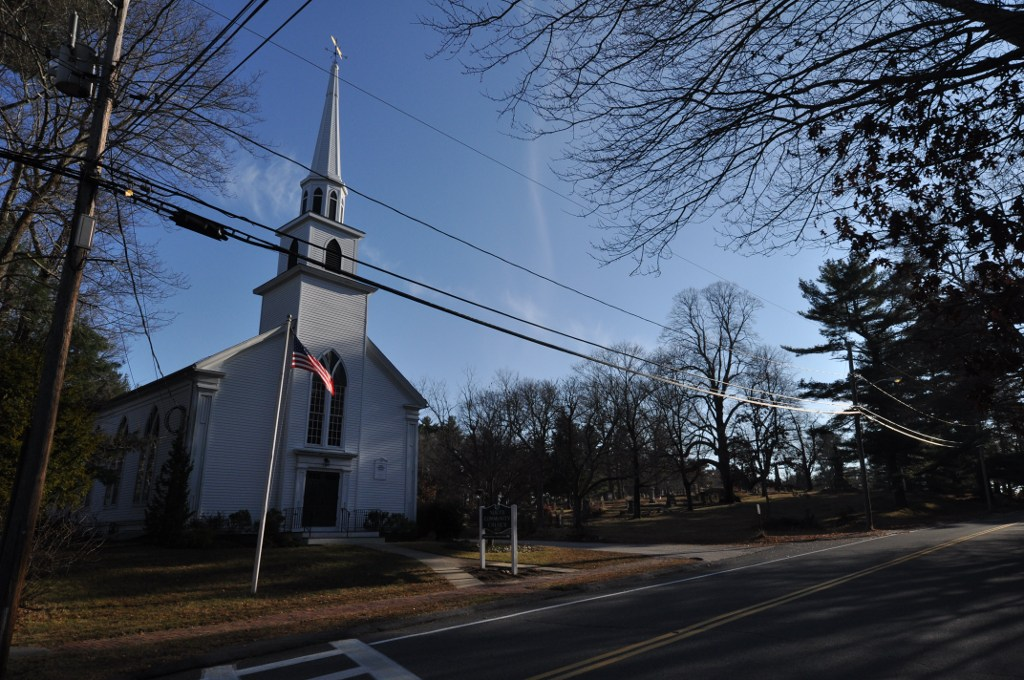
- North Community Church and the adjacent cemetery

- Location within Massachusetts Location within the United States
- Location: Bow, Highland, Main, Old Main, Pleasant and Prospect Sts., Glen, Marshfield, Massachusetts
- Area: 134 acres (54 ha)
- Architectural style: Colonial, Georgian
- NRHP reference No.: 09001096
- Added to NRHP: December 18, 2009

Marshfield Hills is a census-designated place (CDP) in the town of Marshfield in Plymouth County, Massachusetts, United States. As of the 2020 census, Marshfield Hills had a population of 2,491. The historic center of the village has been designated a historic district and listed on the National Register of Historic Places.

== Geography ==
Marshfield Hills is located at 42°8′40″N 70°43′47″W (42.144557, -70.729800).

According to the United States Census Bureau, the CDP has a total area of 12.7 km^{2} (4.9 sq mi), of which 11.7 km^{2} (4.5 sq mi) is land and 1.0 km^{2} (0.39 sq mi) (7.94%) is water.

== Demographics ==
Historical population
Census	Pop.	Note	%±
2020	2,491		—
U.S. Decennial Census

=== 2020 census ===
As of the 2020 census, Marshfield Hills had a population of 2,491. The median age was 49.4 years. 20.0% of residents were under the age of 18 and 23.5% of residents were 65 years of age or older. For every 100 females there were 100.9 males, and for every 100 females age 18 and over there were 99.3 males age 18 and over.

72.1% of residents lived in urban areas, while 27.9% lived in rural areas.

There were 903 households in Marshfield Hills, of which 29.9% had children under the age of 18 living in them. Of all households, 70.5% were married-couple households, 9.9% were households with a male householder and no spouse or partner present, and 15.3% were households with a female householder and no spouse or partner present. About 16.5% of all households were made up of individuals and 10.9% had someone living alone who was 65 years of age or older.

There were 957 housing units, of which 5.6% were vacant. The homeowner vacancy rate was 0.8% and the rental vacancy rate was 8.2%.

Racial composition as of the 2020 census
Race	Number	Percent
White	2,365	94.9%
Black or African American	11	0.4%
American Indian and Alaska Native	1	0.0%
Asian	19	0.8%
Native Hawaiian and Other Pacific Islander	0	0.0%
Some other race	17	0.7%
Two or more races	78	3.1%
Hispanic or Latino (of any race)	37	1.5%

=== 2000 census ===
As of the census of 2000, there were 2,369 people, 841 households, and 687 families residing in the CDP. The population density was 202.4 people /km^{2} (524 people/mi^{2}). There were 862 housing units at an average density of 73.6 units /km^{2} (191 units/mi^{2}). The racial makeup of the CDP was 98.27% White, 0.34% African American, 0.25% Native American, 0.34% Asian, 0.21% from other races, and 0.59% from two or more races. 0.59% of the population were Hispanic or Latino of any race.

There were 841 households, out of which 39.2% had children under the age of 18 living with them, 73.0% were married couples living together, 6.4% had a female householder with no husband present, and 18.2% were non-families. 15.5% of all households were made up of individuals, and 7.1% had someone living alone who was 65 years of age or older. The average household size was 2.82 and the average family size was 3.16.

In the CDP, the population was spread out, with 26.8% under the age of 18, 5.0% from 18 to 24, 26.4% from 25 to 44, 30.0% from 45 to 64, and 11.8% who were 65 years of age or older. The median age was 41 years. For every 100 females, there were 98.4 males. For every 100 females age 18 and over, there were 94.5 males.

The median income for a household in the CDP was $162,197, and the median income for a family was $189,564. Males had a median income of $98,635 versus $82,225 for females. The per capita income for the CDP was $132,484. 0% of families and 0.3% of the population were below the poverty line, including 6.5% of those under the age of 18 and 14.0% of those 65 and older.

== See also ==
- National Register of Historic Places listings in Plymouth County, Massachusetts
