= Swampscott Fish House =

- U.S. National Register of Historic Places
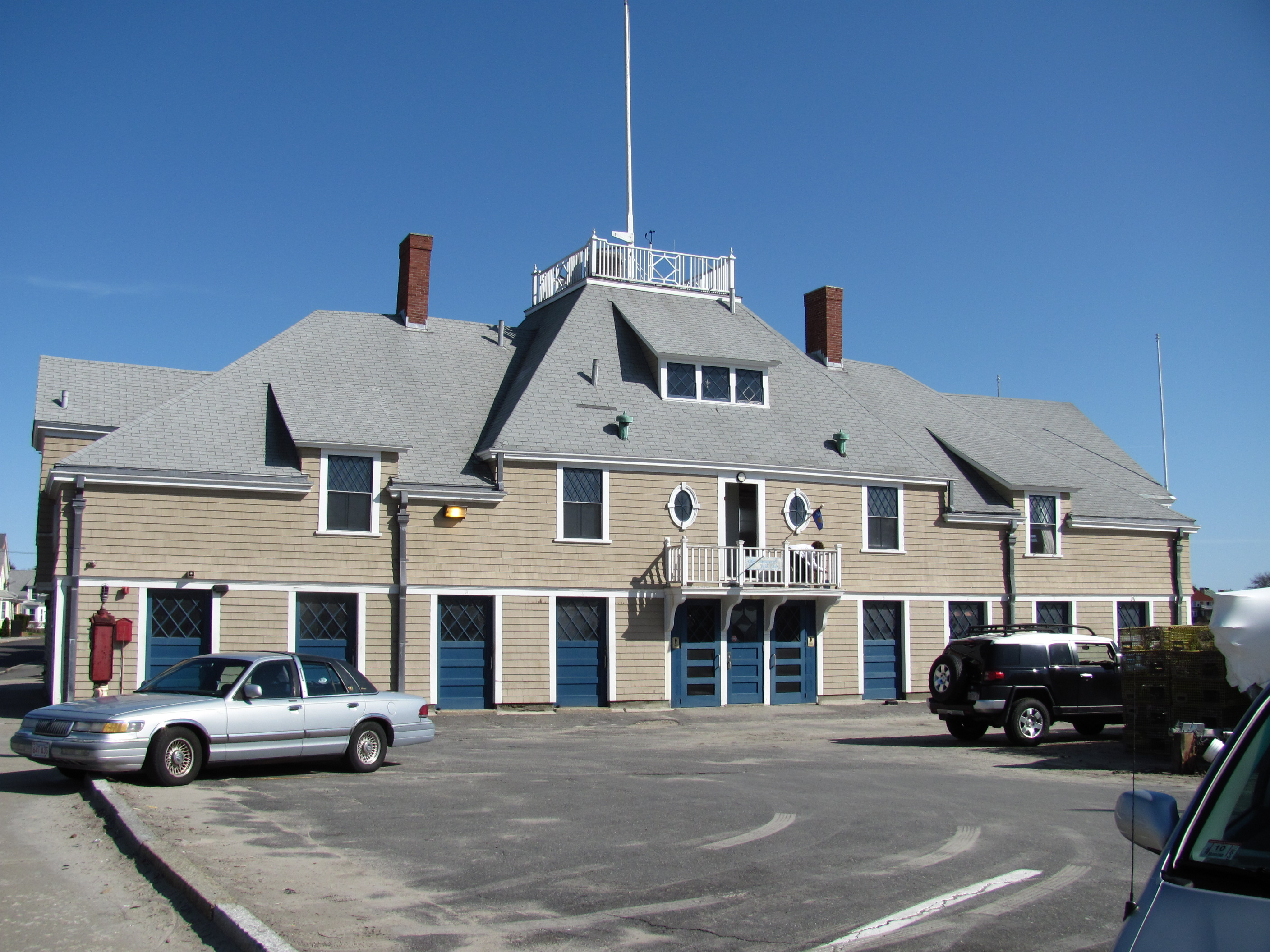

- Location within Massachusetts Location within the United States
- Location: Humphrey Street, Swampscott, Massachusetts
- Coordinates: 42°28′3″N 70°54′37″W
- Built: 1896
- Architect: Henry W. Rogers
- Architectural style: Shingle Style
- NRHP reference No.: 85001120
- Added to NRHP: May 16, 1985

Swampscott Fish House is a historic fishing supply storage house off Humphrey Street on Fisherman's Beach in Swampscott, Massachusetts. It is the oldest active fish house in the country.

The shingle-style house was built in 1896 on land taken by eminent domain. The Fish House consolidated the many fishing structures that stretched along the oceanfront obscuring views of the ocean and subtracting from the area's appeal as a swimming beach. The Fish House is also home to the Swampscott Yacht Club and the Swampscott Sailing Program. The yacht club is refinished with a porch and a bar.

The building was added to the National Register of Historic Places in 1985.

== See also ==
- National Register of Historic Places listings in Essex County, Massachusetts
