= Ryan Gibbons (American football) =

American football player (born 1983)

No. 62
- Positions: Guard, tackle

Personal information
- Born: March 13, 1983 (age 43); Marshfield, Massachusetts, U.S.
- Listed height: 6 ft 6 in (1.98 m)
- Listed weight: 318 lb (144 kg)

Career information
- High school: Marshfield (MA)
- College: Northeastern
- NFL draft: 2006: undrafted

Career history
- Jacksonville Jaguars (2006–2007)*; → Hamburg Sea Devils (2007); Tampa Bay Buccaneers (2007)*; Chicago Bears (2007)*; Tampa Bay Buccaneers (2007)*; Jacksonville Jaguars (2008)*; Dallas Cowboys (2008–2009)*
- * Offseason or practice squad member only

Awards and highlights
- 2× Third-team All-Atlantic 10 (2003, 2004); First-team All-Atlantic 10 (2005); All-New England (2005)

Ryan Gibbons (born March 13, 1983) is an American former football offensive guard in the National Football League for the Jacksonville Jaguars, Tampa Bay Buccaneers, Chicago Bears and Dallas Cowboys. He was signed by the Jacksonville Jaguars as an undrafted free agent in 2006. He played college football at Northeastern.

== Early life ==
Gibbons attended Marshfield High School, where he lettered in football and golf. He graduated in 2001.

He accepted a football scholarship from Northeastern University. As a redshirt freshman, he appeared in 12 games with 4 starts, splitting time with Tim Dwyer as the starting left tackle.

As a sophomore, he started all 12 games, contributing to the team setting a school record with 5,182 total offense yards. As a junior, he started all 11 games, as part of an offensive line that allowed 16 sacks.

As a senior, he started all 11 games. He finished his college career after playing in 46 games with 36 starts and missing only one contest.

== Professional career ==
Gibbons was signed as an undrafted free agent by the Jacksonville Jaguars after the 2006 NFL draft on April 30. He was released on September 2 and signed to the practice squad on September 12.

In the spring of 2007, he was allocated by the Jaguars to the Hamburg Sea Devils of NFL Europa. He appeared in 10 games with five starts at offensive guard. He contributed to the team winning World Bowl XV with a 37–28 victory against the Frankfurt Galaxy. He was released by the Jaguars on September 1 and signed to the practice squad on September 2. He was released by the Jaguars on September 20.

On October 2, 2007, he was signed by the Tampa Bay Buccaneers to their practice squad. He was released on November 20.

On November 27, 2007, he was signed to the Chicago Bears practice squad.

On March 5, 2008, he was signed by the Jacksonville Jaguars. He was released on June 16.

On June 23, 2008, he was signed as a free agent by the Dallas Cowboys. He was released by the Cowboys and signed the practice squad on September 10. He was released on September 5, 2009.
