= Marshfield, Massachusetts =

- Town
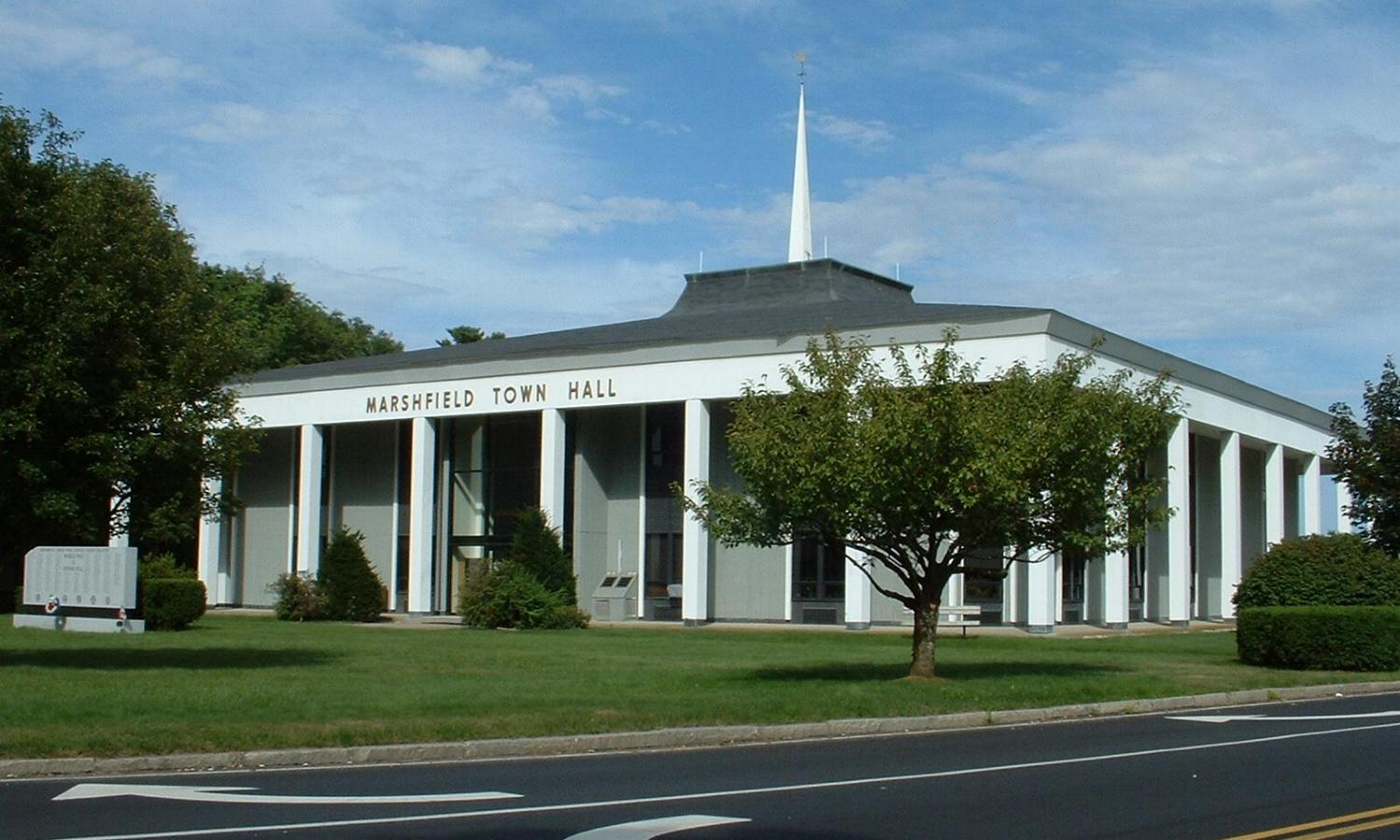
- Marshfield Town Hall

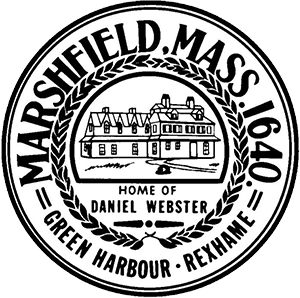
- Seal
- Motto: "Home of Daniel Webster"
- Location in Plymouth County in Massachusetts

- Location within Massachusetts Location within the United States
- Coordinates: 42°05′30″N 70°42′22″W
- Country: United States
- State: Massachusetts
- County: Plymouth
- Settled: 1632
- Incorporated: March 1, 1640

Government
  - Type: Open town meeting

Area
  - Total: 31.7 sq mi (82.2 km^{2})
  - Land: 28.5 sq mi (73.7 km^{2})
  - Water: 3.3 sq mi (8.5 km^{2})
- Elevation: 16 ft (5 m)

Population (2020)
  - Total: 25,825
  - Density: 908/sq mi (350.4/km^{2})
- Time zone: UTC−5 (Eastern)
  - Summer (DST): UTC−4 (Eastern)
- ZIP Codes: 02050 (Marshfield); 02020 (Brant Rock); 02051 (Marshfield Hills); 02060 (Ocean Bluff)
- Area code: 339/781
- FIPS code: 25-38855
- GNIS feature ID: 0619470
- Website: www.marshfield-ma.gov

Marshfield is a town in Plymouth County, Massachusetts, United States, on Massachusetts's South Shore. The population was 25,825 at the 2020 census.

It includes the census-designated places (CDPs) of Marshfield, Marshfield Hills, Ocean Bluff-Brant Rock, and Cedar Crest, and shares the Green Harbor CDP with the town of Duxbury.

== Geography ==
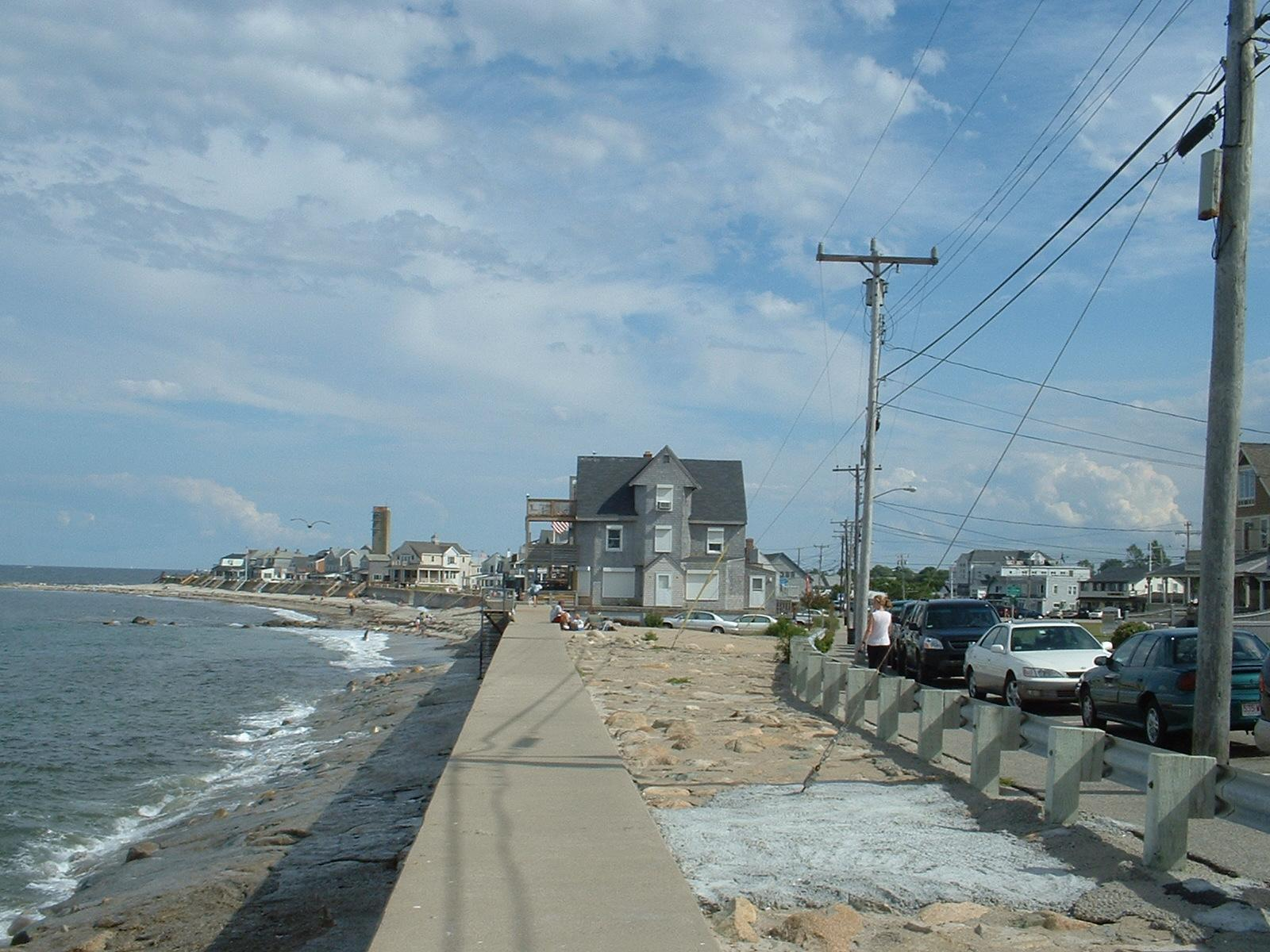
Brant Rock looking south

Marshfield is located on the South Shore, about where Cape Cod Bay meets Massachusetts Bay.

According to the United States Census Bureau, the town has a total area of 31.74 square miles (82.2 km^{2}), of which 28.46 square miles (73.7 km^{2}) is land and 3.28 square miles (8.5 km^{2}) (10.33%) is water. Marshfield is bordered by Massachusetts Bay to the east, Duxbury to the south and southeast, Pembroke to the west, Norwell to the northwest, and Scituate to the north and northeast. Marshfield is 18 miles (29 km) east of Brockton and 29 miles (47 km) southeast of Boston.

Marshfield is named for the many salt marshes which border the salt and brackish borders of the town. There are three rivers: the North (along the northern border of the town), South (which branches at the mouth of the North River and heads south through the town) and the Green Harbor River (which flows just west of Brant Rock and Green Harbor Point at the south of town).

The South River divides a peninsula from the rest of the town, where Rexhame village and the Humarock and Fourth Cliff neighborhoods of the town of Scituate lie. The Scituate neighborhoods can be reached by land by two bridges, by boat, or by foot along Rexhame Beach. The Rexhame-Humarock peninsula is a barrier beach with an 84-foot-high (26 m) moraine, one of only two barrier beach moraines on the east coast of the United States.

Marshfield is the site of several small forests and conservation areas, including the Daniel Webster Wildlife Sanctuary along the Green Harbor River and the North River Wildlife Sanctuary along Route 3A.

The town of Marshfield has six separate zip codes: Marshfield (02050), Brant Rock (02020), Ocean Bluff (02065), North Marshfield (02059), Marshfield Hills (02051), and Green Harbor (02041). There are eight villages in the town: Marshfield Center, Fieldston, Ocean Bluff, Rexhame, Brant Rock, Green Harbor, Marshfield Hills, and North Marshfield.

The following beaches comprise Marshfield's 5-mile-long (8 km) public seashore: Rexhame, Fieldston, Sunrise, Ocean Bluff, Brant Rock, Blackman's Point, Blue Fish Cove (along Cove Street between the camp ground and the big rock), and Green Harbor (also known as "Burke's Beach"). Marshfield is a popular summer beach destination. Tourists and vacationers cause the town's population to nearly double from Memorial Day through Labor Day weekend. Only full-time residents can vote on public tax matters.

== Demographics ==
Historical population
Year	Pop.	±%
1790	1,269	—
1850	1,837	+44.8%
1860	1,870	+1.8%
1870	1,659	−11.3%
1880	1,781	+7.4%
1890	1,713	−3.8%
1900	1,810	+5.7%
1910	1,738	−4.0%
1920	1,379	−20.7%
1930	1,625	+17.8%
1940	2,419	+48.9%
1950	3,267	+35.1%
1960	6,748	+106.6%
1970	15,223	+125.6%
1980	20,916	+37.4%
1990	21,531	+2.9%
2000	24,324	+13.0%
2010	25,132	+3.3%
2020	25,825	+2.8%
2024*	26,043	+0.8%
* = population estimate. Source: United States census records and Population Estimates Program data.

As of the census of 2000, there were 24,324 people, 8,905 households, and 6,598 families residing in the town. The population density was 854.8 inhabitants per square mile (330.0/km^{2}). There were 9,954 housing units at an average density of 349.8 per square mile (135.1/km^{2}). The racial makeup of the town was 92.69% White, 3.54% Black or African American, 0.11% Native American, 0.37% Asian, 0.02% Pacific Islander, 0.52% from other races, and 0.76% from two or more races. Hispanic or Latino of any race were 2.67% of the population.

There were 8,905 households, out of which 37.4% had children under the age of 18 living with them, 60.9% were married couples living together, 10.1% had a female householder with no husband present, and 25.9% were non-families. 20.9% of all households were made up of individuals, and 7.2% had someone living alone who was 65 years of age or older. The average household size was 2.73 and the average family size was 3.20.

In the town, the population was spread out, with 27.4% under the age of 18, 5.7% from 18 to 24, 31.2% from 25 to 44, 26.2% from 45 to 64, and 9.5% who were 65 years of age or older. The median age was 37 years. For every 100 females, there were 95.3 males. For every 100 females age 18 and over, there were 91.6 males.

The median income for a household in the town was $142,610. and the median income for a family was $172,330. The median home value was $890,000. Males had a median income of $111,992 versus $83,773 for females. The per capita income for the town was $92,012. About 0.6% of families and 0.2% of the population were below the poverty line, including 6.7% of those under age 18 and 4.8% of those age 65 or over.

== Government ==
On the national level, Marshfield is a part of Massachusetts's 9th congressional district, and is currently represented by William Keating (D). The state's senior (Class I) senator, elected in 2012, is Elizabeth Warren. The junior (Class II) senator, elected in 2013, is Ed Markey.

On the state level, Marshfield is represented in the Massachusetts House of Representatives as a part of the Fourth Plymouth district, which also includes much of the town of Scituate. The representative for Marshfield and Scituate in the Massachusetts House of Representatives is Patrick Kearney (D). The town is represented by Patrick O'Connor (R) in the Massachusetts Senate as a part of the Plymouth and Norfolk district, which includes the towns of Cohasset, Duxbury, Hingham, Hull, Norwell, Scituate and Weymouth. The town is patrolled by the First (Norwell) Barracks of Troop D of the Massachusetts State Police.

Marshfield is governed on the local level by the open town meeting form of government, and is led by a town administrator and a board of selectmen. The modern town hall is located at the intersection of Routes 3A and 139, just south of the South River. The town has its own police and fire stations, with firehouses located in Marshfield Hills, Ocean Bluff and near the fairgrounds. The town's Ventress Memorial Library is located a short distance east of the town hall, and is a member of the Old Colony Library Network (OCLN). There is also an independent library, the Clift Rodgers Free Library, in Marshfield Hills. The town has three post offices, in the same neighborhoods as the fire stations.

Voter registration and party enrollment as of August 24, 2024
Party	Number of Voters	Percentage
Democratic	4,084	18.95%
Republican	2,550	11.83%
Unaffiliated	14,696	68.20%
Libertarian	54	0.02%
Total	21,546	100%

== Education ==
Marshfield operates its own school system for the town's nearly 4,700 students. There are five elementary schools, one middle school, and one high school

Elementary Schools K–5:

- Edward Winslow Elementary School
- Daniel Webster Elementary School
- Martinson Elementary School
- South River Elementary School
- Eames Way Elementary School

Middle School 6–8:

- Furnace Brook Middle School

High School 9–12:

- Marshfield High School

== Infrastructure ==
=== Transportation ===
Massachusetts Route 3, also known as the Pilgrims Highway, skirts the town along the Pembroke town line, and can be accessed in Marshfield via the Route 139 exit. Route 139 loops through the town, with a long portion passing along the beaches of the Ocean Bluff and Fieldston neighborhoods before heading north and east into Pembroke. Route 3A also passes through the town, entering from the south in Duxbury and exiting over the North River into Scituate.

There is daily bus service connecting with the MBTA station in Braintree and another bus connecting with South Station in Boston. The nearest MBTA Commuter Rail station Greenbush station in neighboring Scituate, which is also the terminus. There is also a commuter ferry to Boston available in Hingham. The nearest major airport is Logan International Airport in Boston. The area is also served by T.F. Green Airport in Rhode Island and the town's own municipal airport for general aviation. The nearest freight rail service is in Wareham.

== Notable people ==
- F. Lee Bailey, attorney
- Steve Carell and his wife Nancy Carell (formerly Nancy Walls), comedians/actors
- Joe Castiglione, baseball radio announcer, Boston Red Sox
- Susan Cooper, writer
- Chris Corcoran, soccer defender in MLS and international leagues
- Jeff Corwin, naturalist, host of The Jeff Corwin Experience on Animal Planet
- Becky DelosSantos, Playboy Playmate of the Month for April 1994
- Reginald Fessenden 1866–1932, radio pioneer
- Ryan Gibbons, National Football League offensive lineman (Dallas Cowboys)
- Philip W. Johnston, former Secretary of Human Services in Massachusetts and former chair of the Massachusetts Democratic Party
- Joseph Patrick Kennedy II, former U.S. congressman, son of Bobby Kennedy
- Lou Merloni, former MLB player and broadcaster
- Sean Morris, lacrosse player
- Sean Morey, NFL wide receiver (Arizona Cardinals)
- Lance Norris, writer and actor
- Dave O'Brien, play-by-play announcer for the Boston Red Sox on NESN
- Adelaide Phillipps, most famous female opera singer in America during the 19th century
- Jeremy Roenick, former NHL player
- Tom Scott, Oscar and Emmy-winning sound engineer.
- Edward Rowe Snow, lighthouse historian and author
- Mike Sullivan, National Hockey League head coach (Pittsburgh Penguins) and former player
- John Thomas (1724–1776), general in the Continental Army during the American Revolution. He led the 2nd Massachusetts Regiment, composed of volunteers from Plymouth County during the Siege of Boston. Thomas Park, a national historical site and monument on Dorchester Heights in South Boston commemorating the Siege of Boston, was named after him. Thomaston, Maine, is also named after him
- Zach Triner, American football long snapper in the NFL for the Tampa Bay Buccaneers
- Steven Tyler, lead singer for the band Aerosmith
- David Warsofsky (born 1990), National Hockey League player (Boston Bruins)
- Ryan Warsofsky (born 1987), National Hockey League Head Coach (San Jose Sharks)
- Daniel Webster (1782–1852), statesman, orator, senator, Secretary of State to three U.S. presidents
- Fletcher Webster, son of Daniel Webster; gave his life for the Union in the Second Battle of Bull Run
- Peregrine White, first English child born in New England
- Edward Winslow (1595–1655), Pilgrim Governor of the Plymouth Colony
- John Winslow, Major-General in British Army who removed the Acadians from Nova Scotia, as described in famous Longfellow poem, "Evangeline". The town of Winslow, Maine is named after him
- Josiah Winslow, first native-born governor of the Plymouth Colony
