= Faneuil =

Faneuil may refer to:

- Peter Faneuil, (1700–1743), prominent American
- Faneuil Hall, a meeting hall in Boston, Massachusetts
- Peter Faneuil School, Boston, Massachusetts
