= James T. Kelley (architect) =

American architect

James Templeton Kelley
- Born: September 4, 1855; Roxbury, Massachusetts
- Died: January 4, 1929 (aged 73); Washington, DC
- Occupation: Architect

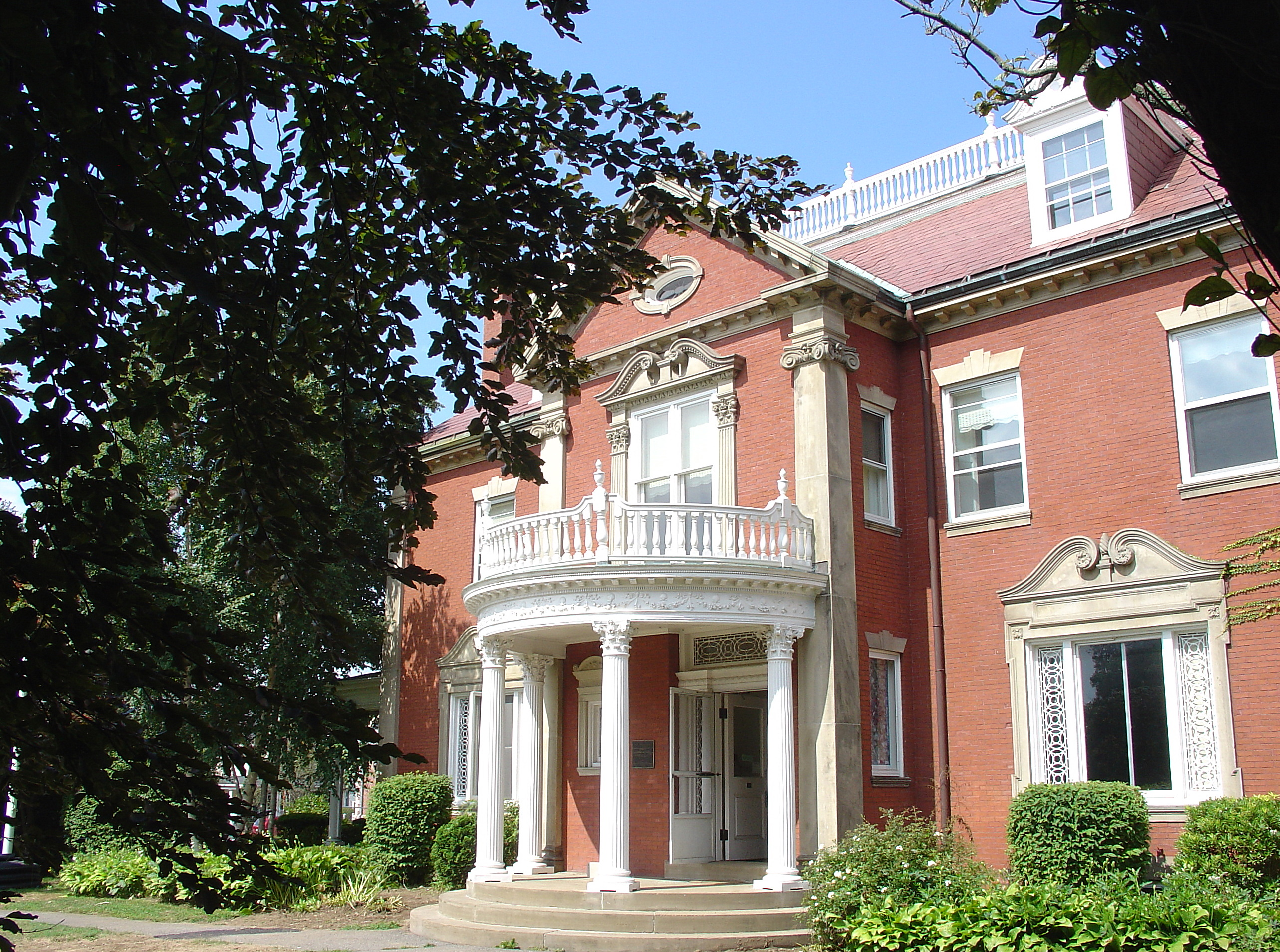
The Town Hall of Swampscott, Massachusetts, originally designed by Kelley in 1889 as the home of Elihu Thomson.

James T. Kelley (1855–1929) was an American architect practicing in Boston, Massachusetts.

== Life and career ==
James Templeton Kelley was born September 4, 1855, in Roxbury, Massachusetts to Thomas Kelley and Jane (Stinson) Kelley. Kelley worked for Sturgis & Brigham before opening his own office in 1886. In the 1890s he was joined by draftsman and later architect Harold S. Graves, who took over the practice when Kelley retired after World War I. Kelley was best known for his work in the Colonial Revival style, and was noted as active in its revival.

Kelley was a founding member of the Boston Architectural Club in 1889, and joined the American Institute of Architects in 1901.

== Personal life ==
Kelley was first married in 1882 to Eleanor Hale Sweetser of Lynn, who died in 1922 while traveling abroad in France. In 1923 he remarried to Marion (Seaverns) Williams, as her second husband. They had no children. For much of his life, Kelley lived and worked in a house at 57 Mount Vernon Street in Beacon Hill, which he bought from the estate of Charles Francis Adams. Circa 1911-13 he and his first wife built a second home, designed by himself, at 12 Tupelo Road in Swampscott.

Kelley died January 4, 1929, while traveling in Washington, DC.

== Legacy ==
Several of Kelley's works have been listed on the United States National Register of Historic Places, and others contribute to listed historic districts.

The James Templeton Kelley Prize, awarded by the Boston Society of Architects to students in the Harvard Graduate School of Design, is named for Kelley. This was established in 1929 by his second wife, Marion Kelley, as a traveling fellowship.

== Architectural works ==
- Brewster Memorial Hall, 86 S Main St, Wolfeboro, New Hampshire (1888–1890, NRHP 1983)
- House for Charles W. Porter, (Note: A contributing property to the Diamond Historic District, NRHP-listed in 1996.) 40 Nahant St, Lynn, Massachusetts (1889)
- House for Elihu Thomson, (Note: Presently the Swampscott Town Hall) (Note: A contributing property to the Olmsted Subdivision Historic District, NRHP-listed in 2002.) 22 Monument Ave, Swampscott, Massachusetts (1889, NHL and NRHP 1976)
- Brewster Academy, 80 Academy Dr, Wolfeboro, New Hampshire (1890, burned)
- House for J. Arthur Beebe, (Note: A contributing property to the Back Bay Historic District, NRHP-listed in 1973.) 199 Commonwealth Ave, Boston, Massachusetts (1890–1891)
- Lynn Bank Block, 21-29 Exchange St, Lynn, Massachusetts (1891, NRHP 1982)
- House for Charles Lovejoy, 64 Broad St, Lynn, Massachusetts (1893, NRHP 1978)
- House for Henry R. Reed, 46 Water St, Marion, Massachusetts (1893, NRHP 2019)
- House for Edward laCroix, 243 Ocean St, Lynn, Massachusetts (1895)
- House for T. Dennie Thomson, 54 Abbot St, Andover, Massachusetts (1895–96)
- Chatsworth Hall, 252-254 Ocean St, Lynn, Massachusetts (1898)
- House for Seth M. Richards, (Note: Presently the Richards Free Library.) 58 N Main St, Newport, New Hampshire (1898–1899, NRHP 1984)
- House for Loren G. duBois, 405 Commonwealth Ave, Boston, Massachusetts (1900–1901)
- Crowell Memorial Chapel, Rosedale Cemetery, 4 Rosedale Ave, Manchester, Massachusetts (1903)
- House for Albert Eisemann, (Note: A contributing property to the Longwood Historic District, NRHP-listed in 1978.) 4 Monmouth St, Brookline, Massachusetts (1904)
- "Greatwood Farm" for Willard S. Martin, (Note: Since 1938 this has been the main campus of Goddard College.) 123 Pitkin Rd, Plainfield, Vermont (1908, NRHP 1996)
- Peter Faneuil School (former), (Note: A contributing property to the Beacon Hill Historic District, NRHP-listed in 1966.) 60 Joy St, Boston, Massachusetts (1909–1910, NRHP 1994)
- House for Henry W. Keene, (Note: A contributing property to the Lincoln Historic District, NRHP-listed in 1991.) 10 Miles Rd, Hingham, Massachusetts (1909)
- Swampscott Public Library, 61 Burrill St, Swampscott, Massachusetts (1917)
- South Congregational Church parsonage, (Note: Donated to the church by Lizzie M. Richards, widow of Seth M. Richards for whom Kelley designed a house in 1898.) 20 Church St, Newport, New Hampshire (1918, NRHP 1989)

== Gallery of architectural works ==
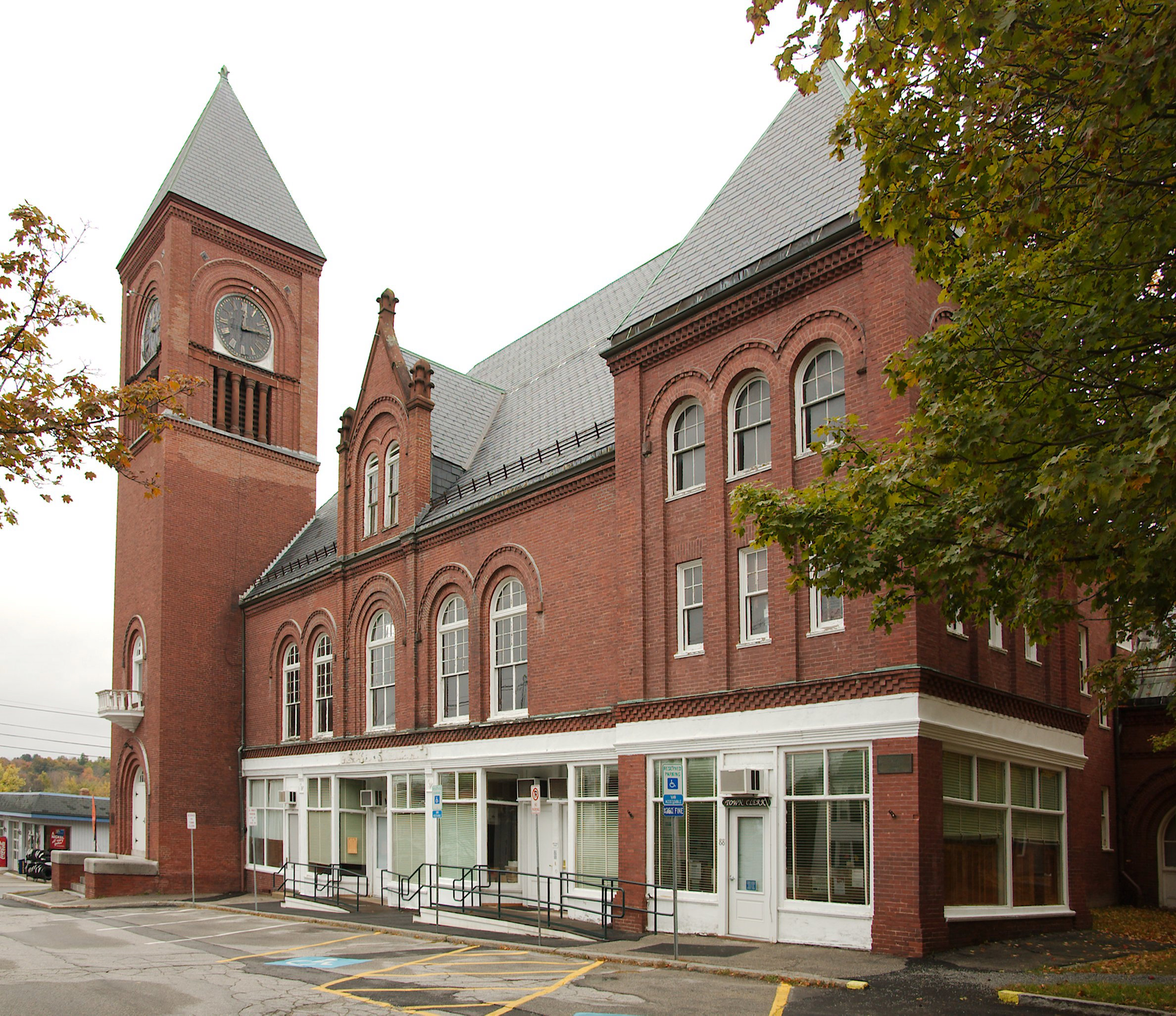
Brewster Memorial Hall, Wolfeboro, New Hampshire, 1888-90.

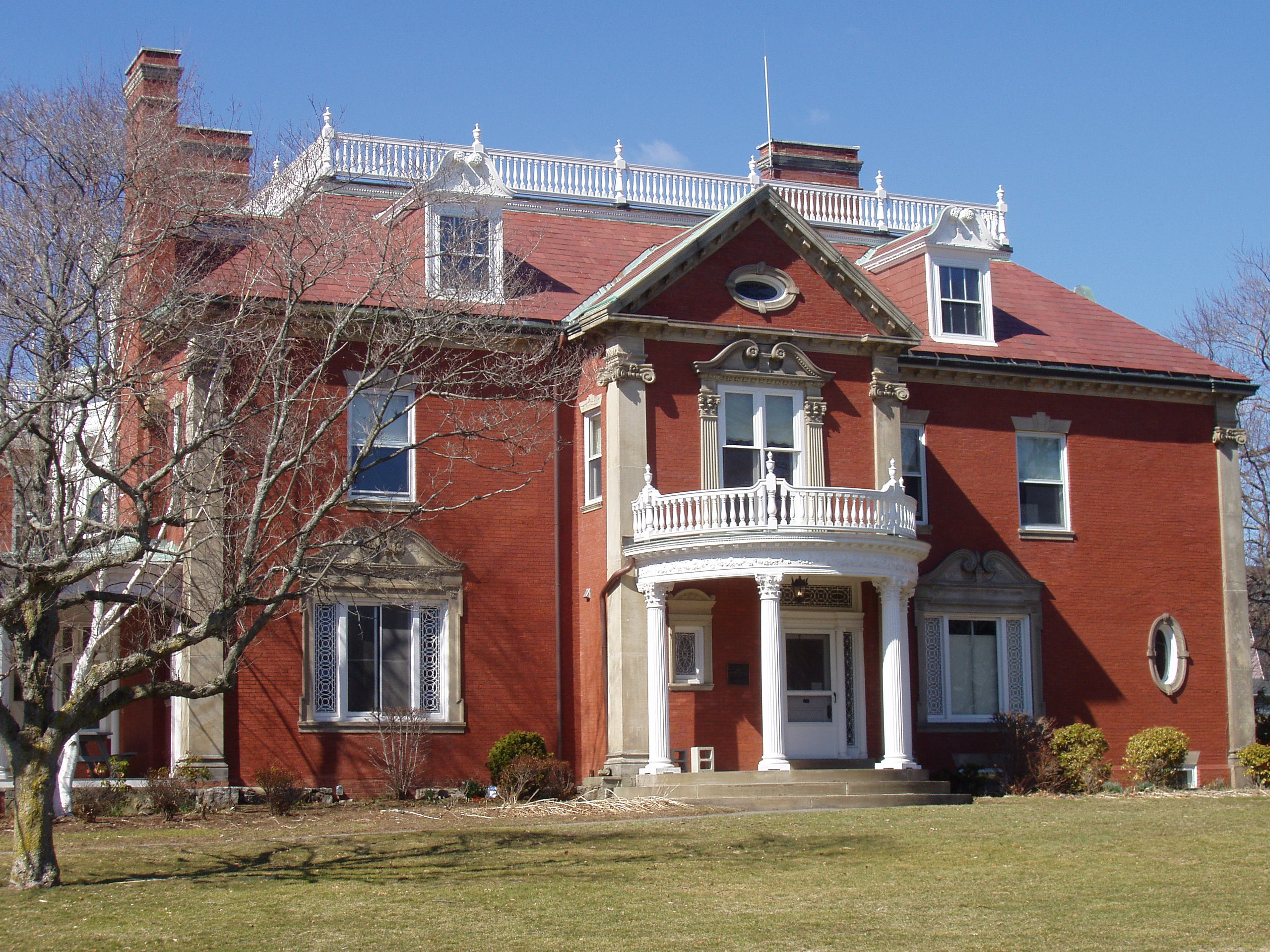
House for Elihu Thomson, Swampscott, Massachusetts, 1889.

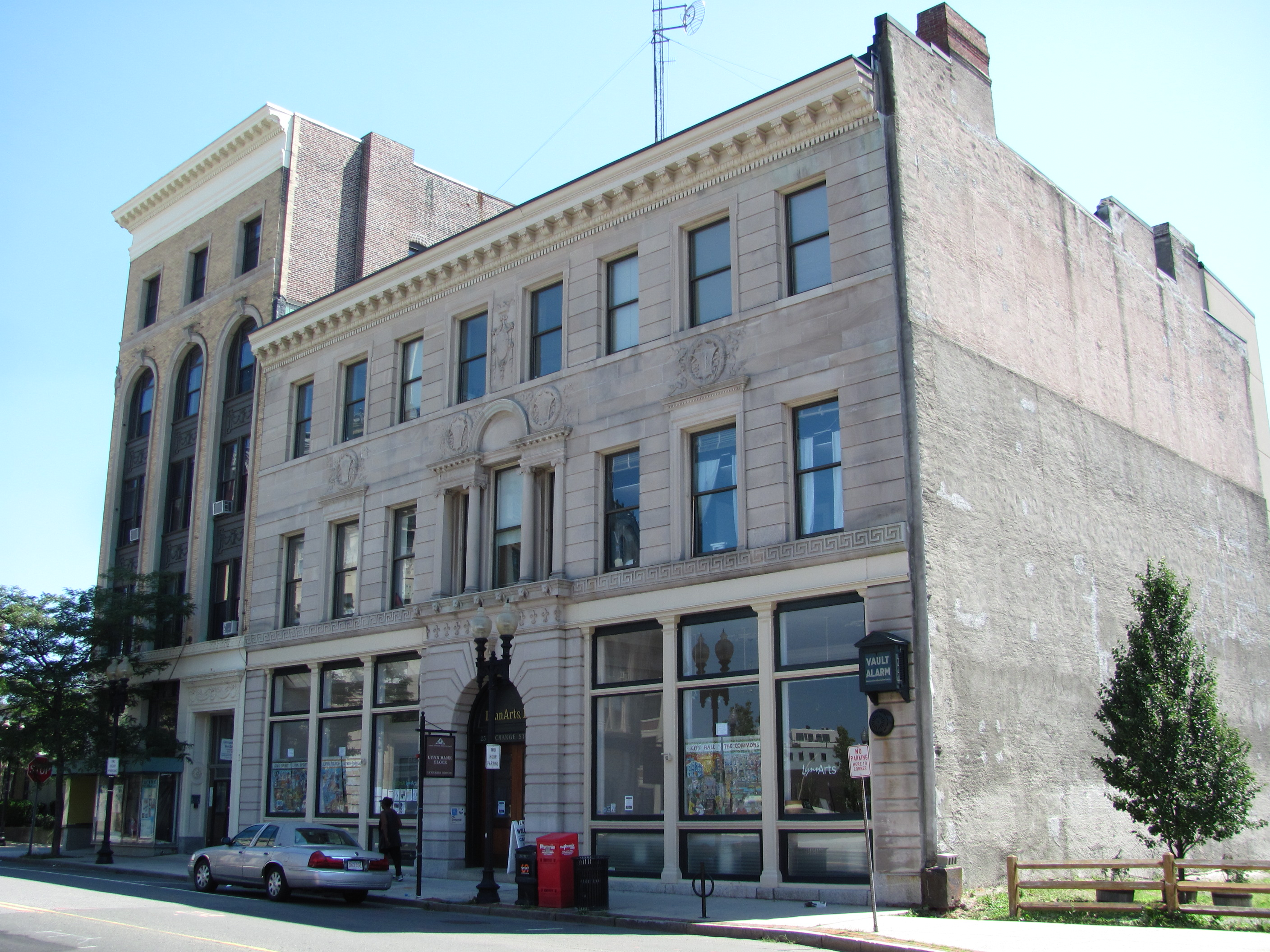
Lynn Bank Block, Lynn, Massachusetts, 1891.

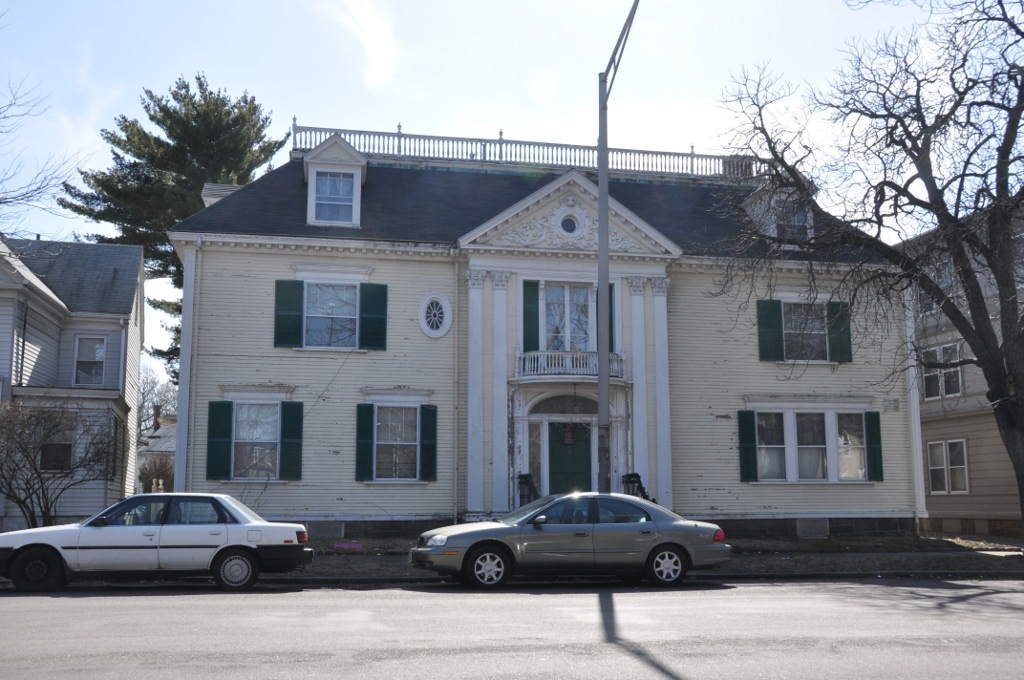
House for Charles Lovejoy, Lynn, Massachusetts, 1893.

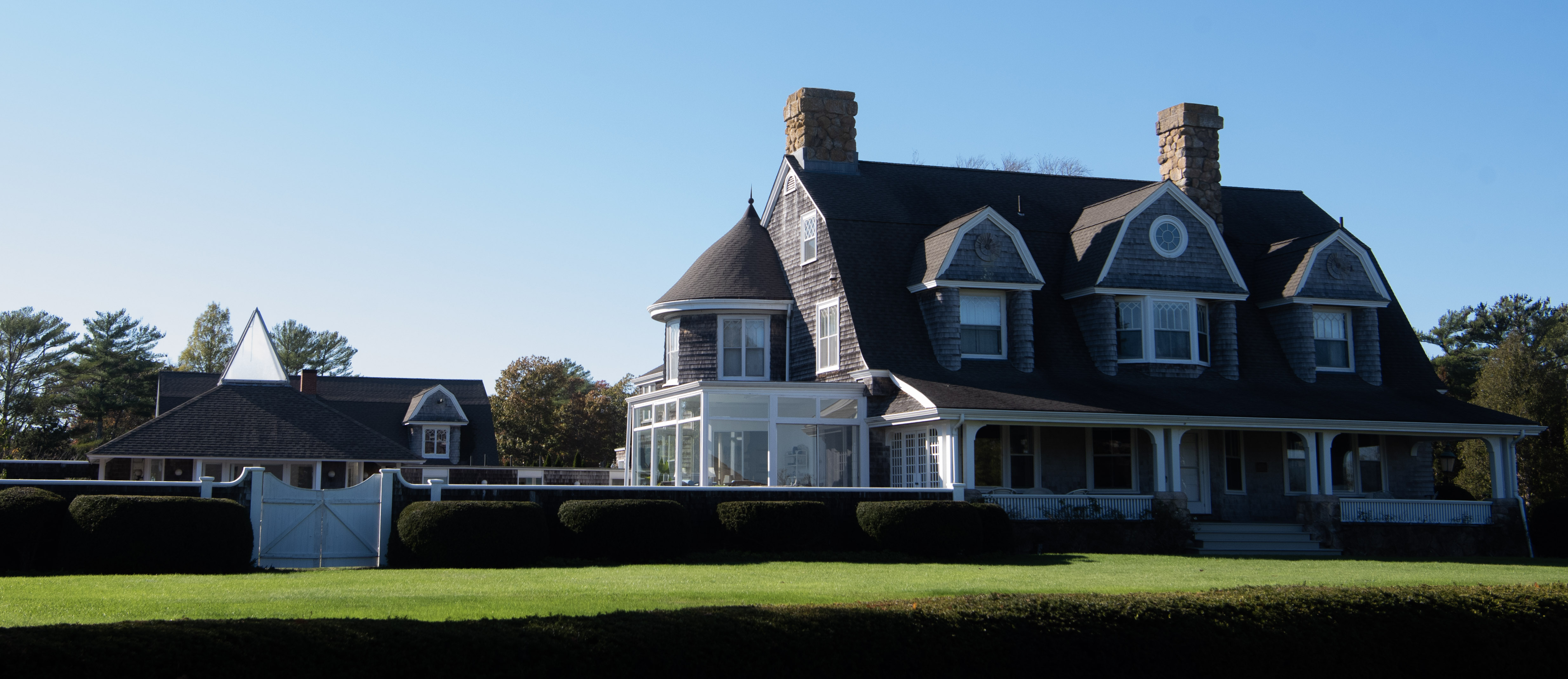
House for Henry R. Reed, Marion, Massachusetts, 1893.

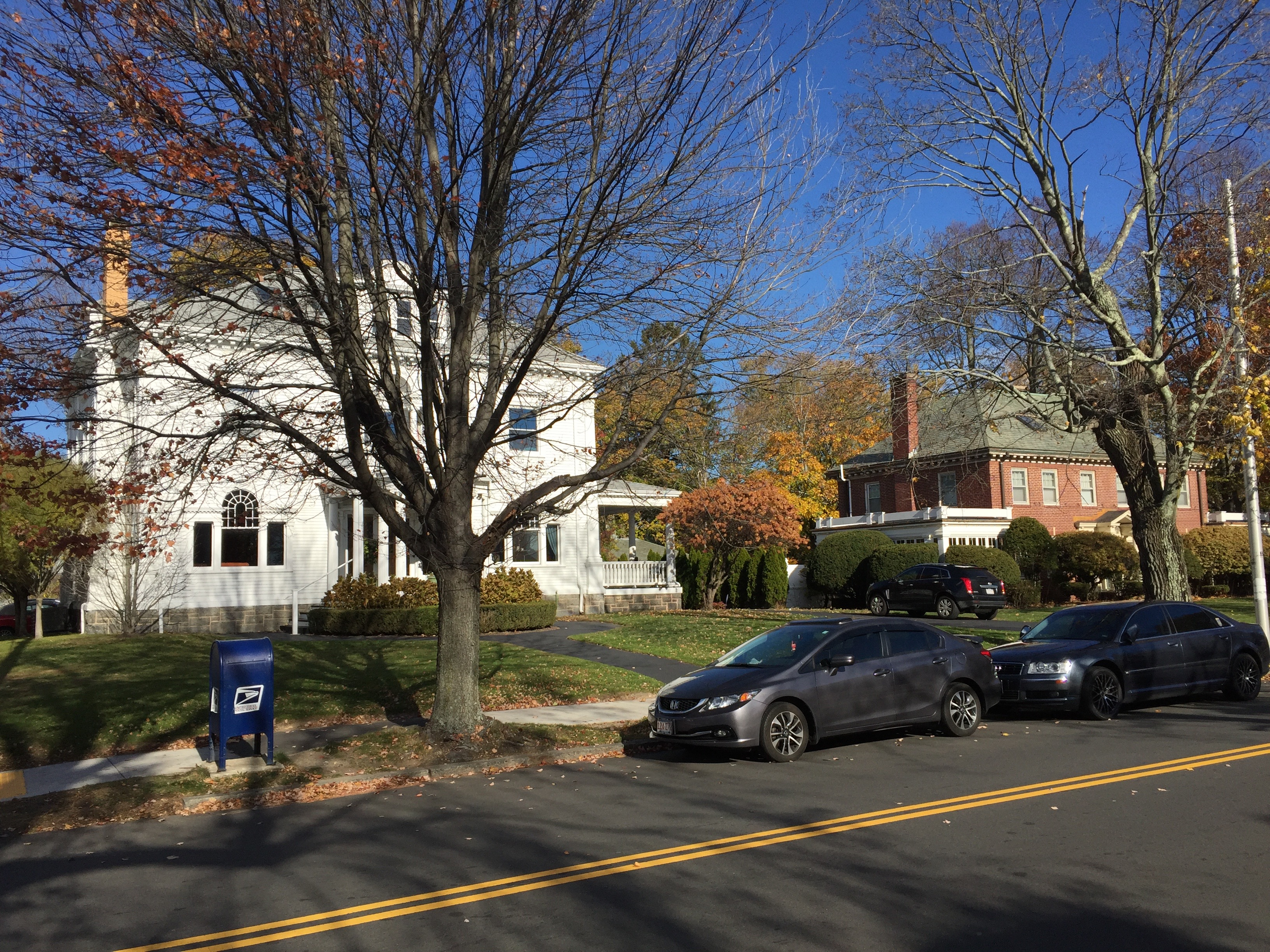
House for Edward laCroix (left), Lynn, Massachusetts, 1895.

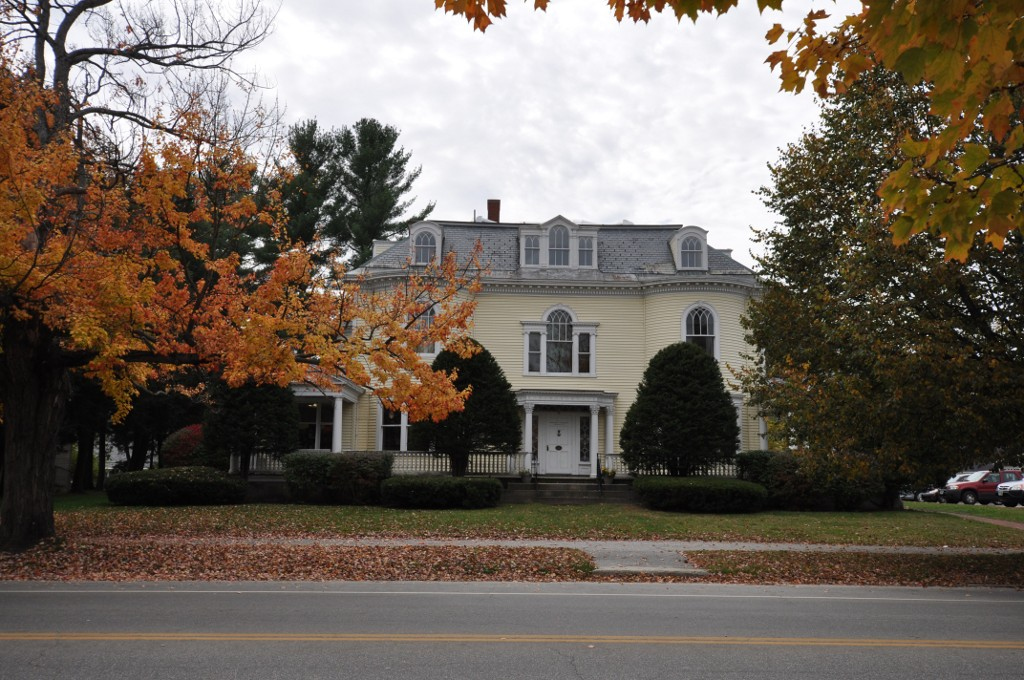
House for Seth M. Richards, Newport, New Hampshire, 1898-99.

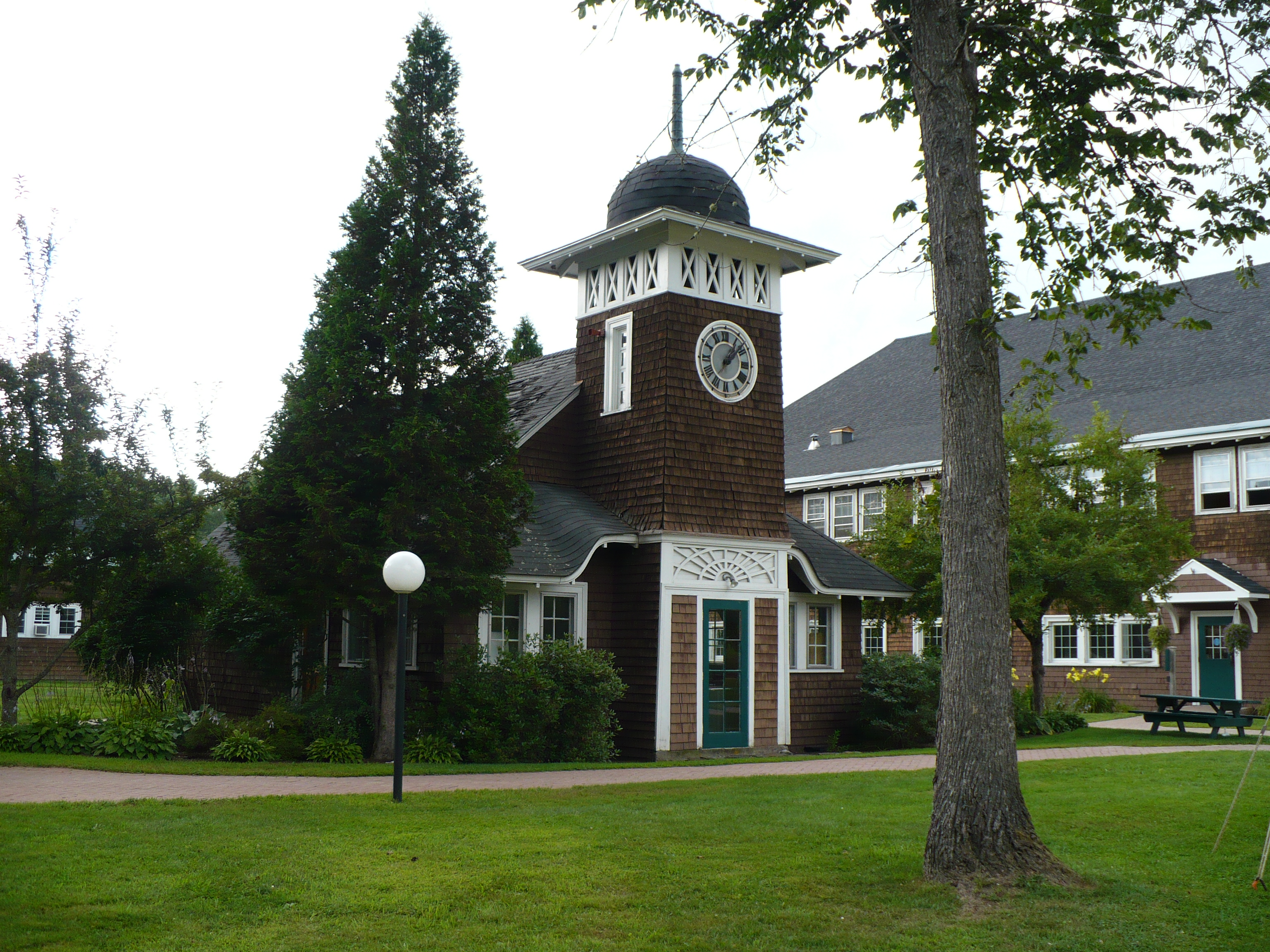
Greatwood Farm outbuildings, Plainfield, Vermont, 1908.

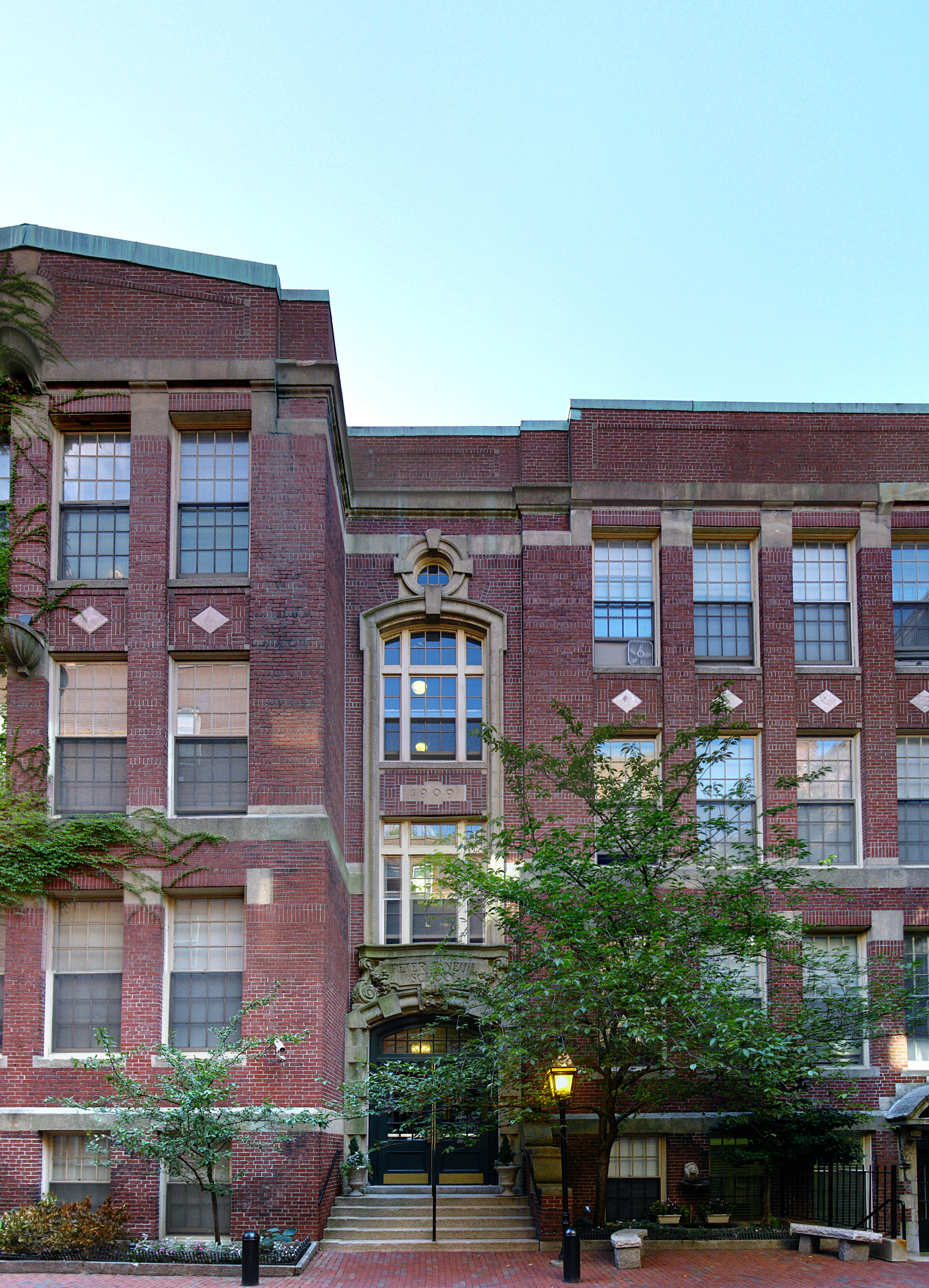
Peter Faneuil School, Boston, Massachusetts, 1909-10.

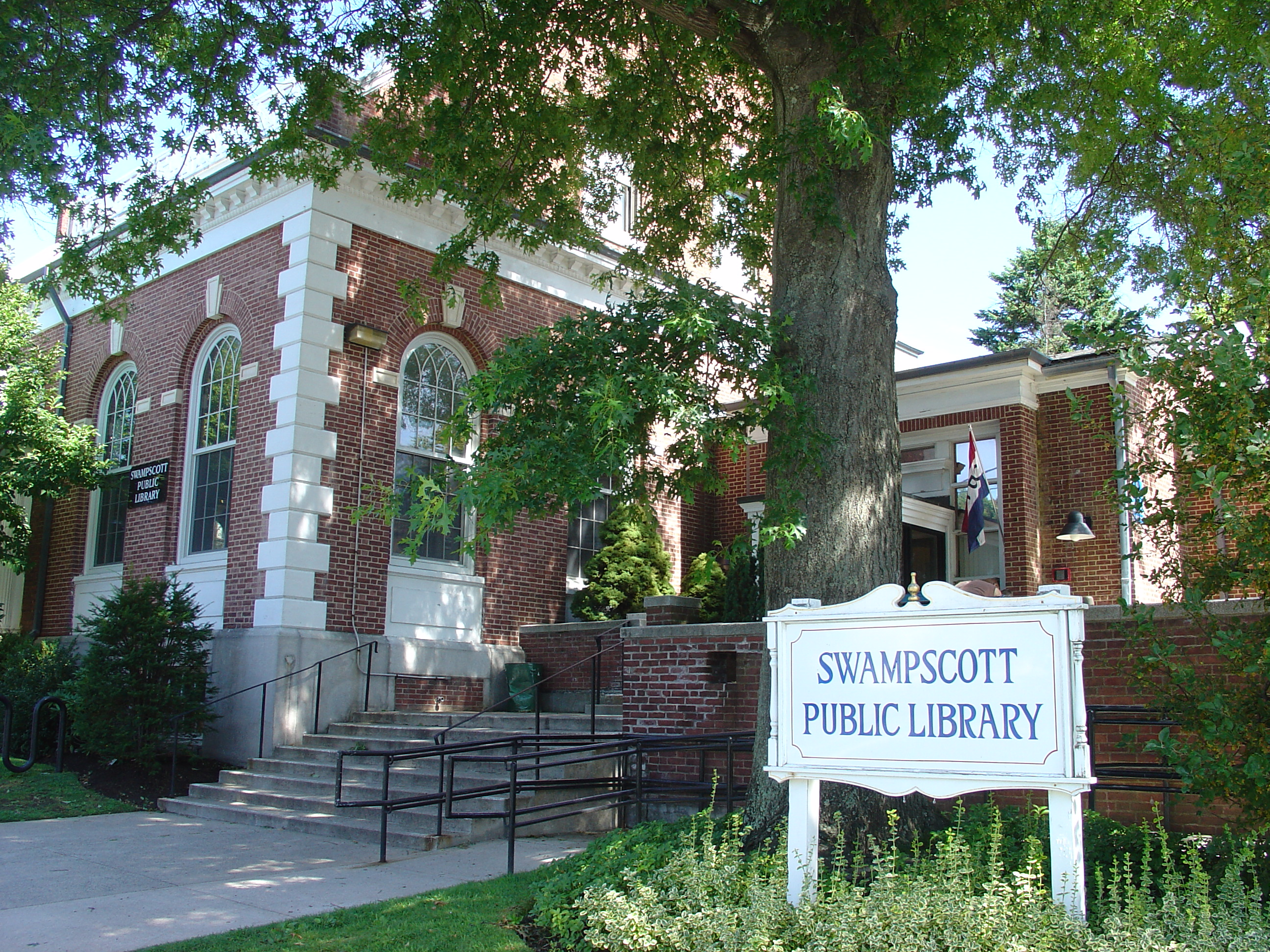
Swampscott Public Library, Swampscott, Massachusetts, 1917.
