= John Humphreys House =

Historic house in Massachusetts, United States

- Sir John Humphreys House
- U.S. National Register of Historic Places
- U.S. Historic district – Contributing property
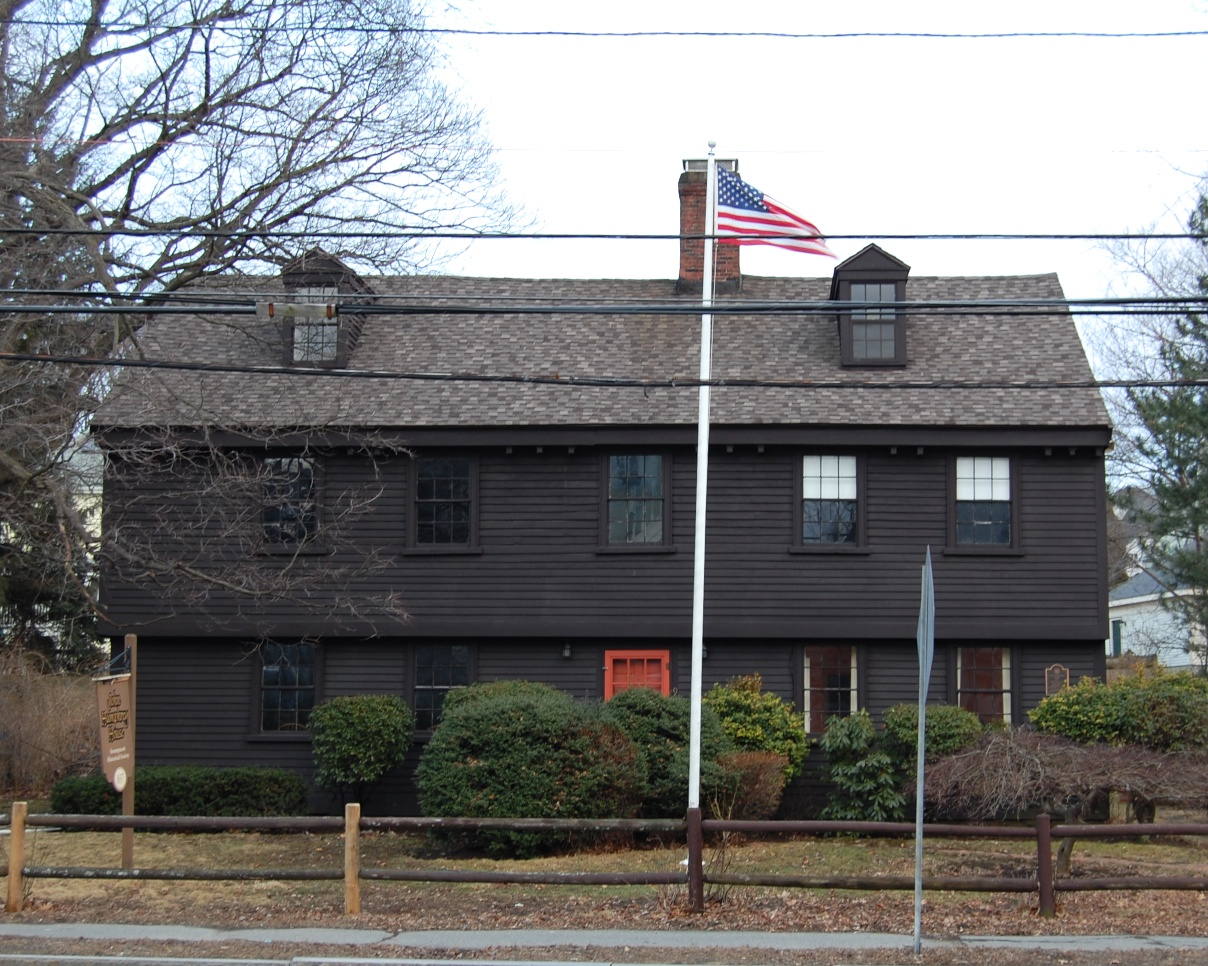
- The John Humphreys House

- Location within Massachusetts Location within the United States
- Location: 99 Paradise Rd., Swampscott, Massachusetts
- Coordinates: 42°28′21″N 70°55′6″W
- Built: c. 1700
- Architectural style: First Period
- Part of: Olmsted Subdivision Historic District (ID02000696)
- MPS: First Period Buildings of Eastern Massachusetts TR
- NRHP reference No.: 90000258

Significant dates
- Added to NRHP: March 9, 1990
- Designated CP: July 1, 2002

The John Humphreys House, also known as Sir John Humphreys House, is a historic house museum located in Swampscott, Massachusetts. Although it was long thought to be associated with John Humphrey, an early deputy governor of the Massachusetts Bay Colony, it was more likely built about 1700, based on architectural analysis. In 1641 Deborah Moody bought the Humphrey house (which he called Swampscott) and 900 acres when the Humphreys returned to England giving her over 1300 acres of what would become Swampscott, Massachusetts. The house was originally located on what is now Elmwood Road (a plaque marks the site), but moved to its current location in 1891 as the Olmsted district was developed. It is currently owned by the Swampscott Historical Society. It was listed on the National Register of Historic Places in 1990.

== See also ==
- List of historic houses in Massachusetts
- List of the oldest buildings in Massachusetts
- National Register of Historic Places listings in Essex County, Massachusetts
