= South Congregational Church =

South Congregational Church may refer to:

- South Congregational Church (New Britain, Connecticut), listed on the National Register of Historic Places (NRHP)
- South Congregational Church (Springfield, Massachusetts), NRHP-listed
- South Congregational Church (Newport, New Hampshire), NRHP-listed
- South Congregational Church, Chapel, Ladies Parlor, and Rectory, Carroll Gardens, Brooklyn, New York, NRHP-listed
