= Swampscott Town Hall =

Historic government building in Massachusetts, United States

- Elihu Thomson House
- U.S. National Register of Historic Places
- U.S. National Historic Landmark
- U.S. Historic district – Contributing property
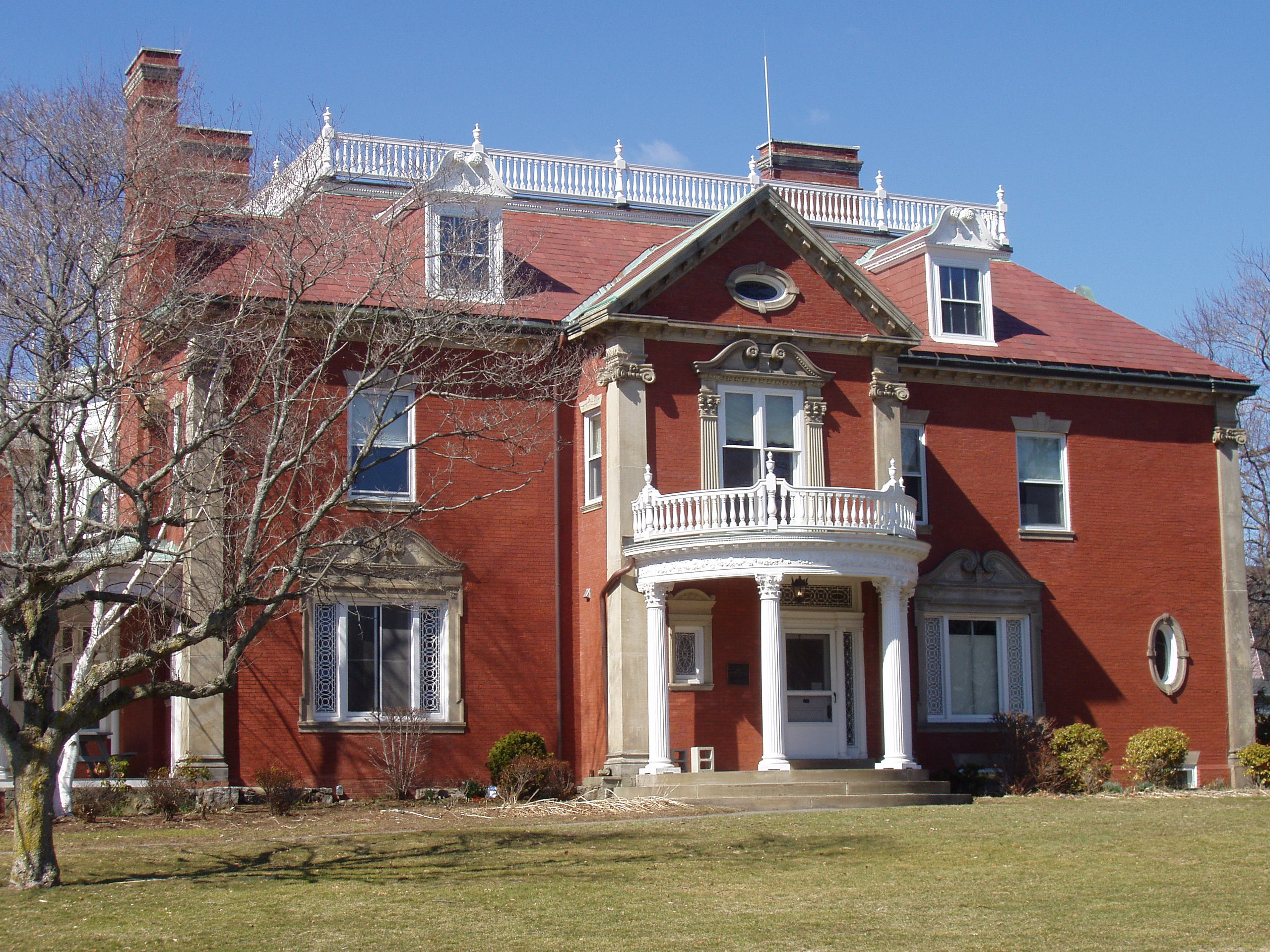
- Elihu Thomson House

- Location within Massachusetts Location within the United States
- Interactive map showing the location of Elihu Thomson House
- Location: 22 Monument Avenue, Swampscott, Massachusetts
- Coordinates: 42°28′11″N 70°55′8″W
- Area: less than one acre
- Built: 1889
- Architect: James T. Kelley
- Architectural style: Colonial Revival
- Part of: Olmsted Subdivision Historic District (ID02000696)
- NRHP reference No.: 76002002

Significant dates
- Added to NRHP: January 7, 1976
- Designated NHL: January 7, 1976
- Designated CP: July 1, 2002

Swampscott Town Hall, previously the Elihu Thomson House, is a historic building in Swampscott, Massachusetts. The house was designed by architect James T. Kelley and built in 1889 for the noted inventor, electrical engineer, and industrialist Elihu Thomson (1853-1937). Thomson was, with Edwin J. Houston, co-founder of the Thomson-Houston Electric Company which would later merge with Thomas Edison's Edison General Electric Company to become the General Electric Company. The house was built with an observatory, which no longer exists. It has housed Swampscott town offices since 1944, when it was given to the town by Thomson's heirs. The building was declared a National Historic Landmark in 1976 for its association with Thomson.

== Description ==
Swampscott Town Hall is set on an expansive lot overlooking the town's soldiers memorial and Linscott Park in the town center. It is a two-story brick Georgian Revival structure with a tiled hip roof that is crowned by a low balustrade with turned balusters and urn-topped posts. The main facade is asymmetrically fenestrated, but there are symmetrically placed gable dormers in the roof, and the entrance is in a slightly off-center gable-topped projection. The building corners, as well as those of the entry section, have Ionic stone pilasters at the corners. The main entrance is sheltered by a round portico supported by fluted Corinthian columns, which supported an entablature with a carved frieze. The portico is topped by a balcony with a low railing slightly different from that on the roof. Above the entrance is a French door flanked by stone fluted Corinthian pilasters, and topped by a scrollwork pediment. Large windows on either side of the entrance on the first floor are topped by similar pediments.

Upon entry through the front door, there is a vestibule lit through stained-glass windows, followed by a panelled entry hall, which leads to a large two-story living space in the rear of the house, from which a grand staircase rises to the second floor. Pocket doors from these halls lead to what were formerly living and dining rooms at the front of the house, and there is a small guest bathroom immediately left of the vestibule in the front projection. A significant portion of the woodwork in the downstairs has been lost due to the building's conversion for municipal use, but the living room, which now serves as the selectmen's office, and the central hall are largely intact. Also well-preserved is one of the children's bedrooms upstairs, which has a Moorish theme.

Behind the main house is Thomson's original carriage house, which was originally connected to the main house by a covered walkway, since replaced by an enclosed passage. This alteration resulted in the loss of a projecting bow window. Above the carriage house is a space that was used by Elihu Thomson as a laboratory.

== History ==
The house was designed by James T. Kelley in collaboration with Harold S. Graves, a team that also designed the Swampscott Public Library (completed 1917). Elihu Thomson, their client, is said to have taken an active role in the design of the structure, selecting interior finishes and other details. Thomson lived, and frequently also worked on his inventions, at the property until his death in 1937. It was presented by his heirs to the town in his memory, and is now known as the Elihu Thomson Memorial Administration Building.

Elihu Thomson was born in Manchester, England, and came to the United States as a child. Showing an early aptitude for research and experimentation, he taught at a Philadelphia high school, and developed a practical arc lamp system with a colleague. Funded by New England businessmen, this idea was commercialized, and the Thomson-Houston Electric Company was by 1890 a leading maker of electrical equipment. In 1892 it merged with Thomas Edison's Edison General Electric Company to form the company known today as General Electric. His contributions to science and engineering thereafter include a wide range of practical advances in the application of electricity, and included more than 700 patents. Thomson is also credited with establishing the idea that industrial research and development was an important component of a successful business, including the creation of laboratories that perform pure scientific research.

== See also ==
- List of historic houses in Massachusetts
- List of National Historic Landmarks in Massachusetts
- National Register of Historic Places listings in Essex County, Massachusetts
