= Lynn Bank Block =

- U.S. National Register of Historic Places
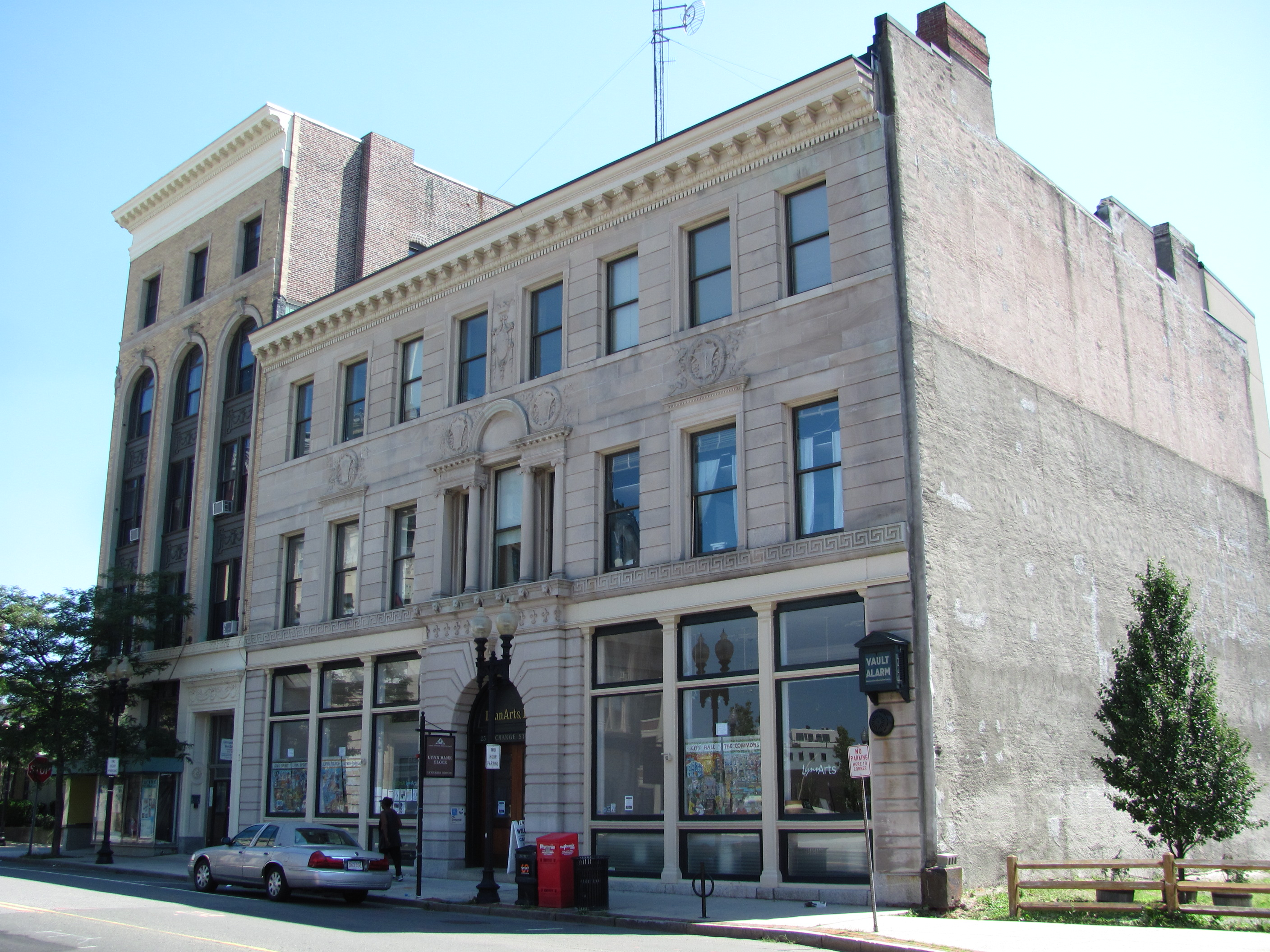
- Lynn Bank Block

- Location within Massachusetts Location within the United States
- Location: Lynn, Massachusetts
- Coordinates: 42°27′49″N 70°56′36″W
- Built: 1891
- Architect: James T. Kelley, Thomas M. James Co., Mary Almy
- NRHP reference No.: 82004964
- Added to NRHP: August 26, 1982

The Lynn Bank Block is a historic bank building at 21–29 Exchange Street in Lynn, Massachusetts. The three-story building was built for the First National Bank of Lynn and the Lynn Institution for Savings in 1891. It was the first Colonial Revival construction in Lynn's rebuilding effort after a disastrous fire destroyed much of its central business district in 1889. Most of the earlier buildings erected after the fire were in Romanesque Revival styling. The building features a large central entry section with an arch framing a recessed doorway and a Palladian window above, which is flanked by columns. On either side of the entry the building extends for three window bays. The two banking institutions shared the building, one occupying each side.

The building was listed on the National Register of Historic Places in 1982.

The building currently serves as the headquarters of LynnArts, a local arts organization. It was also home to the studios of noted independent alternative rock station, WFNX for the station's entire existence from 1983 to 2012. Both LynnArts and WFNX used the address of the building as 25 Exchange Street.

== See also ==
- National Register of Historic Places listings in Lynn, Massachusetts
- National Register of Historic Places listings in Essex County, Massachusetts
