= South Congregational Church (Newport, New Hampshire) =

Historic church in New Hampshire, United States

- U.S. National Register of Historic Places
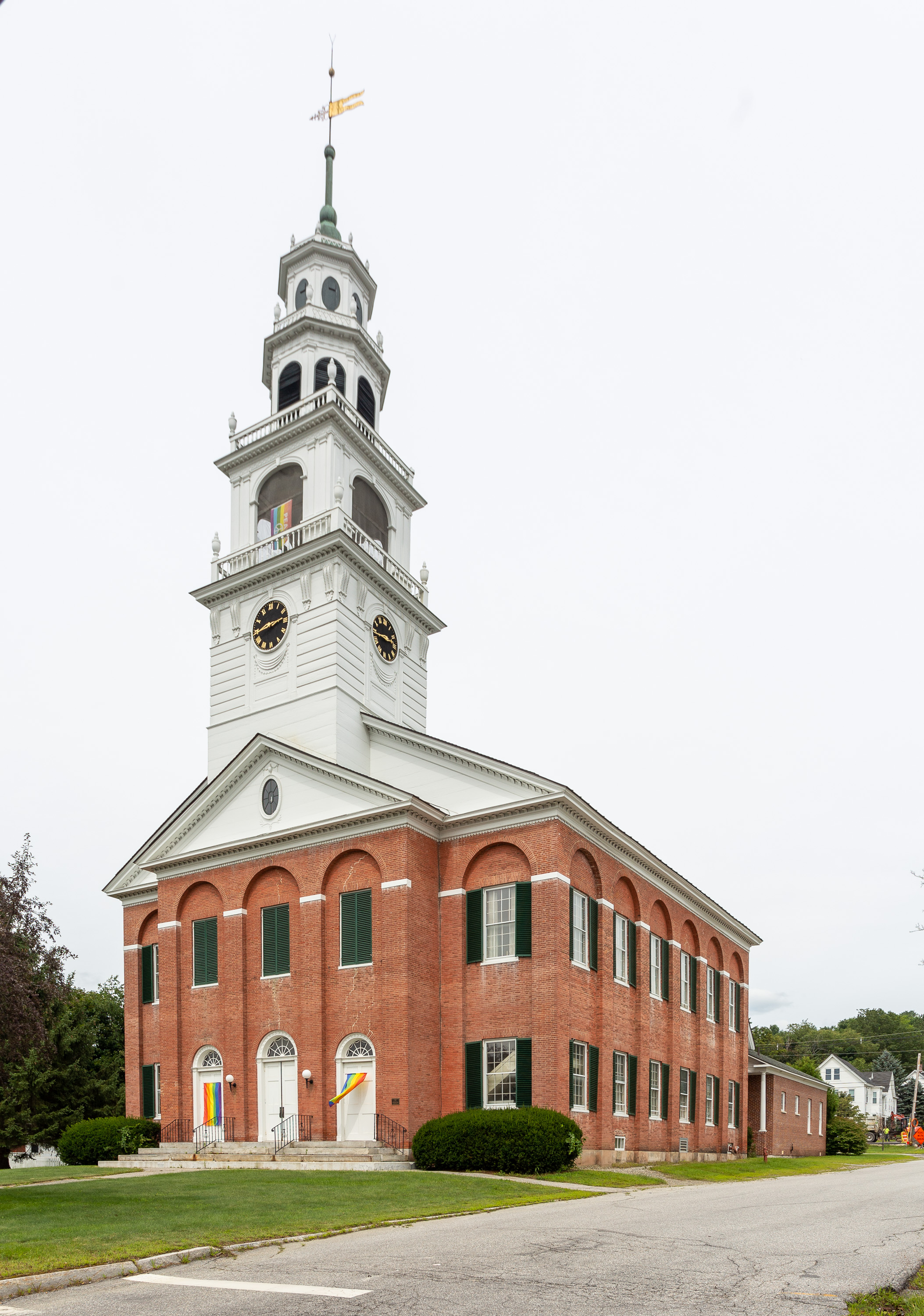

- Location within New Hampshire Location within the United States
- Location: 58 S. Main St., Newport, New Hampshire
- Coordinates: 43°21′40″N 72°10′14″W
- Area: 1.7 acres (0.69 ha)
- Built: 1823; 1918 (parsonage)
- Architect: John Leach; James T. Kelley (parsonage)
- Architectural style: Colonial Revival, Federal
- NRHP reference No.: 89000187
- Added to NRHP: March 30, 1989

South Congregational Church (also known as United Church of Christ in Newport) is a historic church building at 58 S. Main Street (New Hampshire Route 10) in Newport, New Hampshire. The two-story brick church was built in 1823 by the carpenter John Leach for a congregation established in 1779, and is the most northerly of a series of rural churches based on a design used by Elias Carter in the design of the Congregational church in Templeton, Massachusetts. The church building was listed on the National Register of Historic Places in 1989. The congregation is affiliated with the United Church of Christ.

== Description and history ==
The South Congregational Church is located (as its name suggests) south of the commercial and civic heart of downtown Newport, at the northeast corner of South Main and Church streets. It is a two-story brick building, with gabled roof. Its front facade is five bays wide, with a gabled entry pavilion projecting from the center three. The bays on the front and sides are articulated by brick piers, which rise to join by arches below the roof cornice. Doorways are set in the three central bays, topped by half-round transom windows. A four-stage tower rises above the entrances, each tier topped by a low balustrade with urned posts. The bottom two stages house a clock and belfry respectively, the latter with arched openings. The church bell was cast in 1822 by Paul Revere & Sons and weighs 1,241 pounds (563 kg). The upper two stages are octagonal, and are capped by a cupola.

Built in 1823, the church is one of western New Hampshire's finest surviving Federal period churches. It was built two years after the similar Acworth Congregational Church, a wooden church tentatively attributed to builder Elias Carter. Carter's designs are known to have been an influence on church construction in the region during the early 19th century, with numerous churches drawing inspiration from the church he built in Templeton, Massachusetts.

The church congregation was founded in 1779. The church's location, outside the present downtown, is the result of a long-running dispute within the town of where its civic heart should be located. The consequence of this disagreement resulted in the placement of the Baptist church at the town common (north of the present-day commercial downtown), and the placement of this church here.

In 1918 the church built a parsonage on the north side of the lot. This was built with funds donated by Lizzie M. Richards and designed by James T. Kelley of Boston. Kelley had previously designed Richards' house in 1898.

== See also ==
- National Register of Historic Places listings in Sullivan County, New Hampshire
