= Lucian Newhall House (Lynn, Massachusetts) =

Historic house in Massachusetts, United States

- U.S. National Register of Historic Places
- U.S. Historic district – Contributing property
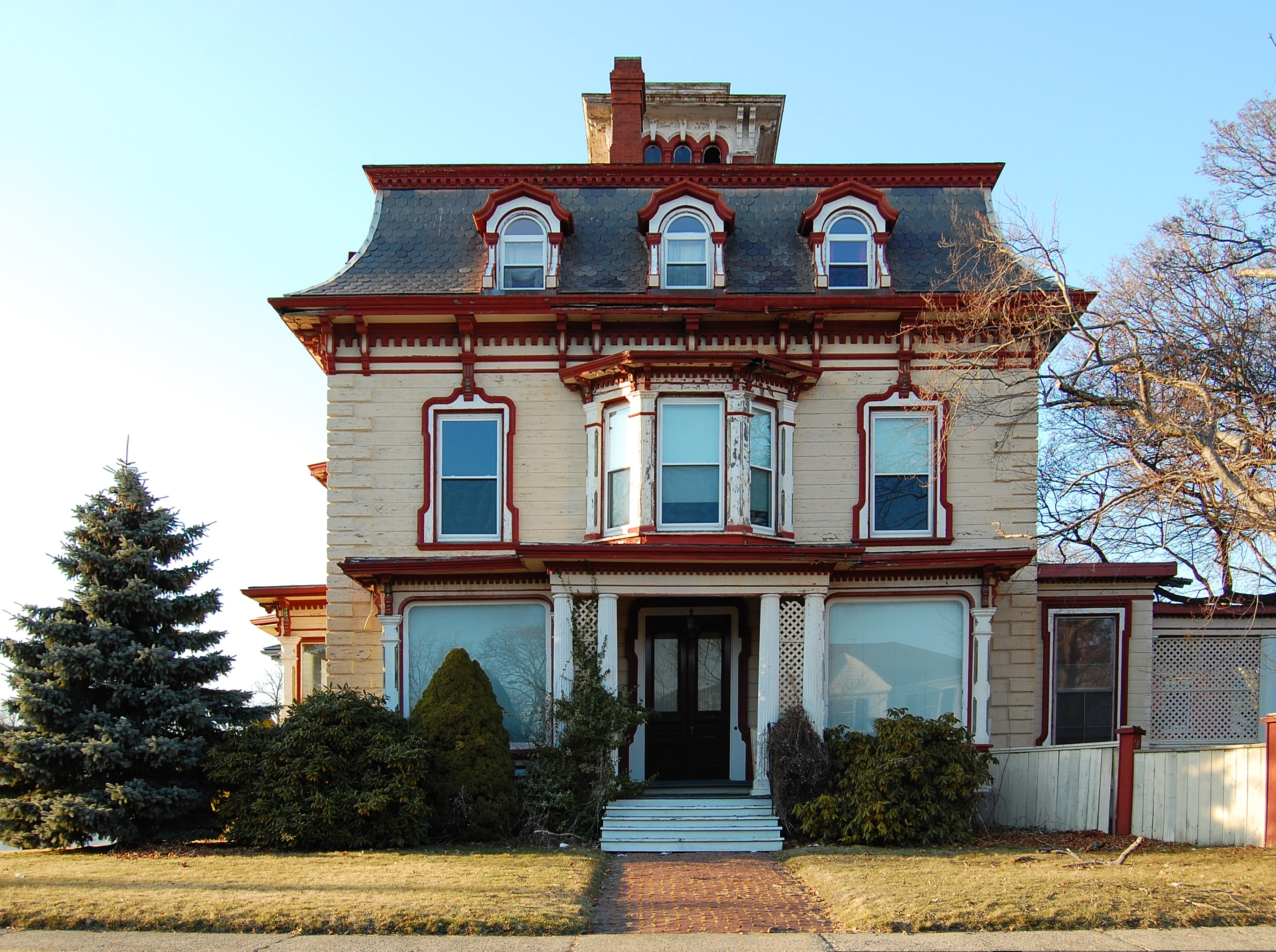
- Lucian Newhall house, in the Second Empire style

- Location within Massachusetts Location within the United States
- Location: 84 Nahant St., Lynn, Massachusetts
- Coordinates: 42°27′39″N 70°56′12″W
- Built: 1866
- Architectural style: Second Empire
- Part of: Diamond Historic District (ID96001040)
- NRHP reference No.: 85001576

Significant dates
- Added to NRHP: July 18, 1985
- Designated CP: November 22, 1996

The Lucian Newhall House is a historic house in Lynn, Massachusetts. Built in 1866 for a prominent local businessman, it is a high-quality example of Second Empire architecture. It was listed on the National Register of Historic Places (as being at 281 Ocean Street) in 1985, and included in the Diamond Historic District in 1996.

== Description and history ==
The Lucian Newhall House stands in Lynn's Diamond District, a residential area where the city's elite lived during the period of historical significance. The house stands at the northeast corner of Nahant and Ocean Streets, presenting finished facades to both streets.

It is a 2 1/2-story wood-frame structure, with a flared mansard roof. At the center of the roof is a square cupola with three round-arch windows on each side, and a broad-eaved hip-roof with an elaborate bracketed cornice. The building corners have wooden block quoining, and eaves—like those of the cupola—adorned with an elaborated bracketed cornice. The house's Nahant Street facade is three bays wide, with single-story projecting bays flanking a center entrance. The entrance is sheltered by an elaborate porch, which is joined to the roofs of the flanking bays and topped by a third projecting bay. Dormers with elaborate window-surrounds encompass round-arch windows, the center of which has a double window and is recessed. The Ocean Street facade of the house has a similar plan and decoration, but its ground-floor bays are rectangular, and its three roof dormers identical.

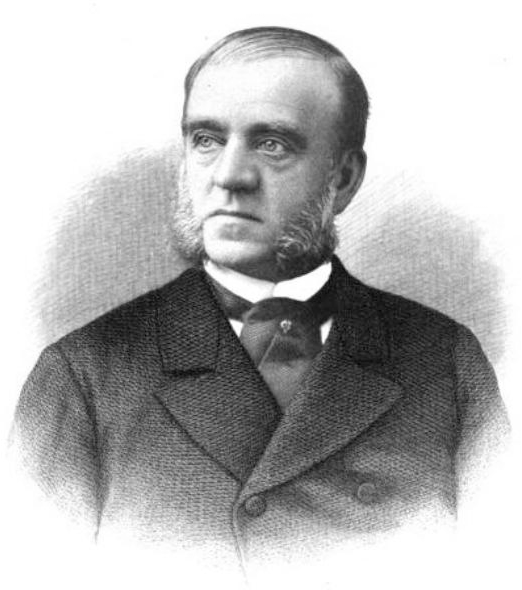
Lucian Newhall

The house was built in 1866 for Lucian Newhall (October 14, 1824 – May 17, 1898), a descendant of early Lynn settlers. Newhall was one of the first local businessmen to establish a shoe factory in the city's Central Business District (in 1847), and remained in the shoe business until 1875. Newhall's house is one of the most visually prominent in the Diamond District.

== See also ==
- National Register of Historic Places listings in Lynn, Massachusetts
- National Register of Historic Places listings in Essex County, Massachusetts

== Notes ==
A common misspelling of "Lucian" is as "Lucien".
