= H.R. Reed House =

Historic house in Massachusetts, United States

- U.S. National Register of Historic Places
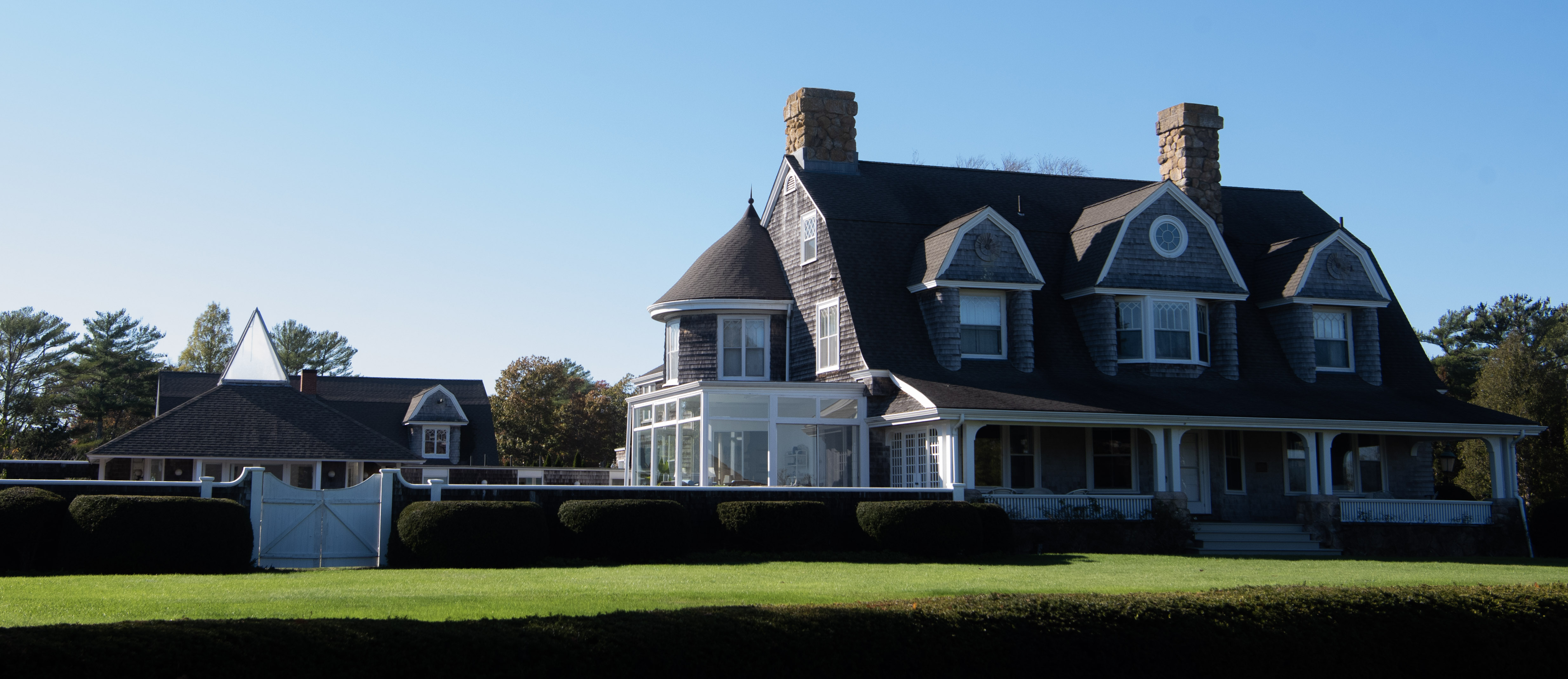

- Location within Massachusetts Location within the United States
- Location: 46 Water St., Marion, Massachusetts
- Coordinates: 41°41′58″N 70°45′24″W
- Area: 1.75 acres (0.71 ha)
- Built: 1886
- Architect: James T. Kelley
- Architectural style: Shingle style
- NRHP reference No.: 100004738
- Added to NRHP: December 2, 2019

The H.R. Reed House is a historic house at 46 Water Street in Marion, Massachusetts. Built in 1886, it is a good example of a Shingle style summer cottage. In 1890 and 1891, it was rented for the summer season by former United States President Grover Cleveland. The house was listed on the National Register of Historic Places in 2006.

== Description and history ==
The H.R. Reed House is located south of Marion's town center, on the west side Water Street just north of Holmes Street. It is separated from the street by a broad lawn and a low hedge. It is a two-story wood-frame structure, with a gambrel roof and shingled exterior. A single-story shed-roof porch extends across the front, supported by clusters of round columns. The roof is pierced by three gambrel-roof dormers, the center one larger than the other two. The outer dormers have sash windows flanked by vertical stone columns, while the center one has a three-part bay window, also with flanking stone columns. The interior retains many original and elegant features, including a large Queen Anne fireplace in its great hall, a double staircase, and an elliptical dining room.

The house was designed by James T. Kelley and built in 1886. In 1890 and 1891 it was rented by Grover Cleveland, then in between his two terms as President of the United States. It was purchased about 1892 by Henry R. Reed, an agent for the Revere Sugar Company of Boston. Reed is credited with transforming the interior to its present Colonial Revival elegance, and for the two-story turret at the rear of the house. The house remained in the Reed family through the 1940s. It is considered one of the finest examples of summer cottage architecture in Marion, and is the only one known to retain a period carriage barn.

== See also ==
- National Register of Historic Places listings in Plymouth County, Massachusetts
