= Brewster Memorial Hall =

- U.S. National Register of Historic Places
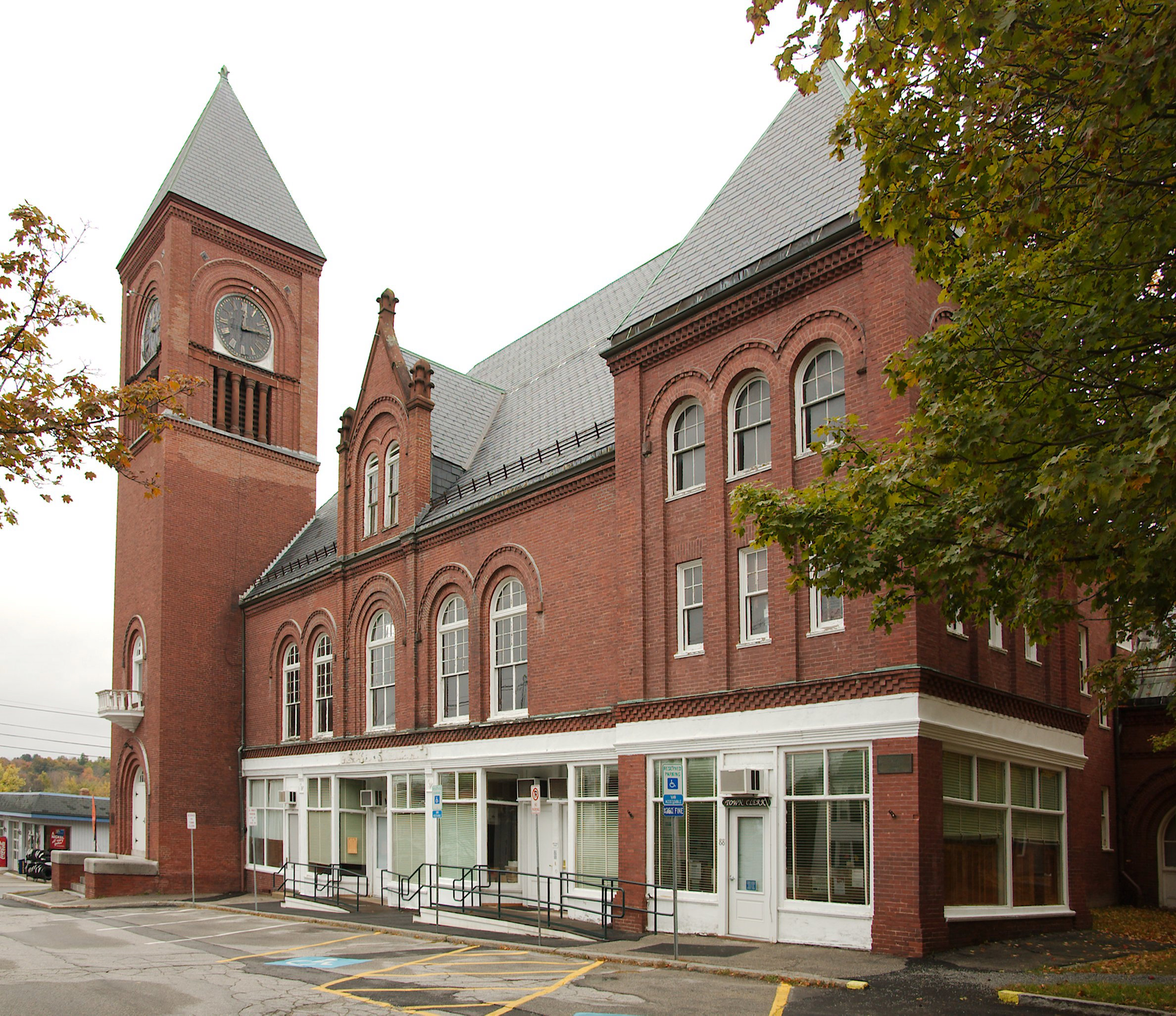

- Location within New Hampshire Location within the United States
- Location: S. Main and Union Sts., Wolfeboro, New Hampshire
- Coordinates: 43°35′5″N 71°12′37″W
- Area: 0.8 acres (0.32 ha)
- Built: 1888
- Architect: James T. Kelley
- Architectural style: Romanesque
- NRHP reference No.: 83001129
- Added to NRHP: September 8, 1983

Brewster Memorial Hall is the town hall of Wolfeboro, New Hampshire. It is located at the junction of South Main Street and Union Street in the town center. Its construction in 1880-90 was the result of a bequest from Wolfeboro native John W. Brewster, with terms stipulating that the building should resemble Sargent Hall in Merrimac, Massachusetts. It was listed on the National Register of Historic Places in 1983.

== Description and history ==
Brewster Memorial Hall is prominently located in the center of Wolfeboro village, at the northeast corner of South Main and Union Streets. It is a roughly L-shaped brick building, with a two-story main block and a single-story ell projecting north. A two-story turreted section projects east of the main block, and the building's most prominent feature, a 101-foot (31 m) tower, projects from the southwest corner. The building's Romanesque styling includes round-arch windows on the second level of the Main Street facade and on tower windows, and open colonnades in the upper level of the tower below its clock faces. The clocks and colonnade are set in recessed round-arch panels, and the tower is topped by a pyramidal roof.

Boston architect James T. Kelley designed Brewster Hall to satisfy the terms of a bequest by John W. Brewster, a Wolfeboro native and philanthropist. Brewster, who also left major bequests for area private academies, stipulated that the building resemble a similar one in Merrimac, Massachusetts, and that it provided retail spaces, facilities for town offices, and a public library. Kelley met these terms, styling it in the Romanesque Revival rather than the more Gothic styling of Sargent Hall. It was completed at a cost reported to be about $50,000.

The retail spaces and library are now gone, leaving just Town offices and a large meeting room on the second floor. Major rebuilding and repair was carried out in 2019 and 2020 bringing the old building back into shape and meeting building code. The clock in the tower still requires winding by hand and is usually done by a town employee.

All town meetings and voting takes place in the meeting room on the second floor.

== See also ==
- National Register of Historic Places listings in Carroll County, New Hampshire
