= Another Course to College =

Coordinates: 42.265228°N 71.117445°W

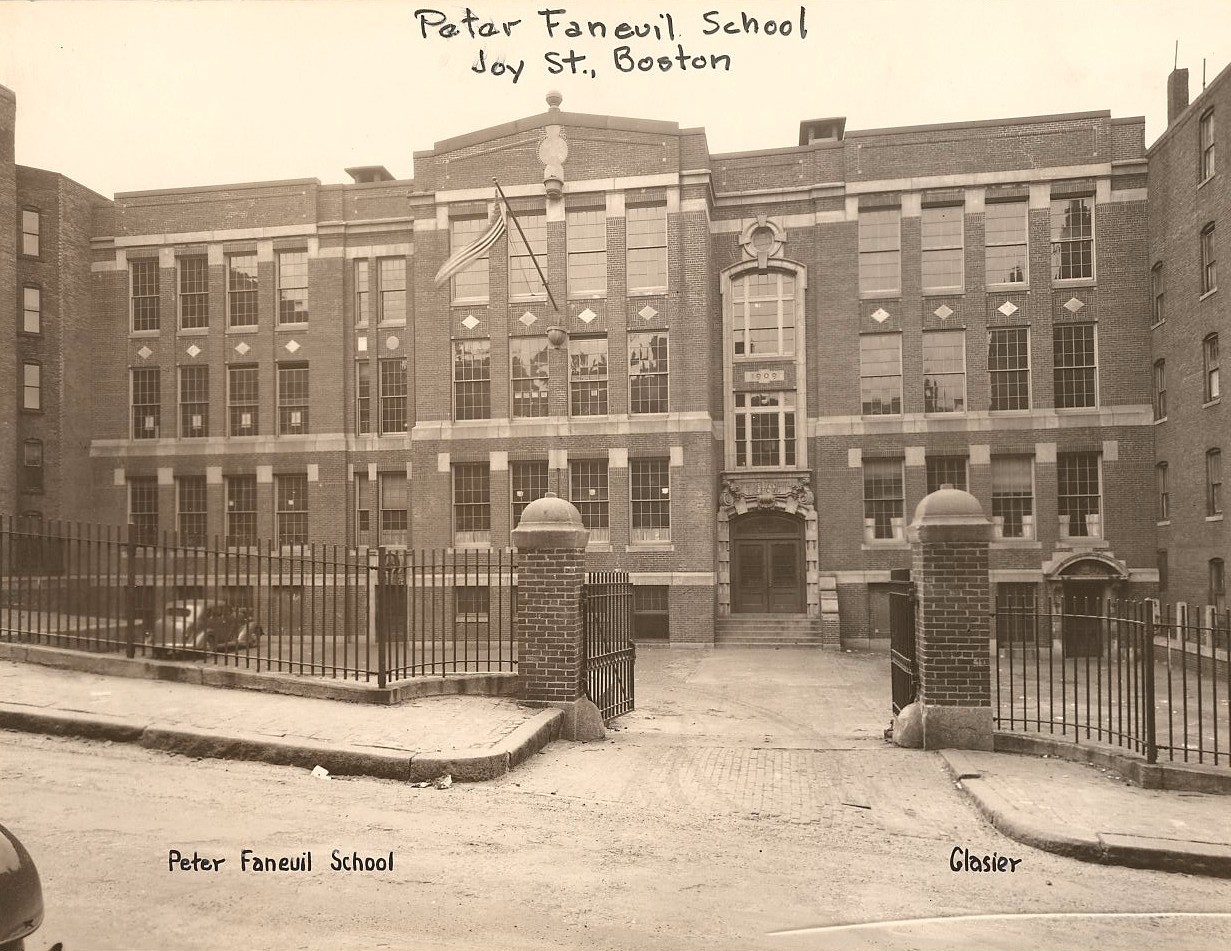
- Former home of Another Course to College (ACC), 1976–1989

Location
- 612 Metropolitan Avenue; Hyde Park, Massachusetts; United States

Information
- Type: Pilot
- Established: 1976
- School district: Boston Public Schools
- CEEB code: 220336
- NCES School ID: 250279000698
- Head of School: Demitri Curry (interim)
- Grades: 9–12
- Enrollment: 244 (2025–26)
- Campus type: Urban
- Athletics conference: Boston City League
- Website: https://accbps.org

Another Course to College (ACC) is a public pilot school located in Hyde Park, Boston, Massachusetts, United States.

== History ==
In 1976 the Peter Faneuil School, located in Boston's Beacon Hill neighborhood, changed use and housed a joint transitional studies program of the Boston Public Schools and the University of Massachusetts named Another Course To College, commonly known by the acronym ACC. The program provided two years of traditional and intensive college preparatory work covering a student's junior and senior years, designed to provide students with an option to the curriculum, instructional style and organizational structure present within the regular school program. Admission was based on GPA, IQ based entrance exam, and/or teacher recommendation. Students entered the program through their assigned (home) school's "flexible campus program" and maintained enrollment there, receiving their diploma from the home school upon graduation. ACC students received UMASS I.D. cards, and were official members of the UMASS-Boston student body. Courses taken by the students at UMASS received high school and college credits. After its first year, 86 of 88 seniors who applied for college admission were accepted.

After the ACC/UMASS program funding was cut the building closed and converted into apartments. In its first of many moves, ACC held classes in the basement of Hyde Park High School in Hyde Park, Boston starting in the 1989–1990 school year. The Peter Faneuil School was added to the National Register of Historic Places on December 16, 1994.

ACC was approved as a Boston pilot school in June, 2003. In that year, ACC added 9th grade and transitioned from being an alternative program to a four-year pilot high school. The 2004–2005 school year marked ACC's first year as a full high school enrolling students in grades 9–12.

In November 2025, Boston Public Schools superintendent Mary Skipper proposed the closure of ACC along with two other Boston schools in 2027. On December 17, 2025, the Boston School Committee voted to close ACC (along with 2 additional schools) at the conclusion of the 2026–27 school year.

== Heads of School ==
- John M. Regan (1976–1980)
- John F. Best (1980–1987)
- Curtis D. Wells (1987–1990)
- Marilyn Hurwitz (1990–1995)
- Marilyn Corsini (1995–2001)
- Gerald Howland (2001–2007)
- Rachel Skerritt (2007–2009)
- Lisa Gilbert-Smith (2009–2015)
- Michele Pellam (2015–2025)
- Demitri Curry (2025–) (interim)

== Locations ==
- 60 Joy Street, Beacon Hill (1976–1989)
- 655 Metropolitan Avenue, Hyde Park (1989–1993)
- 320 Newbury Street, Boston (1993–1998)
- 989 Commonwealth Avenue, Boston (1998–2004)
- 20 Warren Street, Brighton (2004–2016)
- 612 Metropolitan Avenue, Hyde Park (2016–present)
