= Charles Lovejoy House =

Historic house in Massachusetts, United States

- U.S. National Register of Historic Places
- U.S. Historic district – Contributing property
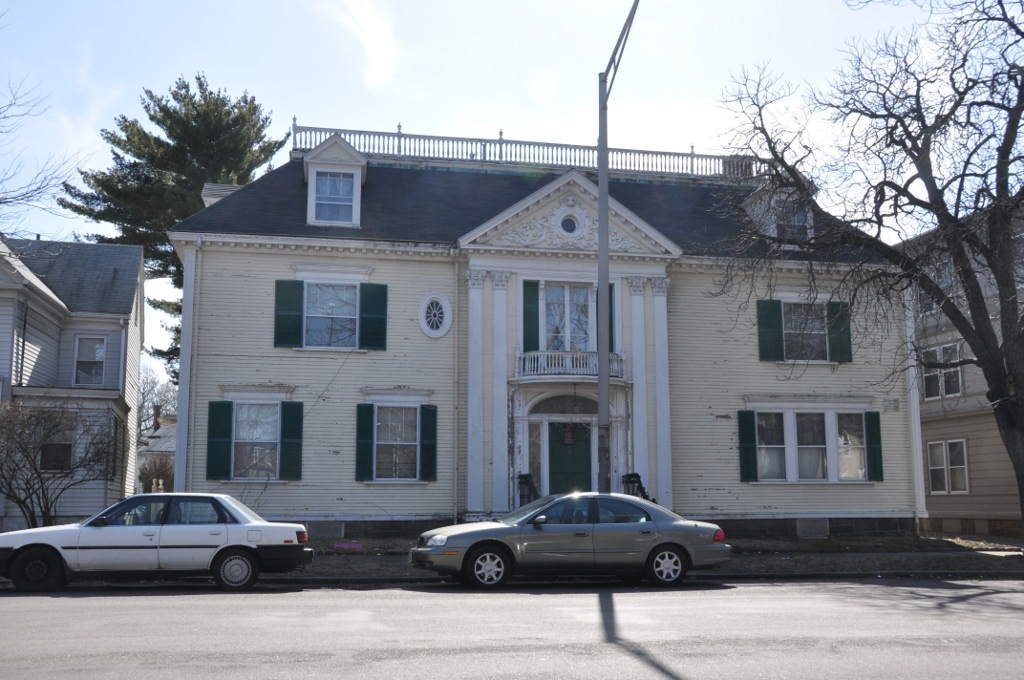

- Location within Massachusetts Location within the United States
- Location: Lynn, Massachusetts
- Coordinates: 42.46356°N 70.93751°W
- Built: 1893
- Architect: James T. Kelley
- Architectural style: Colonial Revival
- Part of: Diamond Historic District
- NRHP reference No.: 78000454

Significant dates
- Added to NRHP: November 28, 1978
- Designated CP: November 22, 1996

The Charles Lovejoy House is a historic house at 64 Broad Street in Lynn, Massachusetts. The 2 1/2-story Colonial Revival mansion was built in 1893 for Doctor Charles Lovejoy, one of the founders of Lynn Hospital. It features a Palladian entrance with pilasters topped by a triangular pediment surrounding a recessed entry. The entry is flanked by wings that have two windows on the first floor, one on the second, and then gable-dormered windows at the top.

The house was listed on the National Register of Historic Places in 1978, and was included in the Diamond Historic District in 1996.

== See also ==
- National Register of Historic Places listings in Lynn, Massachusetts
- National Register of Historic Places listings in Essex County, Massachusetts
