= Diamond Historic District (Lynn, Massachusetts) =

Historic district in Massachusetts, United States

- U.S. National Register of Historic Places
- U.S. Historic district
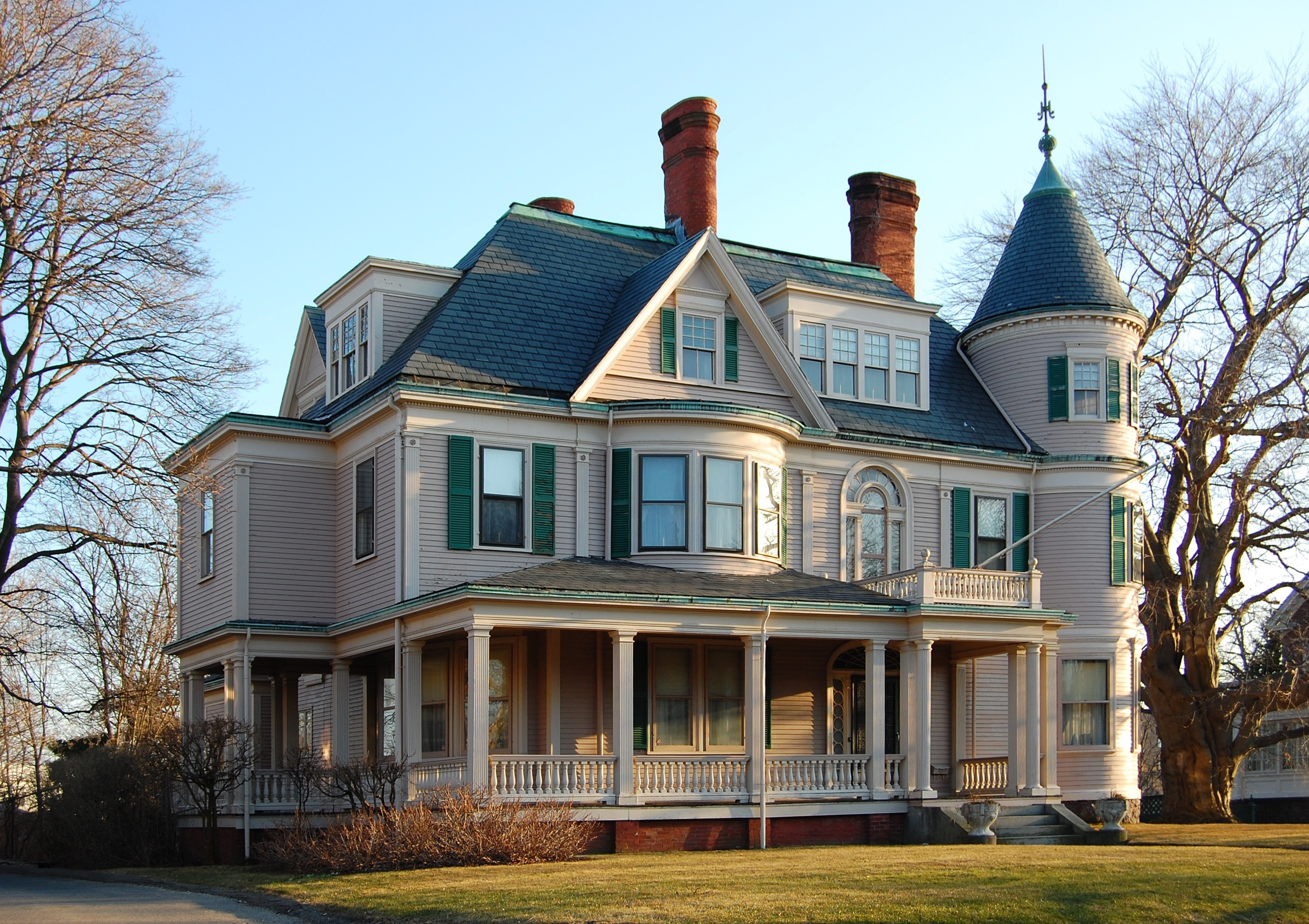
- A large Victorian home in Lynn's Diamond District

- Location within Massachusetts Location within the United States
- Location: Lynn, Massachusetts
- Coordinates: 42°27′38″N 70°55′58″W
- Built: 1837
- Architect: Betts, Thomas; Bixbee, C.A., et al.
- Architectural style: Federal, Greek Revival, Gothic Revival
- NRHP reference No.: 96001040
- Added to NRHP: October 10, 1996

The Diamond Historic District is a seaside, 69.5-acre (28.1 ha) National Register historic district in Lynn, Massachusetts. Established by the National Park Service in 1996, the district is situated between downtown Lynn and the Atlantic Ocean—bounded roughly by Broad and Lewis Streets to the north, Lynn Shore Drive to the southeast, Nahant Street to the west, and Eastern Avenue to the east. The Diamond Historic District encompasses 590 contributing resources.

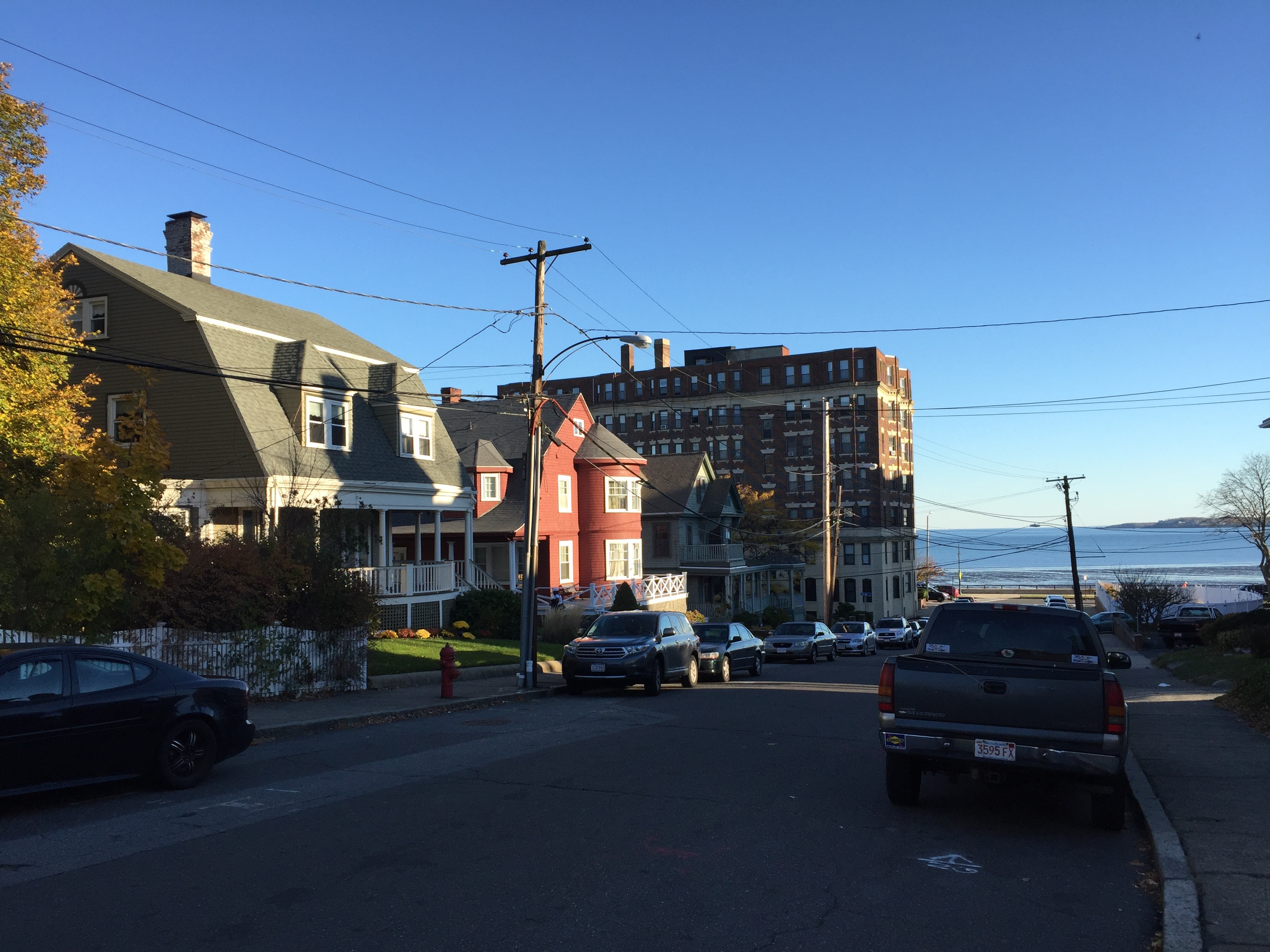
Wave Street

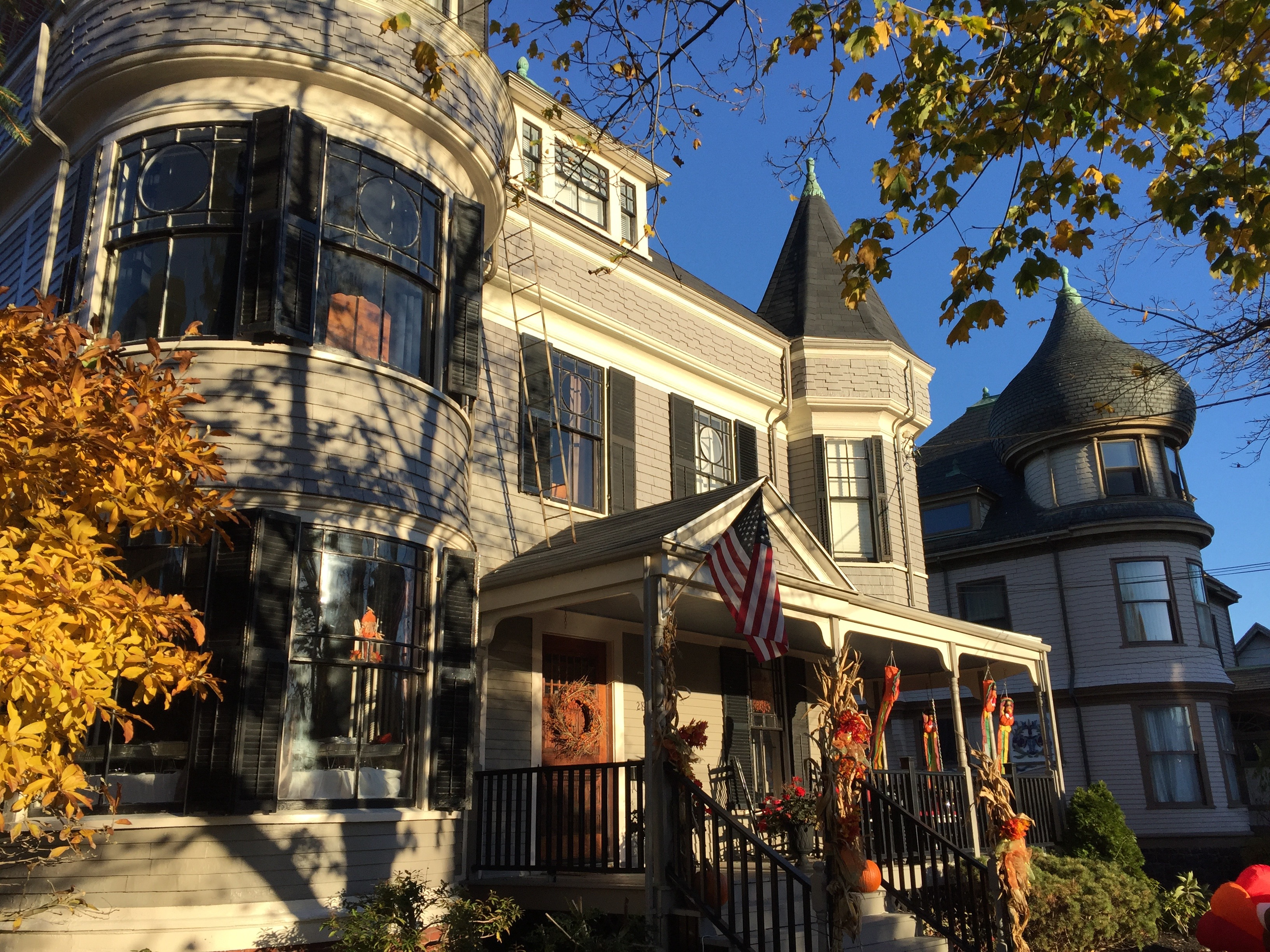
Atlantic Street

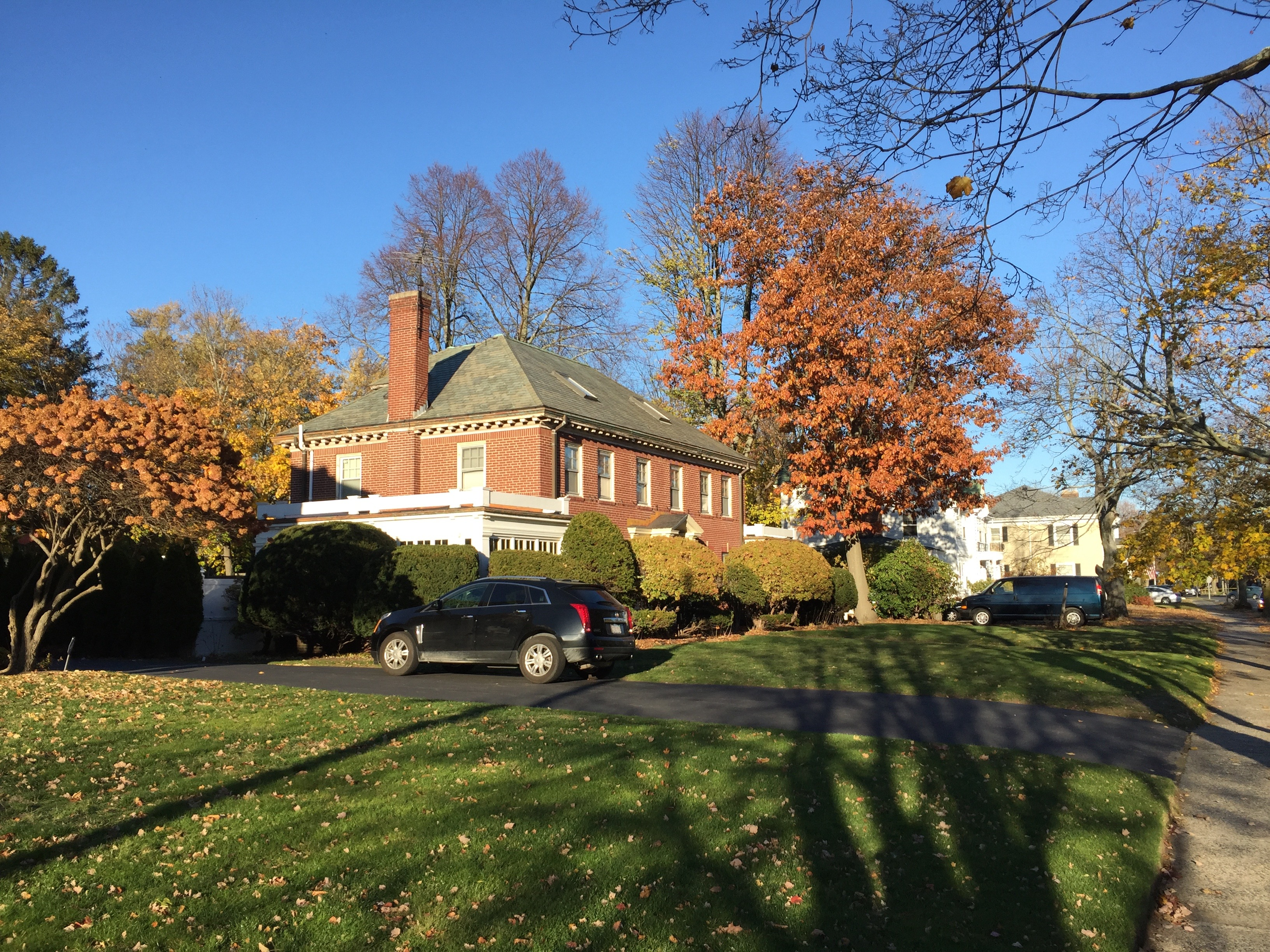
Ocean Avenue

Although the Washington Square section of the Diamond Historic District—which is arrayed along Broad Street—was first settled by Europeans in the 1630s, the oldest surviving structure in the Diamond District is the c. 1825 Daniel Newhall House. Most of the District's earliest surviving houses are conservative, 2.5-story, center-chimney Federal buildings, but several Greek Revival structures also are extant.

The Diamond District was substantially developed after 1840, when the area became a fashionable coastal summer resort. Accordingly, mid- and late-19th century architectural styles dominate. The style best represented is Colonial Revival, with numerous exemplars built between 1890 and 1940—notably the Charles Lovejoy House, which was added to the National Register in 1978. A significant number of Italianate, Queen Anne, and Second Empire houses also are present, including the Lucian Newhall House, which was added to the National Register in 1985. The American Shingle Style also is well represented.

Although predominantly residential, the Diamond District includes a handful of commercial buildings, which are located on Broad and Lewis Streets. The District also includes four religious structures, the oldest being a Quaker meetinghouse, built c. 1825. The other three religious structures—two churches and one synagogue—date to the early decades of the 20th century.

== See also ==
- National Register of Historic Places listings in Lynn, Massachusetts
- National Register of Historic Places listings in Essex County, Massachusetts
