= Peter Faneuil =

American merchant, slave trader and philanthropist (1700–1743)

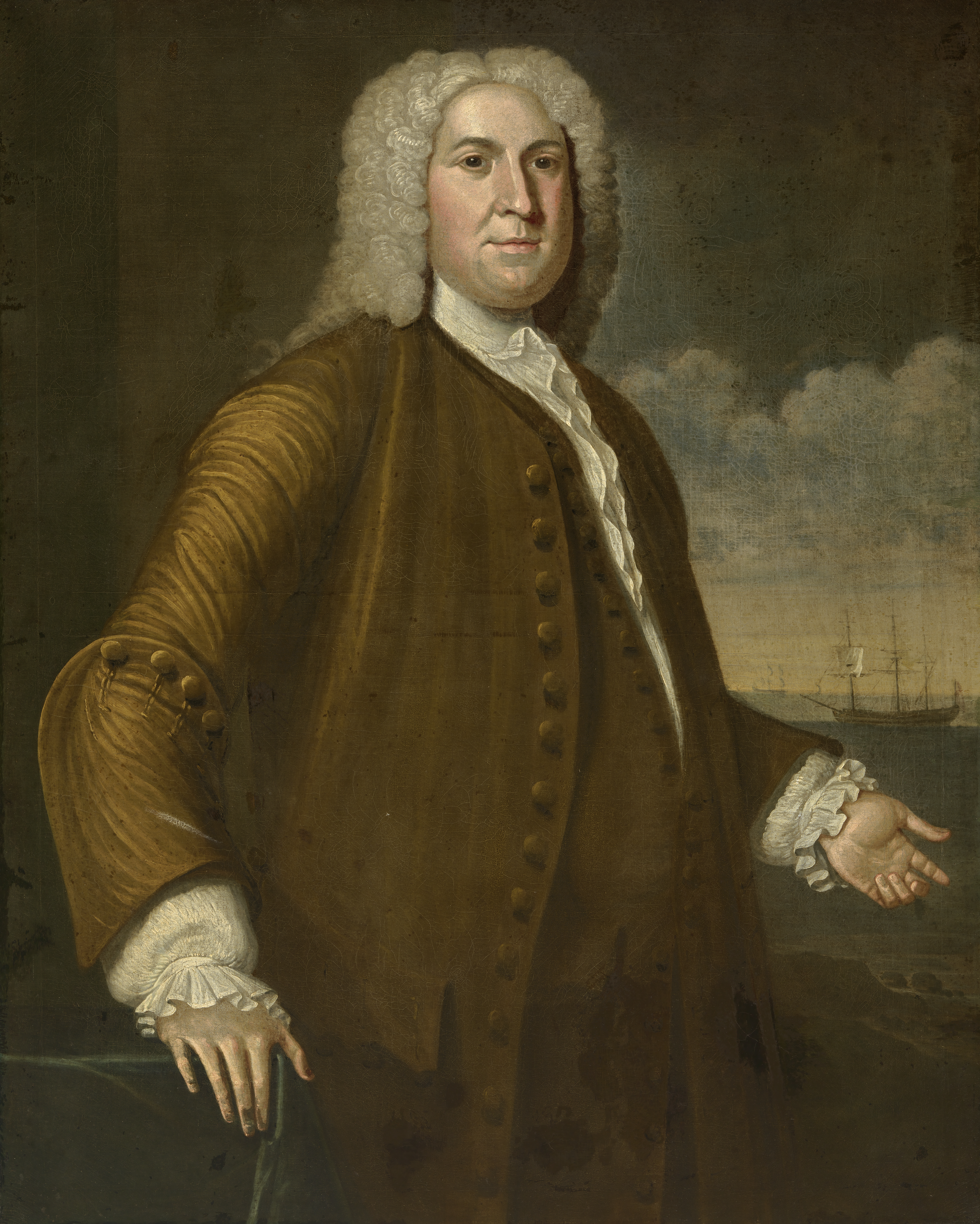
- Portrait by John Smibert, c. 1742
- Born: June 20, 1700; New Rochelle, New York
- Died: March 3, 1743 (aged 42); Boston, Massachusetts
- Occupations: Merchant, slave trader

Peter Faneuil (traditionally /ˈfʌnəl/; French: [fɑnœj]; June 20, 1700 – March 3, 1743) was an American merchant, slave trader and philanthropist best known for his role in the construction of Faneuil Hall in Boston.

== Early life ==
Peter Faneuil was born on June 20, 1700, in New Rochelle, New York, to Benjamin Faneuil and Anne Bureau, the eldest child of one of three Huguenot brothers who fled France with considerable wealth after the 1685 revocation of the Edict of Nantes. Having emigrated to America about a decade earlier and become freemen of Massachusetts Bay in 1691, Peter's father, Benjamin, and his uncle, Andrew, had subsequently been early settlers of New Rochelle. Shortly thereafter, Andrew made Boston his permanent residence. Benjamin married Anne Bureau in 1699, and they had at least two sons and three daughters who lived to maturity.

Little is known of Peter's boyhood. His father, prominent and fairly well-to-do, died in 1719 when Peter was 18, and soon Peter, his brother, Benjamin Jr., and his sister Mary moved to Boston. Their widowed, childless uncle Andrew had become one of New England's wealthiest men through shrewd trading and Boston real estate investments. Andrew may have formally adopted his two nephews. Peter Faneuil's first claim to fame occurred in 1728 when he helped his brother-in-law Henry Phillips escape to France after he killed Benjamin Woodbridge in the first duel ever to take place in Boston.

== Life as a merchant ==
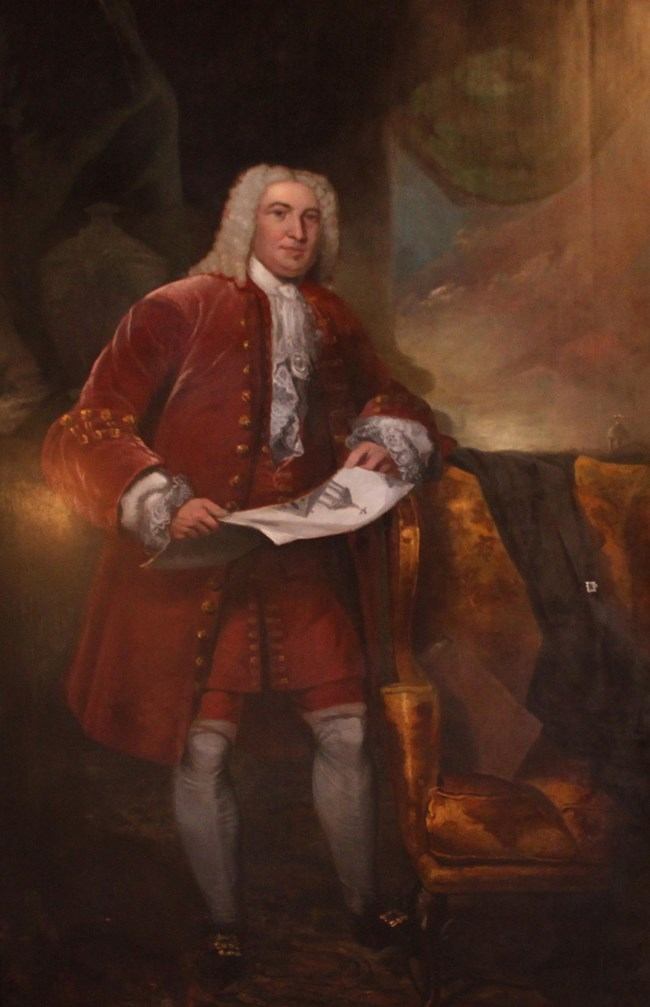
1807 copy by Henry Sargent of a 1742 portrait of Faneuil by John Smibert

Faneuil entered Boston's commission and shipping business and soon proved a competent trader, assisting his uncle in running a lucrative mercantile establishment that traded with Antigua, Barbados, Spain, the Canary Islands, and England, only a few of the places from which Faneuil's correspondence survives. Prominent in the triangular trade, Peter shipped slaves to the West Indies and brought molasses and sugar to British America. He handled merchandise from Europe and the Caribbean, exported rum, fish, and produce, and engaged in shipbuilding. When he ventured both ship and cargo in transatlantic or coastal commerce, he customarily shared the risk with others. Charging 5% for handling consignments, he used advanced business methods and kept careful records. Fishing-grounds agents kept him informed of market prices and furthered his commercial connections. Not all of his trade was legal. When in 1736 his ship Providence was seized for exchanging fish and oil for French gold, he complained that only the "caprice" of the admiralty judge, a "Vile" man, was responsible for "Impositions" on a "fair trader" that was "in no way founded on law and justice."

A childless widower, Andrew Faneuil for some reason threatened to disinherit either of his two nephews if they married. Benjamin Jr. preferred wedlock to a share of the enormous Faneuil fortune, which in addition to ships, shops, and a mansion in Tremont Street included £14,000 in East India Company stock. During his uncle's final illness Peter managed Andrew's business as well as his own. Peter, who was swarthy, stocky, and disabled since childhood, remained single, inheriting most of the fortune. Peter became—despite handsome bequests to his sisters—one of America's wealthiest men, living sumptuously in a Beacon Street mansion. Writing to his London partners to inform them of his uncle's death, he also requested five pipes of Madeira wine: "As this wine is for the use of my house, I hope you will be careful that I have the best." Soon thereafter, he requested a "handsome chariot" emblazoned with the family crest, accompanied by a coachman unlikely "to be debauched with strong drink, rum, etc." as were most European servants. He also asked for "the latest, best book of the several sorts of cookery, which pray let be of the largest characters, for the benefit of the maid's reading."

== Faneuil Hall and other gifts ==
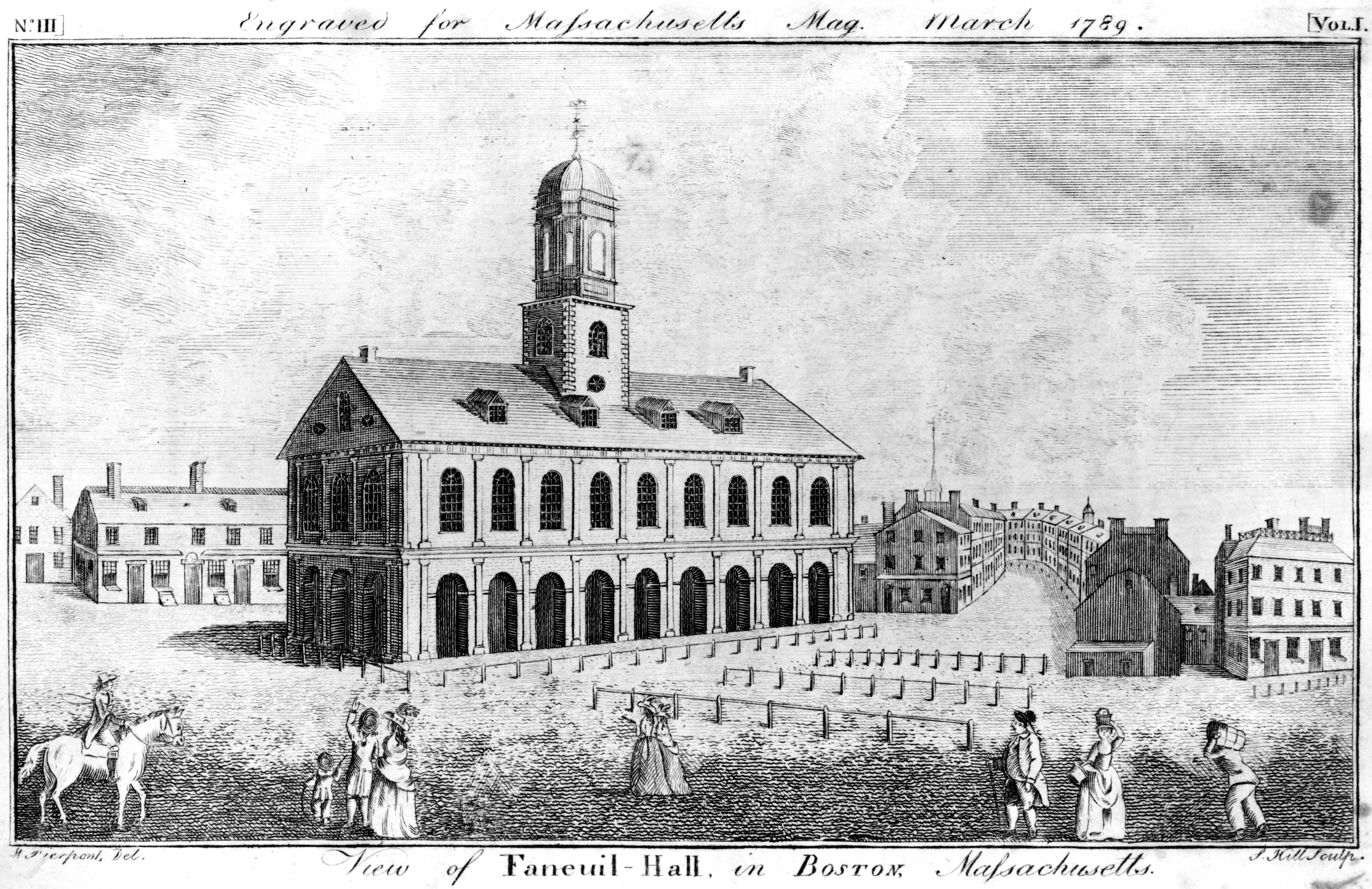
Faneuil Hall in 1789

Most noteworthy was Faneuil's gift to the town of Boston of Faneuil Hall, which opened in September 1742, scarcely six months before his death. In July 1740 Faneuil had offered the town a large market building. This offer was by no means uncontroversial: Bostonians had debated throughout the eighteenth century whether a centralized market was preferable to peddling in the streets, bringing conveniences such as home delivery but also inconveniences including noisy push-cart hucksters and higher prices. Markets built by the town had been destroyed by a mob disguised as clergymen in 1737. Only by a vote of 367 to 360 did the Boston Town Meeting accept Faneuil's offer. The building took two years to construct and was named for Faneuil after his death. It was gutted by fire in March 1761; the walls remained, but the interior structure, to which the town meeting frequently adjourned to protest British policy as the American Revolution approached, was added after the fire. The room above the market stalls became a civic center where so many prerevolutionary meetings were held that Faneuil Hall became known as America's "Cradle of Liberty." Faneuil Hall still stands, although it is dwarfed by the Quincy Market complex built behind it in the nineteenth century.

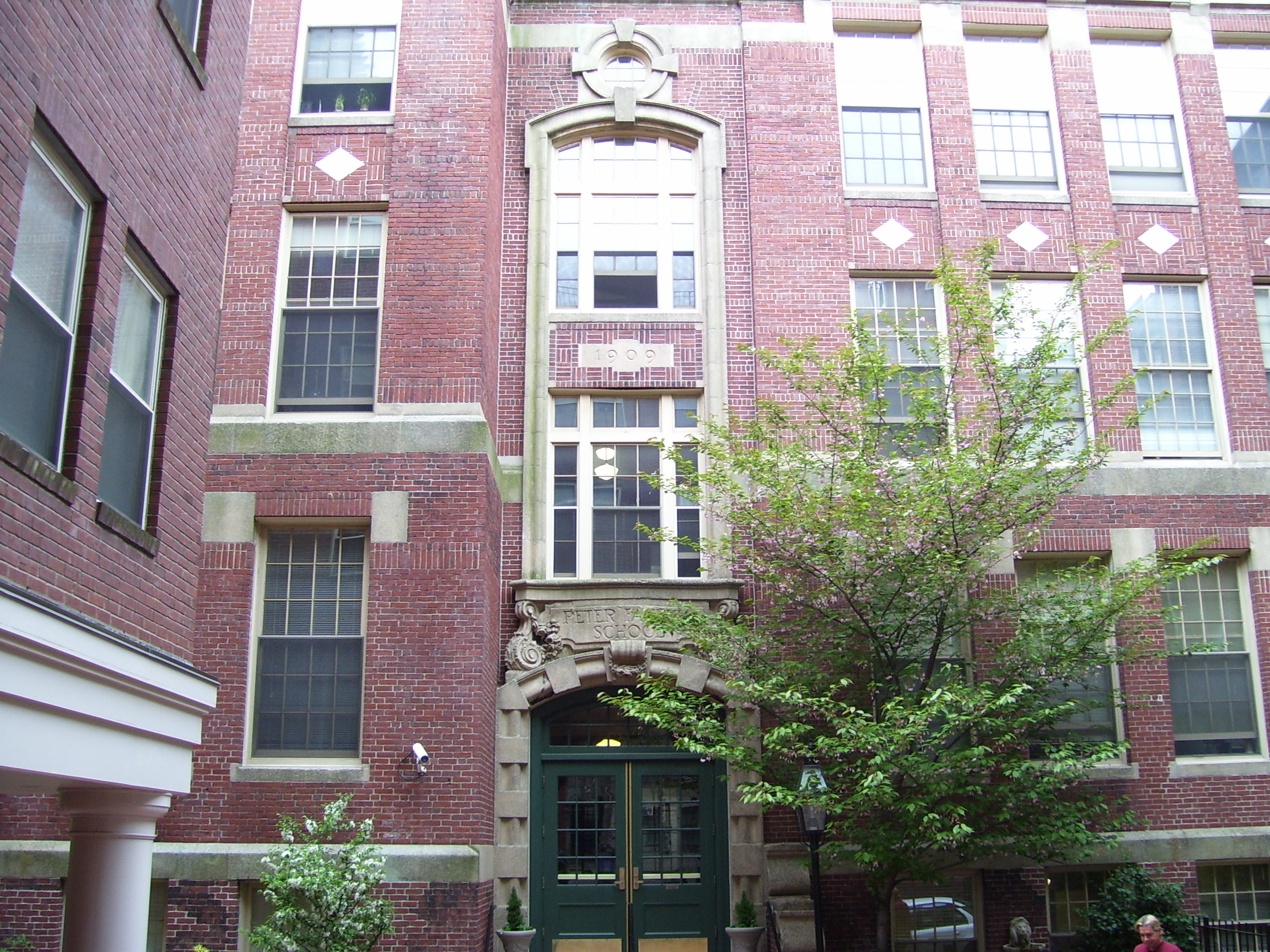
Peter Faneuil School on Boston's Beacon Hill is named after Faneuil

Although Faneuil enjoyed the good life, his contemporaries and posterity honor him most highly as a public benefactor. John Lovell, who gave his funeral eulogy, said that Faneuil "fed the hungry and he cloathed the naked, he comforted the fatherless, and the widows in their affliction." An obituary noted that he was "a gentleman, possessed of a very ample fortune and a most generous spirit," his "noble benefaction to his town and constant employment of a great number of tradesmen, artificers, and laborers, to whom he was a liberal paymaster . . . made his life a public blessing, and his death a general loss." In Faneuil's case such praise was more than routine kindness to the recently deceased. He donated liberally to the Episcopal Charitable Society, an endowment for the families of the deceased clergymen of Trinity Church, to which he belonged, and was treasurer of the project to build the present King's Chapel. Other wealthy Boston Anglicans apparently lacked his fervor, for the project languished for five years after his death following his gift of £200 sterling.

Evidently little is known of Faneuil's treatment of his own slaves, only that he engaged in a trade that was lawful at the time.

== Death ==
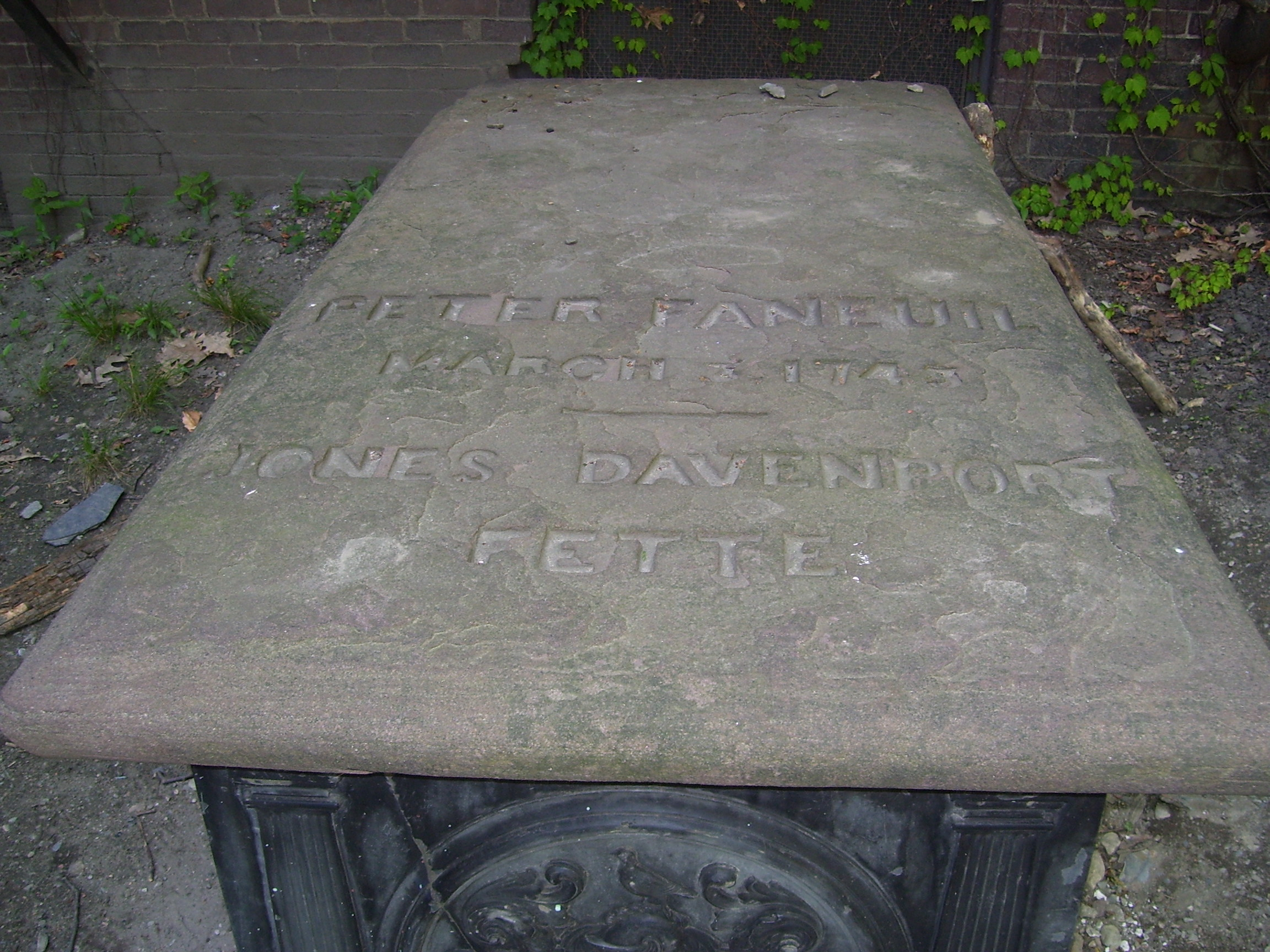
Faneuil's tomb in the Granary Burying Ground

Faneuil died unmarried in Boston of dropsy on March 3, 1743, at the age of 42. He was interred in the Granary Burying Ground. He left his fortune, including five enslaved black people and 195 dozen bottles of wine, to his sister Mary and brother Benjamin Jr. (who was later to become a Loyalist in the American Revolution). 19th-century American historian Lucius M. Sargent said of Faneuil that he "lived as magnificently as a nobleman, as hospitably as a bishop, and as charitably as an apostle."

== Bibliography ==
- Brown, Abram English (1900). Faneuil Hall and Faneuil Hall Market: Peter Faneuil and His Gift. Boston: Lee & Shepard. pp. 22–50.
