= Peter Faneuil School =

- U.S. National Register of Historic Places
- U.S. National Historic Landmark District – Contributing property
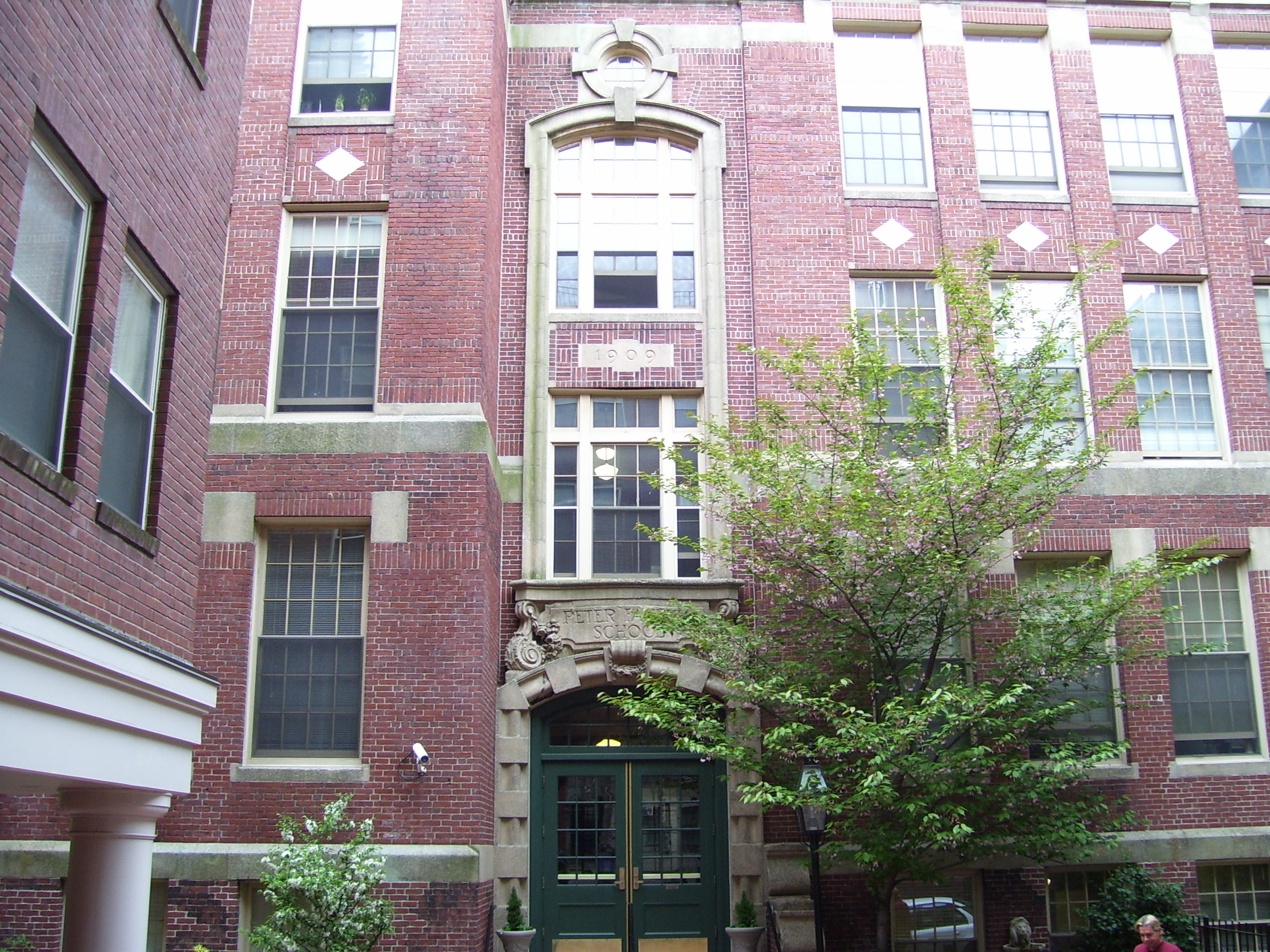

- Location within Boston Location within Massachusetts Location within the United States
- Location: Boston, Massachusetts
- Coordinates: 42°21′37″N 71°3′58″W
- Built: 1909
- Architect: James T. Kelley; Harold S. Graves
- Architectural style: Tudor Revival, Classical Revival
- Part of: Beacon Hill Historic District (ID66000130)
- NRHP reference No.: 94001492

Significant dates
- Added to NRHP: December 16, 1994
- Designated NHLDCP: October 15, 1966

The Peter Faneuil School is an historic school building at 60 Joy Street on Beacon Hill in Boston, Massachusetts. It is a four-story brick Tudor Revival building with limestone trim, built in 1910 to designs by the Boston architect James T. Kelley and his associate, Harold S. Graves. It is named for Peter Faneuil, the benefactor who gave Faneuil Hall to the city.

== History ==
=== Construction ===
The erection of the Peter Faneuil School represented an early form of urban renewal, as the area it occupies was cleared of wooden tenement housing for its construction. During most of the twentieth century school served as an elementary school for Beacon Hill and West End residents. It was the last school which serviced the Old West End neighborhood to close.

=== The LAB School ===
In 1975, the Educational Collaborative of Greater Boston (EDCO) opened The LAB (Learning about Boston) School, as a voluntary desegregation secondary school project. Seventy-five high-school students from 22 different school districts chose to attend the program which was based on a handful of majors chosen by the students, Students could opt for Dramatic Arts, Communications, Marine Biology, Environmental Studies. Adventure and History, in addition to taking elective and required courses in traditional and not so traditional subjects. At the start of each semester, students and staff spent several days at Boston University's Sargent Camp Outdoor Adventure Program to get to know one another and to participate in trust-building activities. Outdoor adventure at LAB School included a notable rappel by the students down the front of the Peter Faneuil School building.

During its year and a half of existence, the students and staff published several volumes of an original, creative writing and art magazine, LAByrinths. The LAB School continued for another year as a full-time program, succeeding in creating genuine integration among students and staff. Attendance, even for the less-likely-to-succeed students was high, and reading scores soared. At its height of success, LAB School served 150 students. As state and federal funding for desegregation projects waned, LAB School ended. Several of the staff, including Bernice Lockhart, director, remained at the location, and transitioned into another, part-time EDCO project, called Metropathways.

=== Later uses ===
Between 1976 and 1989 the Peter Faneuil School changed use and housed a small college preparatory program sponsored by the University of Massachusetts named Another Course to College, or ACC. ACC, a 'back to basics' advanced program, was created as a safety net for academically strong and/or gifted students of the Boston public schools. Acceptance was based on GPA, IQ based entrance exam, and/or teacher recommendation.

=== Closing and reconversion ===
After the ACC/UMASS program was cut, the Peter Faneuil School closed. In 1994, the building was converted into apartments and expanded with a new brick façade along the Joy Street sidewalk, which turned its parking-lot forecourt into a central courtyard. Today it houses 20 affordable apartments for low-income people afflicted with the HIV/AIDS virus.

== Historical recognition ==
The Peter Faneuil School building was added to the National Register of Historic Places in 1994, and included in the Beacon Hill Historic District in 1966.

== See also ==
- National Register of Historic Places listings in northern Boston, Massachusetts
