= Richards Free Library =

- U.S. National Register of Historic Places
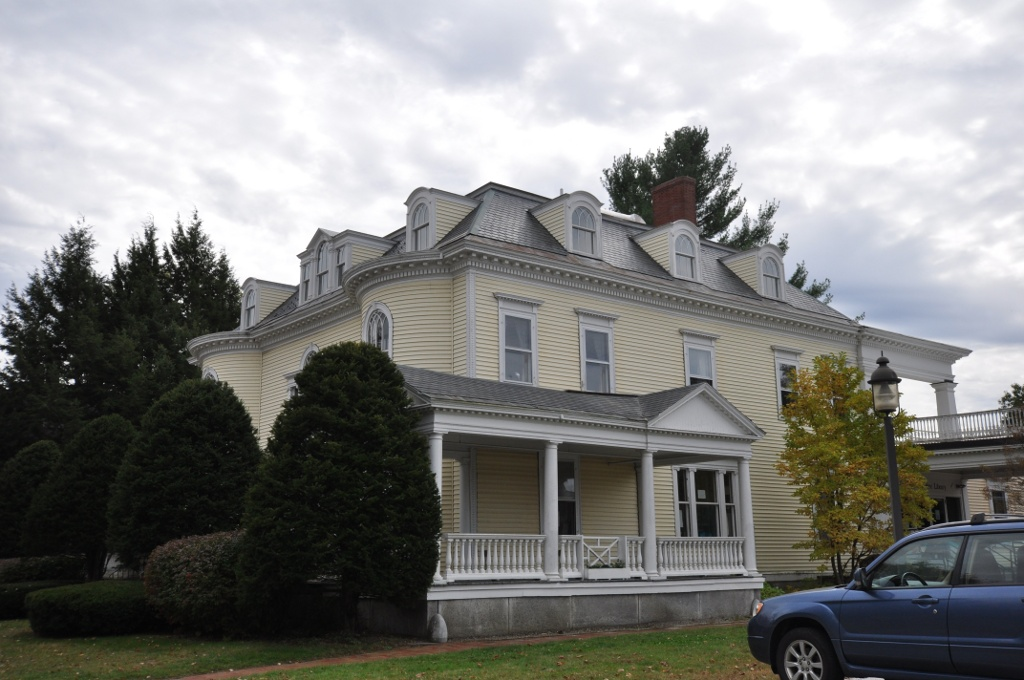

- Location within New Hampshire Location within the United States
- Location: 58 N. Main St., Newport, New Hampshire
- Coordinates: 43°22′0″N 72°10′34″W
- Area: 1.4 acres (0.57 ha)
- Built: 1898
- Built by: Hira Beckwith
- Architect: James T. Kelley
- Architectural style: Colonial Revival
- NRHP reference No.: 84003257
- Added to NRHP: September 7, 1984

The Seth Mason Richards House, housing the Richards Free Library and the Library Arts Center, is a historic house, public library, and art gallery at 58 North Main Street in Newport, New Hampshire. This three-story Colonial Revival house was designed by Boston, Massachusetts architect James T. Kelley and built in 1898-99 for Captain Seth Mason Richards, a scion of one of Newport's wealthiest families. The property, including the house and carriage house, were donated by his heirs for use as the town's public library in 1962. The library is housed in the main building, while the carriage house has been converted for use as a gallery space. The property was listed on the National Register of Historic Places (as "Richards Free Library") in 1984.

== History ==
The Richards family had a long history of prominence in local affairs. Dexter Richards, the father of Seth Mason Richards, owned the Dexter Mill, and had funded both the construction of a school and the establishment of the Richards Free Library in 1888. Seth Mason Richards was politically active, serving in the state legislature and its Governor's Council. His house is one of the finest examples of Colonial Revival architecture in the state, and was donated to the town as a home for the library by his daughter in 1963. The town took great care to maintain the architectural details of the building while adapting for its new use.

== See also ==
- National Register of Historic Places listings in Sullivan County, New Hampshire
