= Olmsted Subdivision Historic District =

Historic district in Massachusetts, United States

- U.S. National Register of Historic Places
- U.S. Historic district
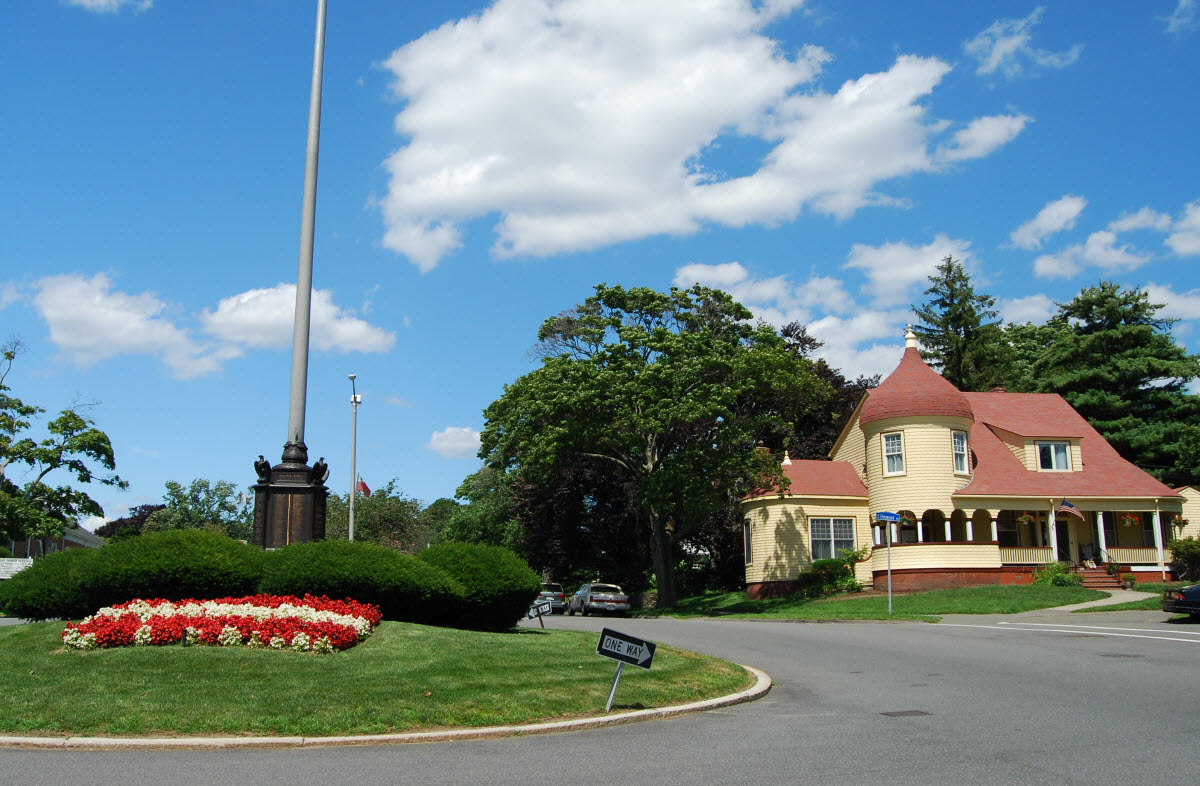

- Location within Massachusetts Location within the United States
- Location: Swampscott, Massachusetts
- Coordinates: 42°28′18″N 70°54′56″W
- Architect: Frederick Law Olmsted; Henry Vaughan et al.
- Architectural style: Queen Anne, Shingle Style
- NRHP reference No.: 02000696
- Added to NRHP: July 1, 2002

Olmsted Subdivision Historic District is a historic district roughly bounded by New Ocean St/Paradise Road, Swampscott Avenue, Redington Street and Burrill Street in Swampscott, Massachusetts.

According to the May 2005 Massachusetts Heritage Landscape Inventory Program (Swampscott Reconnaissance Report), “This large residential neighborhood was planned by Frederick Law Olmsted, Sr. in 1888 at the request of the Swampscott Land Trust. The 130-acre estate had belonged to E. Redington Mudge. Olmsted’s plan with its curvilinear roads layout, traffic islands, entrance parkway, use of the topographic features and fine architecture is remarkably well preserved. The roads and traffic islands are maintained by the town. The shapes have not been altered; however the town has been unable to maintain original plant material. Part of the original plan showed “Overlook Park” with steps leading to it at the end of Monument Avenue. It was never constructed and in its place is a huge house on top of the hill. The original subdivision had 191 lots of varying sizes and shapes.” It was added to the National Register of Historic Places in 2002. At the same time, many argue that Olmsted never actually set foot in Swampscott, and the original plan was only for a strip of land that begins roughly at Humphrey Street and concludes where Monument Avenue turns into Walker Road.

== See also ==
- National Register of Historic Places listings in Essex County, Massachusetts
