= Swampscott, Massachusetts =

- Town
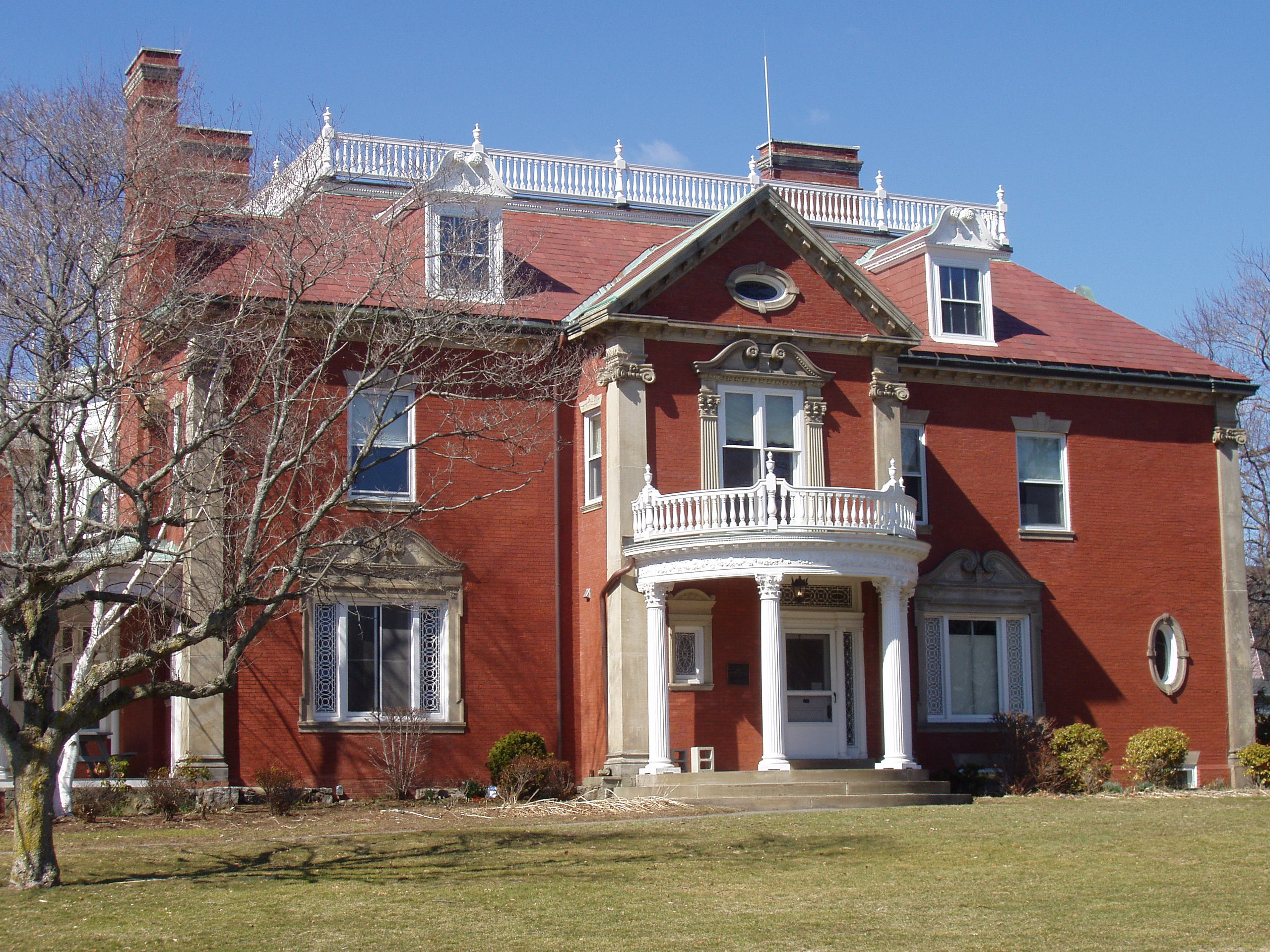
- Swampscott Town Hall, 22 Monument Ave

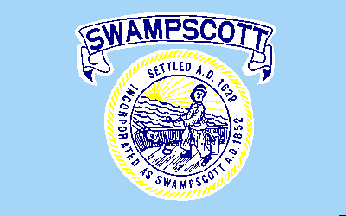
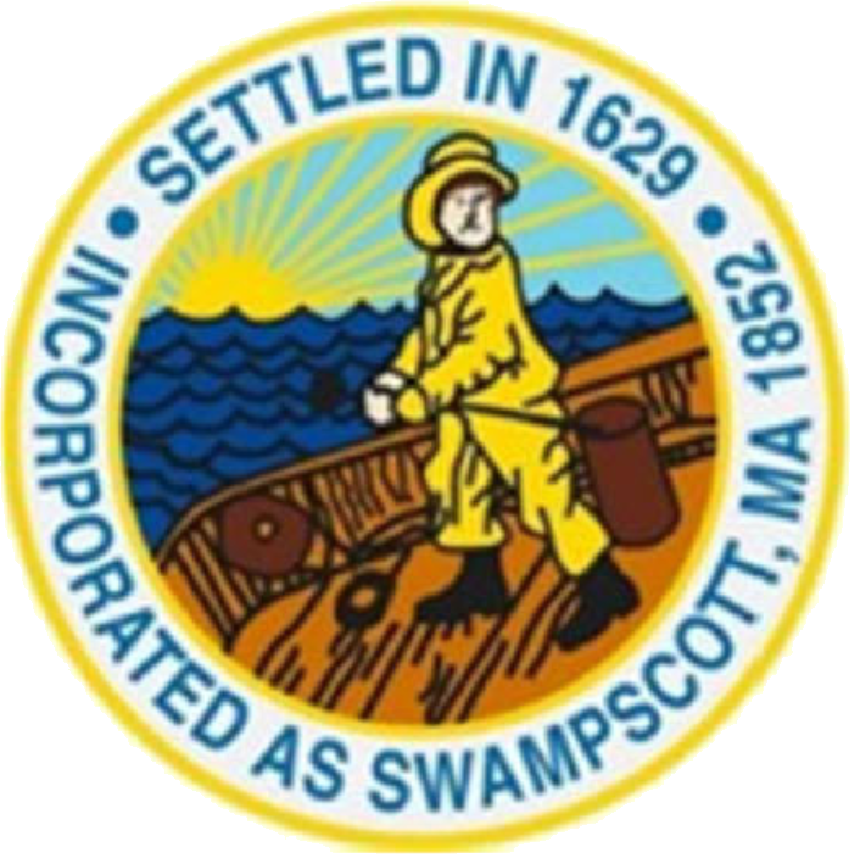
- Flag Seal

- Location in Essex County and the state of Massachusetts
- Coordinates: 42°28′15″N 70°55′05″W
- Country: United States
- State: Massachusetts
- County: Essex
- Settled: 1629
- Incorporated: 1852

Government
  - Type: Town Manager/Representative town meeting

Area
  - Total: 6.7 sq mi (17.4 km^{2})
  - Land: 3.1 sq mi (7.9 km^{2})
  - Water: 3.7 sq mi (9.6 km^{2})
- Elevation: 46 ft (14 m)

Population (2020)
  - Total: 15,111
  - Density: 4,954/sq mi (1,912.8/km^{2})
- Time zone: UTC-5 (Eastern)
  - Summer (DST): UTC-4 (Eastern)
- ZIP code: 01907
- Area code: 339 / 781
- FIPS code: 25-68645
- GNIS feature ID: 0618311
- Website: Town of Swampscott, Massachusetts, Official Web Site

Swampscott (/ˈswɒmpskət/) is a town in Essex County, Massachusetts, United States, located approximately 10 miles (16 km) up the coast from Downtown Boston in an area known as the North Shore. The population was 15,111 as of the 2020 United States census. A former summer resort on Massachusetts Bay, Swampscott is today a fairly affluent residential community and includes the village of Beach Bluff, as well as part of the neighborhood of Clifton.

== History ==
The area in and around Swampscott, Massachusetts has been inhabited by indigenous people for thousands of years; radiocarbon dating at archeological sites on the North Shore of Massachusetts places artifacts at around 10,000-11,000 years old, towards the end of the Younger Dryas period. Prior to European colonization, the town was inhabited by members of the Naumkeag, Pennacook, and Pawtucket groups and Massachusett tribe. They spoke an Eastern Algonquin language, and the Pawtucket migrated seasonally throughout the eastern coasts of Massachusetts and Rhode Island. It's estimated that 50-100 indigenous individuals resided in the Swampscott area at the time of European colonization. A series of epidemics following European colonization, including smallpox, killed many of the indigenous people living in the area, and it's estimated that fewer than 50 individuals remained by the late 17th century.

Wood's New England Prospect lists "Swampscot (sic)" as a noted habitation in 1633 before extensive European colonization. According to an early twentieth century source, the name "Swampscott" is variously said to mean "at the red rock", "broken waters", or "pleasant water place".

Indigenous people in the Swampscott area subsisted on seasonally determined activities, including hunting, fishing, collecting wild plants and shellfish, and horticulture. They hunted deer, marine mammals, upland game birds, and ducks, and cultivated crops like corn, beans, pumpkin, squash, and tobacco.

Swampscott was first colonized by Europeans in 1629 when Francis Ingalls settled there and built the first Massachusetts Bay Colony tannery. Ingalls observed that the town's indigenous population lived in wigwams extending from Black Will's Cliff along the entire north shore. Swampscott has an important Revolutionary War site: the final home of General John Glover in Vinnin Square. During the War, the property was seized from Loyalist William Browne; Glover bought the land in 1781. The 1750s era Glover farmhouse, embedded in a former restaurant, is threatened with demolition for new development.

The town was first settled as the eastern part (Ward One) of Lynn, and was set off and officially incorporated in 1852.

In 1867, a piece of the far western end of Salem, then known as the "Salem Finger", became part of Swampscott. A beach town north of Boston, measuring 3 square miles (7.8 km^{2}) and abutting Salem, Marblehead and Lynn, Swampscott was an important destination for the wealthy at the beginning of the 20th century. While Revere Beach, which lies just several miles down the road, has the honor of technically being America's first public beach, Swampscott was the de facto first resort town. Lynn was the divider between the poor beach and the rich resort town.

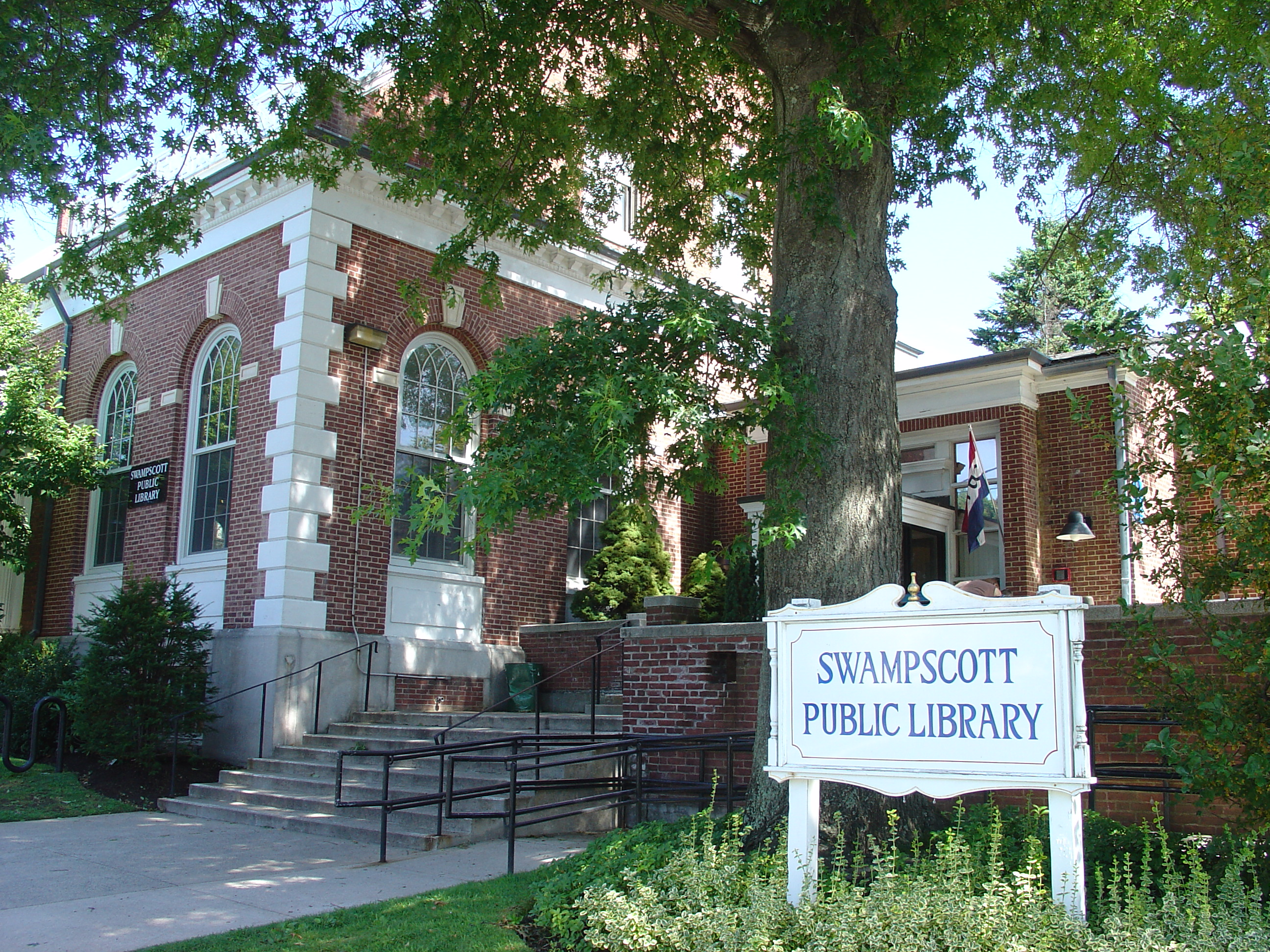
Swampscott Public Library

== Education ==
The community lies within the Swampscott School District.

Swampscott's public school system includes one elementary school, Swampscott Elementary School; one middle school, Swampscott Middle School; and one high school, Swampscott High School. The Machon elementary school was shut down in 2007, and is now a mixed-income senior community. The middle school and high school also serve students from nearby Nahant. In 2016, there were 706 students at Swampscott High School.

After construction of Swampscott Elementary School was completed in 2024, the Hadley Elementary School was shut down. Stanley Elementary School and Clarke Elementary School are also located in Swampscott. A new building was completed in 2007 for Swampscott High School. In 2011, Swampscott considered installing a wind turbine, with the approximate height of a 30-story building, on the property of the Swampscott Middle School, but ultimately rejected the project. In a special election on October 19, 2021, voters approved a new $98 million elementary school to be built on the site of the Stanley School. This new school replaced all former schools and opened to students in September 2024.

== Geography and transportation ==
Swampscott is located at 42°28′27″N 70°54′21″W (42.474409°N 70.905883°W). According to the United States Census Bureau, the town has a total area of 6.7 square miles (17.4 km^{2}), of which 3.0 square miles (7.9 km^{2}) is land and 3.7 square miles (9.6 km^{2}), or 54.83%, is water. Located beside Massachusetts Bay and the Atlantic Ocean, Swampscott lies along a mostly rocky shoreline, though there is enough clear shore for five beaches; Phillips which stretches into Preston and is by far the largest beach in town, Eisman's and Whales, Fisherman's, and a part of King's Beach, which extends into Lynn. There are several small parks, along with the small Harold King Forest in the northwest corner of town and the Tedesco Country Club which bisects part of the town. The town also has two small ponds, Foster Pond and Palmer Pond.

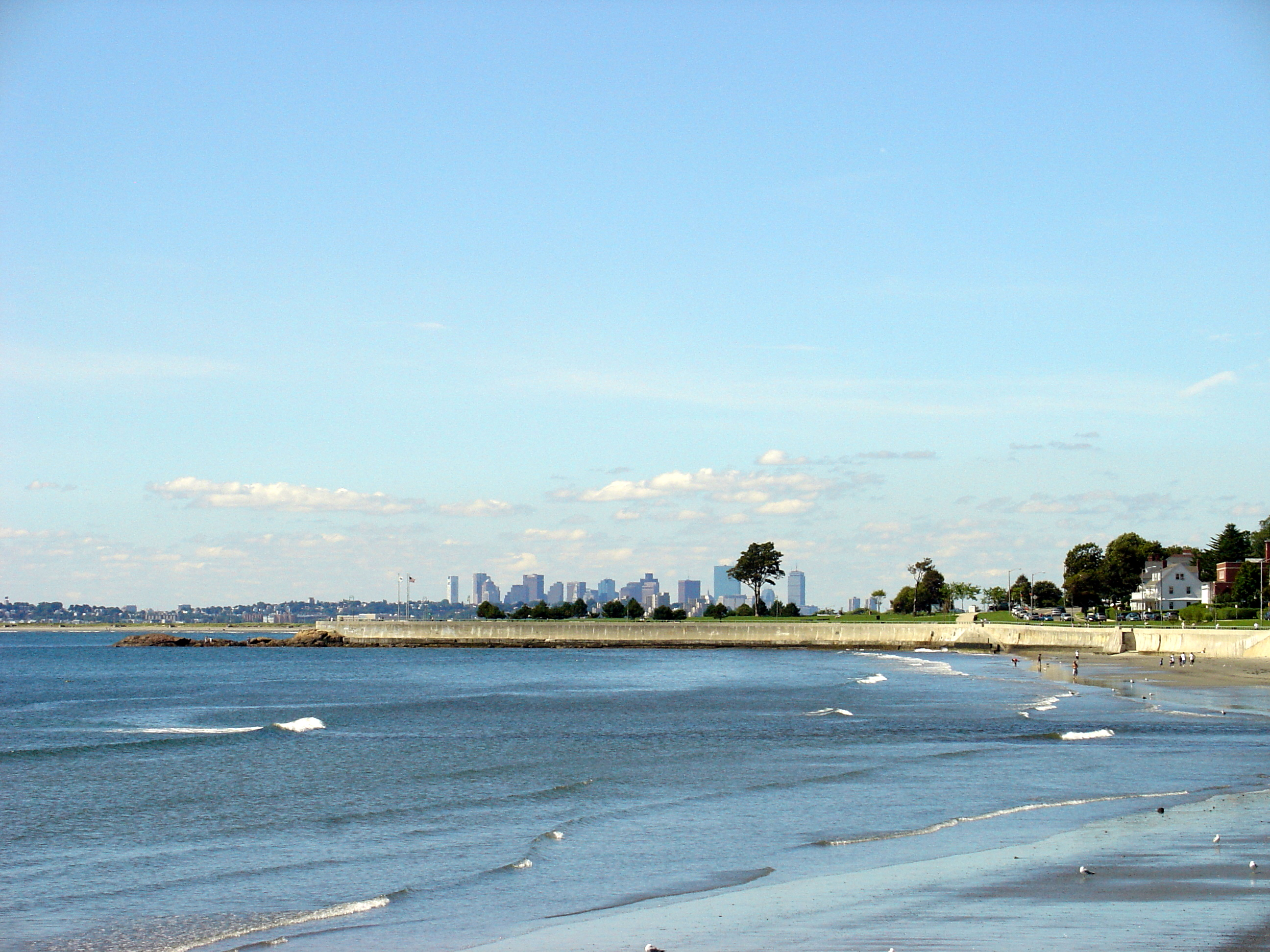
View of Boston from Swampscott shore

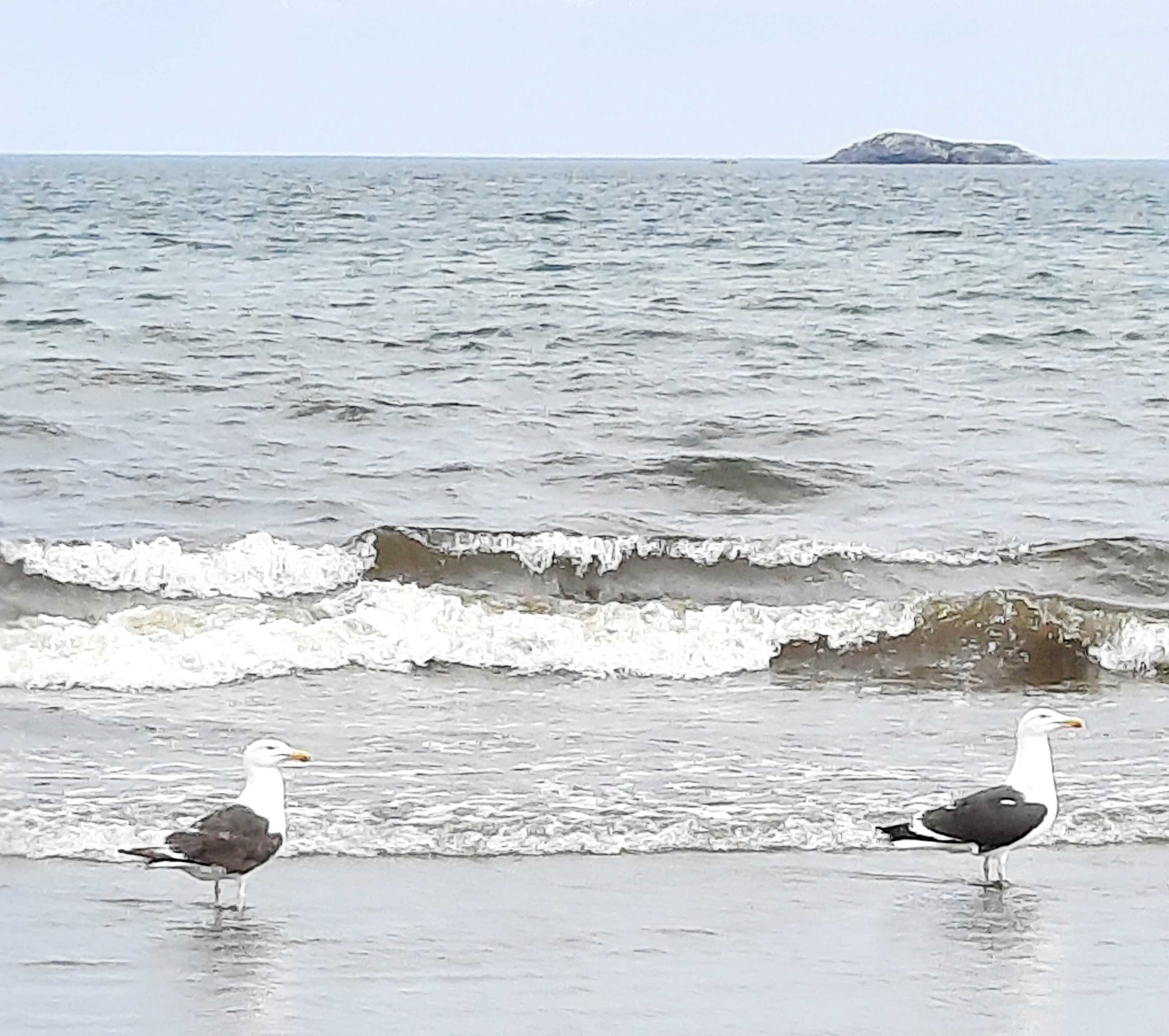
Great Black-backed Gull Swampscott MA June 2024

Swampscott is mostly suburban, with most of the clear land in the northwest corner of town. There are three villages within town, Beach Bluff to the east, Phillips Point to the south, and Phillips Beach inland between the two. The town is centered around Monument Square, designed by Frederick Law Olmsted; which is 4 miles (6 km) south of Salem, 12 miles (19 km) northeast of Boston, and 20 miles (32 km) southwest of Cape Ann. The town is 23 miles (37 km) to the nearest point in New Hampshire, in the town of Salem. Swampscott is bordered by Marblehead to the northeast, Salem to the northwest, and Lynn to the southwest. The water rights of the town extend into Massachusetts Bay, bordered by those of Marblehead and Lynn.

== Demographics ==
Historical population
Year	Pop.	±%
1860	1,530	—
1870	1,846	+20.7%
1880	2,500	+35.4%
1890	3,198	+27.9%
1900	4,548	+42.2%
1910	6,204	+36.4%
1920	8,101	+30.6%
1930	10,346	+27.7%
1940	10,761	+4.0%
1950	11,580	+7.6%
1960	13,294	+14.8%
1970	13,578	+2.1%
1980	13,837	+1.9%
1990	13,650	−1.4%
2000	14,412	+5.6%
2010	13,787	−4.3%
2020	15,111	+9.6%
2023*	15,487	+2.5%
* = population estimate. Source: United States census records and Population Estimates Program data.

As of the census of 2020, there were 15,111 people, with 6,093 households and 2.45 persons per household, residing in the town. The population density was 5,000.3 inhabitants per square mile (1,930.6/km^{2}). The racial makeup of the town was 91.5% White, 1.2% Black or African American, 0.2% American Indian or Alaska Native, 2.6% Asian, 0.0% Pacific Islander, and 3.7% from two or more races. Hispanic or Latino of any race were 5.6% of the population.

There were a total of 6,093 households, out of which 30% had children under the age of 18 living with them. 57% of households were married couples living together, 26.6% were a female householder with no spouse, and 10.3% were a male householder with no spouse. Of all households, 18.2% were made up of individuals, and 10.9% were individuals over the age of 65 living alone.

In town, the population was spread out, with 5.4% under 5 years, 20.5% under 18, 55.5% between the ages of 18 and 64, and 18.6% 65 years and over. The median age of residents was 45 years. For every 100 females age 18 and over, there were 87.2 males.

The median household income was $114,086, and the median income for a family was $143,320. Married-couple families had a median income of $156,341 and non-family households had a median income of $60,880. The per capita income for the town was $63,585. The town is ranked 54th on the List of Massachusetts locations by per capita income. About 5% of Swampscott residents were below the poverty line, including 4% of those under 18 years, 4.2% of those 18-64, and 9.1% 65 years and older. The homeownership rate was 73.4%, and the median value of owner-occupied housing units was $560,500.

The median home sale price for the town in 2007 was $565,894. Home values typically range from around $400,000 to upwards of $5 million for ocean front homes. These prices are comparable to other wealthy North Shore towns such as Marblehead and Manchester-by-the-Sea which are located nearby. In upper class oceanfront neighborhoods and neighborhoods with ocean views or views of the Boston skyline, average home prices increase to as much as $1,038,569 and average household incomes can range upwards of $150,000. Larger oceanfront properties have recently been assessed at values greater than $5 million and in some cases upwards of $10 million.

== Historic buildings and sites ==
- Elihu Thomson House: 1889 built home, now serves as Swampscott Town Hall
- John Humphreys House: 1700s house, one of the oldest in town, now home to Swampscott Historical Society
- Mary Baker Eddy Historic House: house where Mary Baker Eddy lived in the 1860s, one of considered birthplaces of Christian Science.
- Swampscott Fish House: 1896 built structure, the oldest active fish house in the country.
- General Glover Farm: 1700s built house and farm, home to Revolutionary war hero General John Glover.
- Swampscott Railway Depot: 1868 built railroad depot for the Eastern Railroad.
- Olmsted Subdivision Historic District, located on Monument Avenue

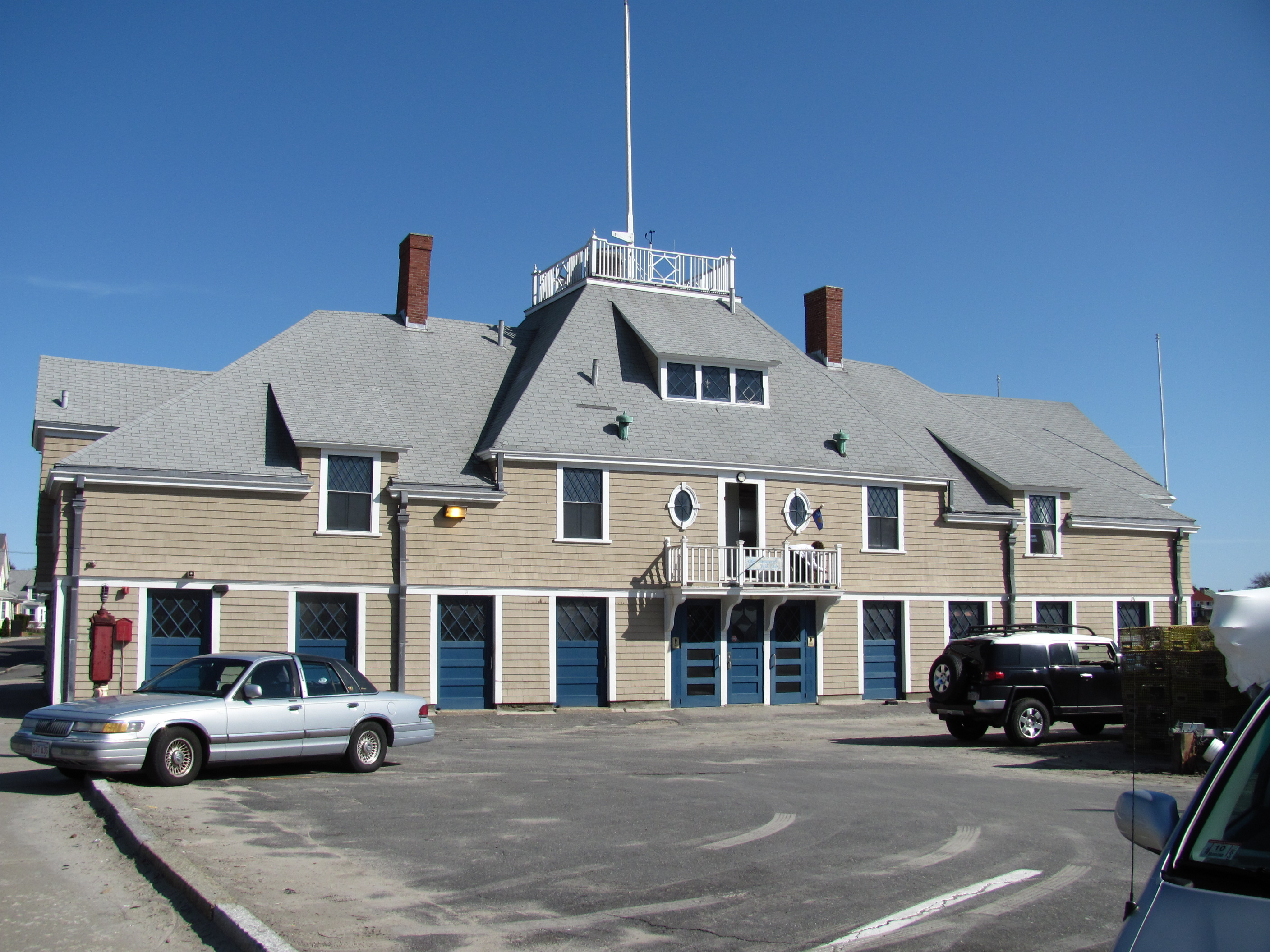
Swampscott Fish House, built 1896

Swampscott was home to White Court, Calvin Coolidge's Summer White House, and later Marian Court College until the college's closure in 2015, and demolition in 2018-2019.

== Transportation ==
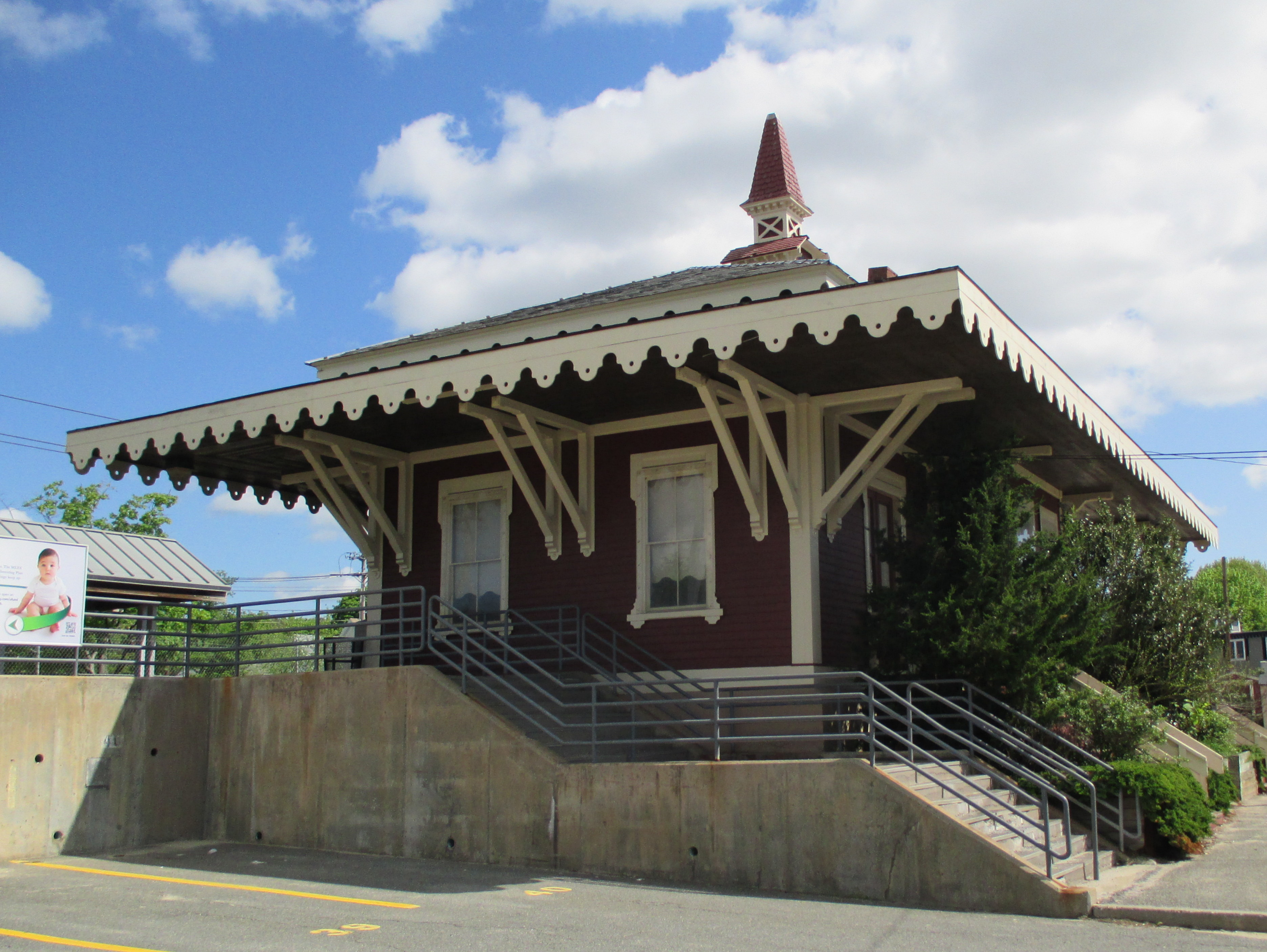
Swampscott Railway Depot

The MBTA provides passenger rail service from Boston's North Station with the Swampscott station on its Newburyport/Rockport Line, as well as several bus lines. An abandoned 4-mile branch of the Boston & Maine Railroad originating in Swampscott serves as the Marblehead Rail Trail.

Swampscott is located along Massachusetts Route 1A and Route 129. Both routes enter from Lynn, with Route 1A passing north of the town center towards Salem, and Route 129 following the coast for a half mile before going inland north of Phillips Point and returning to the coast before heading into Marblehead. There is no highway within town, which lies well south of Massachusetts Route 128 and Interstate 95. The town is served by numerous MBTA bus routes which lead into the surrounding towns.

The nearest air service can be reached at Beverly Municipal Airport, and the nearest national and international air service can be found at Boston's Logan International Airport.

== Notable people ==
- Marc Abrahams, mathematician
- Bill Adams, retired NFL player
- Harold Alfond, founder of Dexter Shoe
- Osborne Anderson, ice hockey player who competed in the 1932 Winter Olympics
- Anthony Athanas, restaurateur and philanthropist
- Charlie Baker, C.E.O. of Harvard Pilgrim Health Care, Inc., Governor of Massachusetts
- Charles Henry Bond, president and general manager of Waitt & Bond, one of Boston's largest real estate holders, and a patron of the arts
- Carol Brady, fictional TV mom
- Walter Brennan, multiple Academy Award-winning actor
- Freddy Cannon, rock singer who had hits with "Way Down Yonder in New Orleans" and "Palisades Park"
- Spencer Charnas, lead singer of American Metalcore band Ice Nine Kills
- Peggy Stuart Coolidge, composer and conductor
- Kyle Cooper, film director, title designer
- Mabel Wheeler Daniels, composer, conductor, and teacher
- Jamie Denbo, actress and comedian
- Mary Baker Eddy, founder of the Christian Science religion
- Larry Eigner, poet
- Jefferson Friedman, composer
- General John Glover, Revolutionary war veteran and hero in who helped row Washington's troops across Delaware and at Battle of Long Island
- Mel Goldstein, chief meteorologist for WTNH television in New Haven, Connecticut
- Nan Goldin, artist, photographer, activist
- Barry Goralnick, founder of Barry Goralnick Architects; theatrical producer of Eve-olution, Scituate, The Irish Curse, Saint Heaven
- Barry Goudreau, original guitarist of the rock group Boston and the Lisa Guyer Band
- Sarah P. Harkness, architect
- Jim Hegan, professional baseball catcher and coach
- Mary-Louise Hooper, civil rights activist
- Dick Jauron, professional football player and head coach of the NFL's Chicago Bears, Detroit Lions, and Buffalo Bills
- Harvey Jewell, Speaker of the Massachusetts House of Representatives from 1868 to 1871
- Theodora J. Kalikow, American academic and university president
- Jackson Katz, anti-domestic violence advocate
- Michael Kelly, journalist and magazine editor
- Piper Kerman, author of Orange Is the New Black: My Year in a Women's Prison
- Ken Linseman, former professional hockey player (Boston Bruins and Philadelphia Flyers)
- Alexander E. Little, founder of A.E. Little & Co. shoe manufactuer, owner of Sunbeam Farm
- Bradley Lord, 1961 US men’s figure skating champion who died in the Sabena Flight 548 crash
- Todd McShay, ESPN NFL draft prospect analyst
- Gerhard Neumann, German-born aviation engineer and innovator; former vice president of General Electric
- Chris Paine, documentary director
- Michael Palmer, author of The First Patient
- Barry Pederson, former NHL and Bruins all star; current NESN hockey analyst
- Johnny Pesky, pro baseball coach, former Red Sox shortstop
- Antonio Pierro, recognized as the oldest living man in the U.S. (January 9 to February 8, 2007) and the world's oldest living World War I veteran (January 24 to February 8, 2007)
- Dave Portnoy, founder of Barstool Sports
- Robert P. Reed, Catholic auxiliary bishop of Boston and rector of St. John's Seminary
- David Lee Roth, lead singer of the rock group Van Halen
- Blondy Ryan, World Series Champion, Major League Baseball shortstop for the New York Giants.
- George P. Sanger, lawyer, editor, judge, and businessman
- Mark Shasha, artist, author of Night of the Moonjellies
- Fran Sheehan, original bass player of the rock group Boston
- Lesley Stahl, 60 Minutes correspondent
- Thomas Stephens, Retired player for the NFL's Patriots
- G. Joseph Tauro, Chief Justice of the Massachusetts Supreme Judicial Court from 1970 to 1976
- Elihu Thomson, founder of General Electric
- Ilario Zannino, member of the Patriarca crime family

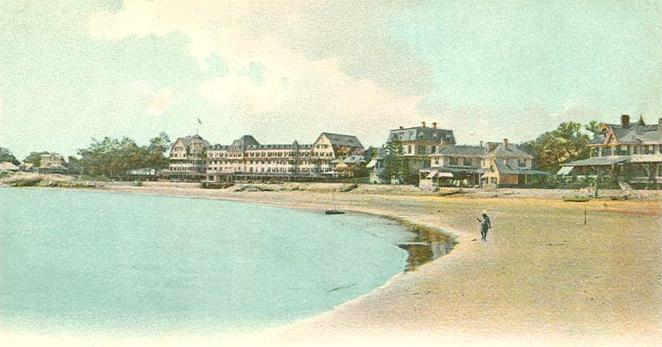
Whale Beach in 1909

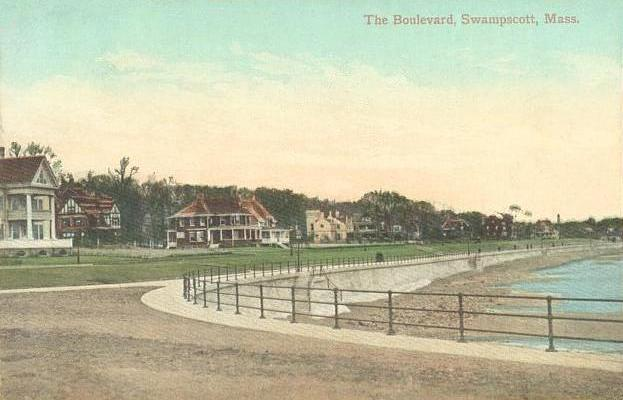
The Boulevard in 1910

The New Ocean House Hotel c. 1920

== See also ==
- Northern Strand Community Trail
