= Richard Rubin =

Richard Rubin may refer to:

- Richard Rubin (writer) (born 1967), American writer
- Richard Rubin (TV personality) (born 1983), American television personality and entertainer

== See also ==
- Rick Rubin (born 1963), American music producer
