= Marion Vannett Ridgway Award =

The Marion Vannett Ridgway Awards Since 1992

The Marion Vannett Ridgway Award is an annual award which celebrates only debut appearances of American authors and illustrators of children's books. Established in 1992 as a memorial award, the Ridgway holds a unique place in the American publishing industry as one of the few debut awards.

== A Memorial Award ==
Marion Vannett Ridgway was an artist's representative in the mid-20th century New York publishing community. According to The New York Times Ms. Ridgway was involved in the publishing industry for over 40 years. Elizabeth Park, a close friend, was said to have believed Ridgway was among the first women in this field. Ms. Park's wish was to continue the spirit of generosity and encouragement which Marion gave her young clients as they began their careers in publishing.

Ridgway's office was located at 299 Madison Avenue in Manhattan and represented commercial artists, photographers and writers for publishers and advertising companies. She wrote 11 books for children early in her career. Ridgway died on May 27, 1991, in Southbury, Connecticut, of pneumonia. She was 88 years old.

== Origination ==
Created in 1992 as a memorial award, the first reception was held May 25, 1993, at the Doral Hotel in New York City. Attendees included Illustrator Ian Schoenherr and Artist/Author Mark Shasha among others.

== Judging Process ==
Several judges are selected by the administrator and awards are distributed in May of each year. The awards consist of a First Prize and two or three Honor Awards. The administrator since 2006 has been Christine Alfano. Earlier administrators include Elizabeth Park, Dennis Nolan and Mark Shasha.

The award is not for profit and is funded by the Elizabeth Park Trust. As of this writing (Jan 2009) the address of the award is listed as 4205 Drew Avenue South, Minneapolis, MN 55410^{1}

Some previous winners of The Marion Vannett Ridgway Award include:

- 1992, Ian Schoenherr - Illustrator - "Newf" (Philomel Books, ISBN 978-0-399-21875-0)
- 1992, Mark Shasha - Author and Illustrator - "Night of the Moonjellies" (Simon & Schuster)
- 1994, John Coy, Author - "Night Driving" (Henry Holt & Company, ISBN 0-8050-2931-1)
- 2000, Jerome Lagarrigue, Illustrator, "My Man Blue" (Dial)
- 2001, Ian Falconer - Author and Illustrator, "Olivia" (Athenaeum)

References:

- The New York Times, Marion Vannett Ridgway, Artist's Agent, 88 - p. 25, May 29, 1991
- The Marion Vannett Ridgway Awards - History. (From the Award Website)
1. 1 The Marion Vannett Ridgway Awards - Contact. (From the Award Website)
