= Alexander E. Little =

American shoe manufacturer (1859–1956)

Alexander Elbridge Little
- Born: December 12, 1859; Middleborough, Massachusetts
- Died: July 19, 1956 (aged 96); Swampscott, Massachusetts
- Resting place: Swampscott Cemetery
- Known for: A.E. Little & Co. shoe manufactuer, Sorosis Shoes Sunbeam Farm General Glover Inn
- Spouse: Lillian A. Morrison
- Children: Edwin M. Gerould (stepson)
- Parents: Elbridge Gerry Little (father); Lucia F. Sanderson (mother)
- Relatives: Walter Sanderson Little (brother) Sarah Isabel Little (sister)

Alexander Elbridge Little (December 12, 1859 – July 19, 1956), also known as A.E. Little, was the founder of American shoe manufacturer A.E. Little & Co., maker of Sorosis Shoes in Lynn, Massachusetts. A.E. Little was a land owner known for building the Sorosis Farms to provide produce for his shoe workers in Marblehead and Swampscott. He was also a founder of Tedesco Country Club and friend of U.S. president Calvin Coolidge.

== Early life ==
Alexander Elbridge Little was born on 11 December 1859, in Middleborough, Massachusetts, his parents were Rev. Elbridge Gerry Little, a Wellesley clergyman, and mother Lucia F. Sanderson. He was a descendant of Samuel Little, a Revolutionary War veteran from New Hampshire.

He married Lillian Morrison, whose family farming expertise would contribute to their farms later in life. Her grandfather, Young Morrison, developed cold frame greenhouses capable of growing vegetable out of season in New England, which secured him a lucrative contract with the Parker House in Boston.

== Businesses ==
=== A.E. Little & Co. ===
Building upon the success of Jan Ernst Matzeliger's automated "shoe laster" machine that was brought to the Lynn and helped spur its shoe industry, A.E. Little was able to utilize the technology to build his own shoe empire in Lynn, Massachusetts. He also would build shoe plants in Newburyport and Brockton, Massachusetts.

==== Sorosis Shoes ====
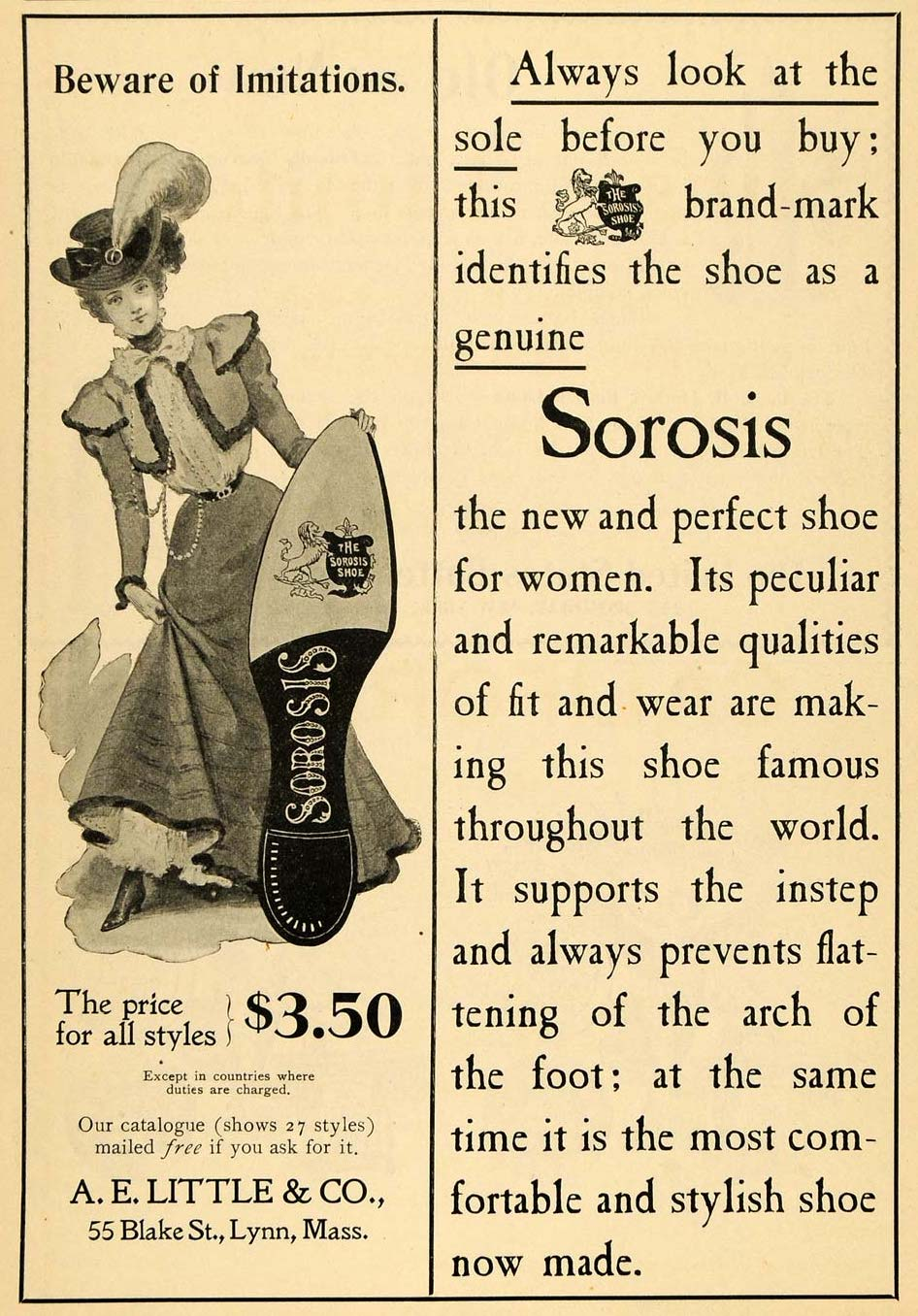
A.E. Little Sorosis Shoes advertisement

A. E. Little introduced the Sorosis brand in 1897, and was the first women's shoe to be branded with a trade-mark. The name was derived from the ancient Greek word for sisterhood, and was also the name of a famous women's suffrage group Sorosis of the late 19th century. The shoes were made in Lynn, MA and would gain national popularity.

By 1901, Sorosis shoes popularity grew and were sold internationally, with stores opening in London, Berlin, and Paris. In Vienna, there was protest to the Austro-Hungarian government by 600 shoemakers because the American made shoes had greater sales and popularity compared to their local brands.

1901 illustration showing the expansive shoe empire of A.E. Little & Co.

In 1926, after years of strikes, Alexander would shut down his Lynn shoe factory and focus his business on the Sunbeam Farm.

=== Sorosis Farm ===
A.E. Little purchased the Wyman land in Marblehead in 1910, along with additional land in Salem and Swampscott in order to grow and sell food products to his workers at the A. E. Little & Co. shoe factories. The farms would comprise over 520 races at its height, spread through all three communities.

The Marblehead farm would be called Sorosis Farm, named after his famous shoes. He got 75-100 high school age boys from Essex county to work on the farms, who were organized into military like companies, forming the first model for the Works Progress Administration groups in the United States.

In 1934, due to the Great Depression, Little's farms closed and most of the Marblehead land was sold off.

=== Sunbeam Farm & General Glover Inn ===
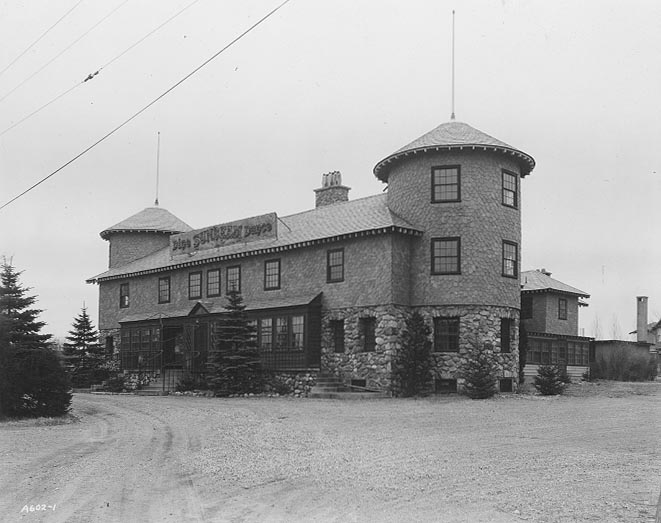
Sunbeam Inn in Swampscott, MA

After closing both his shoes factories and farms, Alexander Little and his wife Lillian would continue to maintain their remaining farmland that bordered Swampscott, Salem and Marblehead. Continuing to grow produce, they would also pivot to the tourist and recreational industry under the name Sunbeam Farm.

Glover Farmhouse, adaptively repurposed into the General Glover Inn by Alexander & Lillian Little

The Little's had purchased the former Glover Farm in 1919, which included the historic General Glover Farmhouse, the final home of Revolutionary War hero General John Glover. They made the effort to restore the 1700s house, uncovering the historic fireplaces and colonial details. They transformed the historic house into the General Glover Inn & Tea room, celebrating the legacy of the Revolutionary war hero. The Inn would be managed by Lillian Little.

The Little's themselves would convert the old barn behind the General Glover Inn into their home, which is known today as the A.E. Little House. Along with their home the former Glover Farm land would include the General Glover Gift Shop, a barn with attached greenhouse. The Sunbeam Golf Club was created on the Salem side of the site, while the turreted Sunbeam Inn building built alongside Paradise Road in Swampscott.

Even at the age of 96, A.E. Little would continue to manage the Sunbeam farm with his wife Lillian, until his death. Their house and land would eventually be sold to Anthony Athanas in 1957 to become corporate offices for his restaurants.

== Death ==
A.E. Little would live the remainder of his life with his wife Lillian at their house on the Glover Farm site at 299 Salem Street in Swampscott. He died on 18 July 1956, in Swampscott, Massachusetts, at the age of 96, and was buried in Swampscott Cemetery.

== Legacy ==
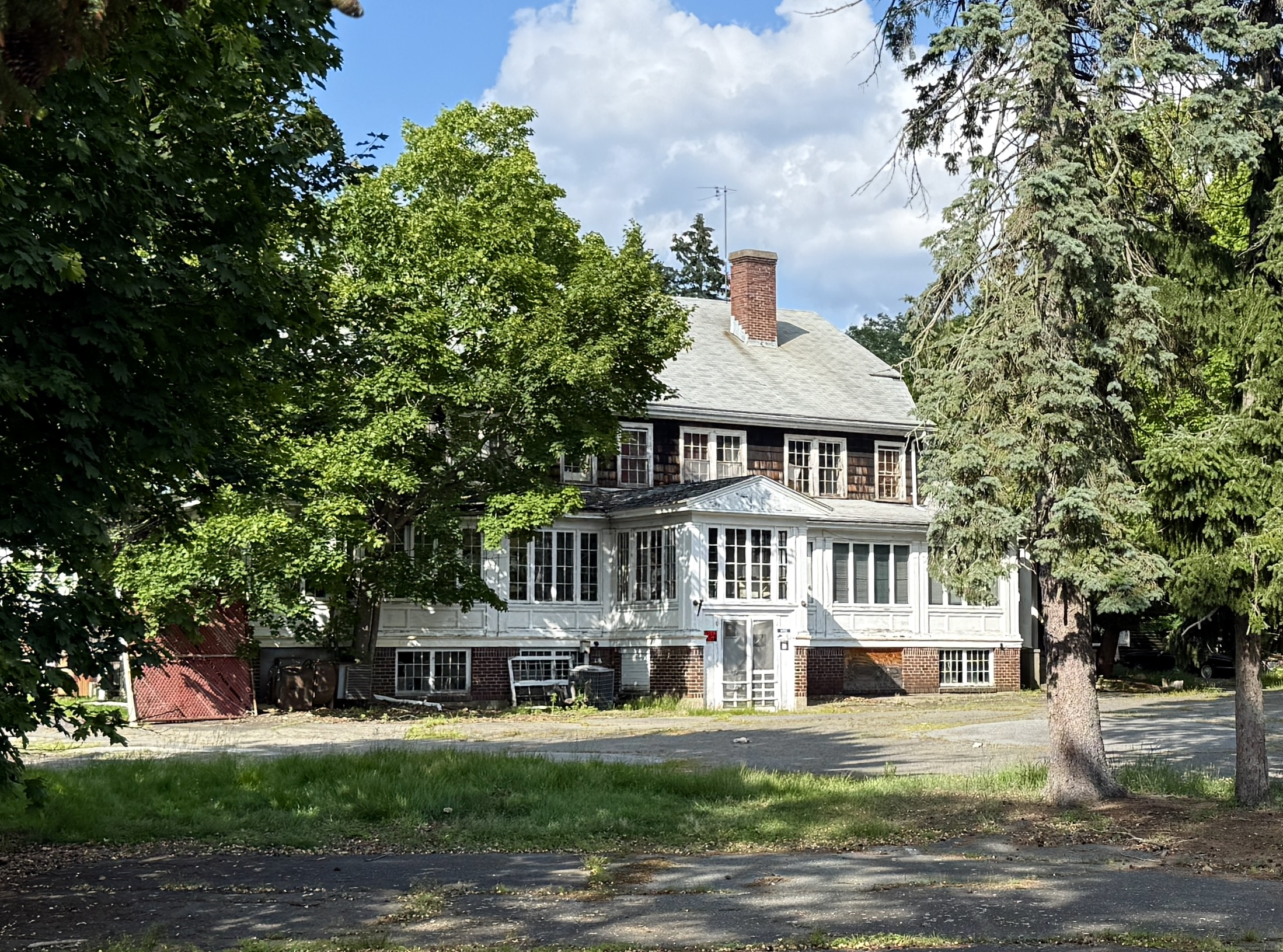
The historic A.E. Little House, converted from the old barn, and the final home of Alexander and Lillian Little at 299 Salem Street, Swampscott, MA

Outside of Essex county, Alexander E. Little is still most well known for his contributions to the shoe industry, and Sorosis shoes. Due to their importance, many of his shoes are part of museum collections throughout the United States including the Metropolitan Museum of Art, Philadelphia Museum of Art, and the Miami Shoe Museum.

A.E. Little and his wife Lillians final home and farm, including their General Glover Inn, still stand today at 299 Salem Street in Swampscott, Massachusetts, but are threatened by demolition.
