= William Browne (judge) =

American judge (1737–1802)

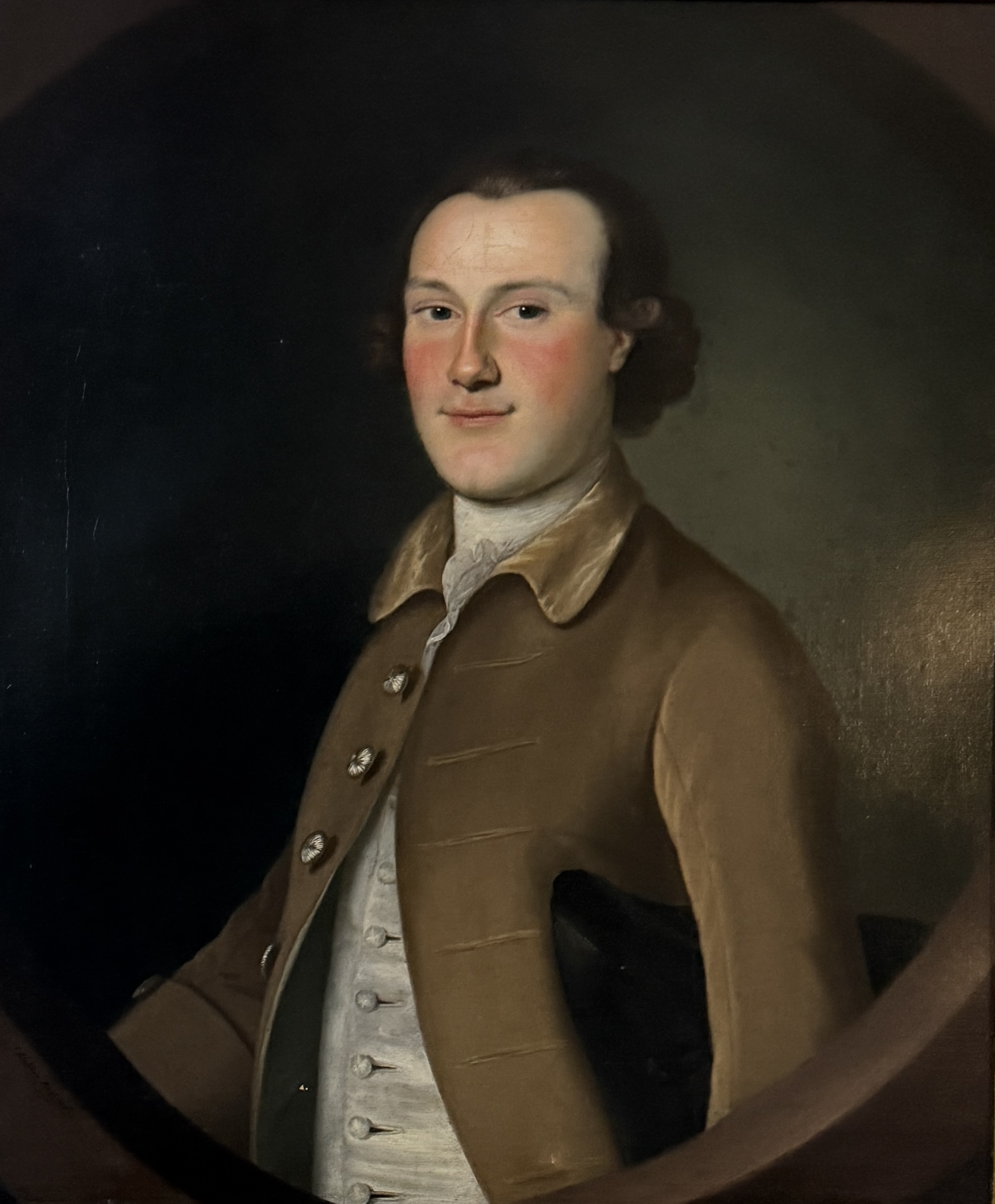

Justice of the Massachusetts Superior Court of Judicature 1774-1776
- Preceded by: Nathaniel Ropes
- Succeeded by: None (American Revolution)

Governor of Bermuda 1781-1788
- Preceded by: George Bruere the Younger
- Succeeded by: Henry Hamilton

Personal details
- Born: February 27, 1737 Salem, Massachusetts Bay Colony
- Died: February 13, 1802 Westminster, England
- Spouse: Ruth Wanton
- Children: William Browne Jr, Mary (Browne) Tucker, Catharine Browne
- Parent(s): Samuel Browne; Catharine Winthrop
- Education: Harvard College

William Browne (February 27, 1737 – February 13, 1802) was a justice of the Massachusetts Superior Court of Judicature (the highest court of the Province of Massachusetts Bay) from 1774 to 1775, and Governor of Bermuda from 1782 to 1788.

== Early life ==
Born in Salem, Massachusetts on February 27, 1737, son of Samuel Browne Jr. and Catherine Winthrop. He was the part of the prominent Browne family of Salem, and through his mother's side, he was descended from four colonial governors, including John Winthrop. Browne attended Harvard College and was classmate and friend of John Adams. His college portrait was painted by notable artist Joseph Blackburn. He graduated in 1755 and was valedictorian of his class.

Browne married Ruth Wanton, daughter of Rhode Island Governor Joseph Wanton. In 1762 he was appointed as collector of the port of Salem, a position he held until 1766 when he was dismissed for sympathizing with colonist on the Sugar Act. William Browne was also a colonel of the Essex County militia.

== Massachusetts judge ==
William Browne was appointed a judge in Essex County from 1770, and later appointed to the Massachusetts high court in 1774, following the death of Nathaniel Ropes. He was appointed by Governor Thomas Hutchinson, though his appointment was approved during the tenure of Governor Thomas Gage.

=== American Revolution ===
Browne was forced out of office during the American Revolution, in part for refusing to reject the heightened salary granted to judges by the Crown. He was also appointed a mandamus councilor to Governor Gage, a post he refused to resign, earning him widespread dislike in Massachusetts. This refusal led to the resignation of all of the officers of the Essex County militia regiment he led. In 1774, he and his family fled to Boston.

=== Seizure of property ===
Browne Family Farm that would become the Glover Farm in Salem & Marblehead (present day Swampscott)

Browne left Massachusetts for England in 1776, and his extensive family properties in Salem were later seized by the state in 1781. This included: his mansion in downtown Salem, along with his farm on the Marblehead and Salem border, that would eventually become known as the General Glover Farm, and the remnants of Browne Hall that he inherited in what is now present day Danvers. This site would later be mentioned by Nathaniel Hawthorne in his writing Browne's Folly.

== Governor of Bermuda ==
William Browne was appointed Governor of Bermuda by the prime minister, Lord North, in 1781. Arriving in Bermuda in 1782, he immediately took steps to improve the island's defenses and raising militia companies heavily populated with exiled Loyalists. Following American independence, he sought to establish trade with the new United States and make Bermuda a free port. Browne eventually received some financial compensation from the British government for his family's losses.

== Later life and death ==
William Browne would retire as governor at the age of 51, and move to Westminster, England. He would leave Bermuda in better shape than he found it, having established commerce with the new United States that would ensure the islands economic sustainability. Browne is noted as saying that “Bermuda is divided on domestic business, but it is united in its loyalty to His Majesty”.

William Browne died in England on February 13, 1802. John Adams remembered his friend and former classmate as "a solid, judicious character...They made him a judge of the superior court and that society made of him a refugee. A Tory I verily believe he never was."

Legal offices
Preceded by Nathaniel Ropes	Justice of the Massachusetts Superior Court of Judicature; 1774–1775	Vacant American Revolution
Political offices
Preceded by George Bruere the Younger	Governor of Bermuda; 1782-1788	Succeeded by Henry Hamilton
