= Marian Court College =

Defunct college in Massachusetts, United States

- Former name: Marian Court Secretarial School
- Motto: Seek Knowledge. Serve All.
- Type: Private, Four-Year, Liberal Arts
- Active: 1964–2015
- Affiliations: Roman Catholic, Sisters of Mercy
- Location: Swampscott, Massachusetts, United States; 42°27′55.18″N 70°53′21.3″W
- Colors: Blue and Gold
- Nickname: We are Mercy Spirit!
- Website: http://www.mariancourt.edu

Marian Court College was a private Catholic liberal arts college in Swampscott, Massachusetts United States. It was founded and sponsored by the Sisters of Mercy, originally as a secretarial college. The college opened in 1964 and closed on June 30, 2015.

The Sisters of Mercy founded Marian Court College in 1964 as a two-year secretarial college for women. It became Marian Court Junior College of Business in 1980, and by 1984 offered associate degrees. In 1994 it changed its name to Marian Court College. It offered day and evening programs for women and men leading to a Bachelor in Science degree, and in 2012 began offering four-year degrees in business and criminal justice. On May 1, 2015, the college celebrated its fiftieth anniversary.

The school closed on June 30, 2015, as a result of financial problems stemming from generally declining enrollment. It was a non-residential college, the only entirely commuter Catholic college in the country; enrollment in 2013 was 266, 183 FTE. The last graduating class was 67.

The campus was on a 6-acre (2.4 ha) oceanfront estate, with Calvin Coolidge's Summer White House, originally called White Court, as the main building.

Marian Court was regionally accredited by the New England Association of Schools and Colleges. Denise Hammon was the last president.

== Gallery ==
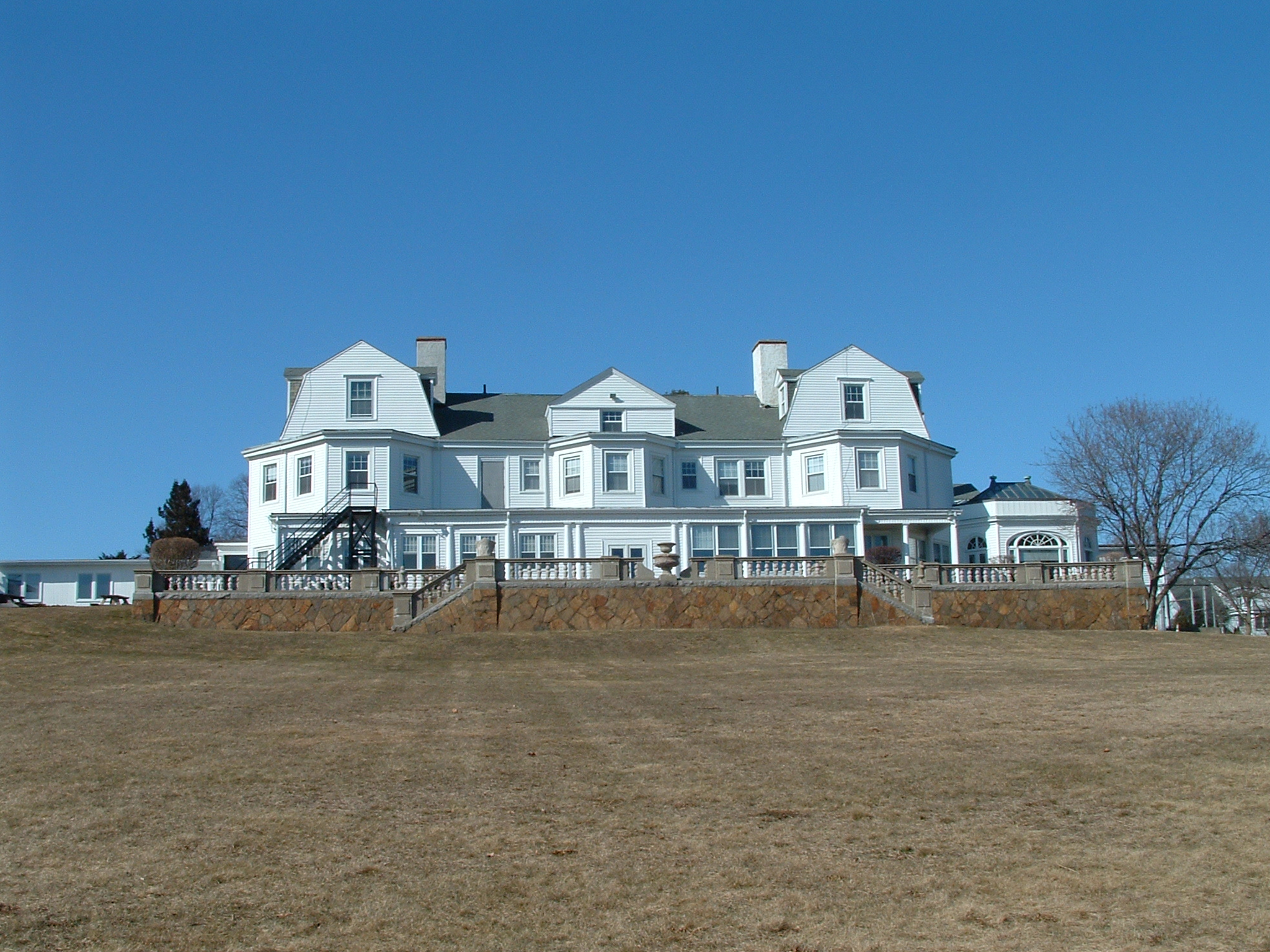
Seaside view

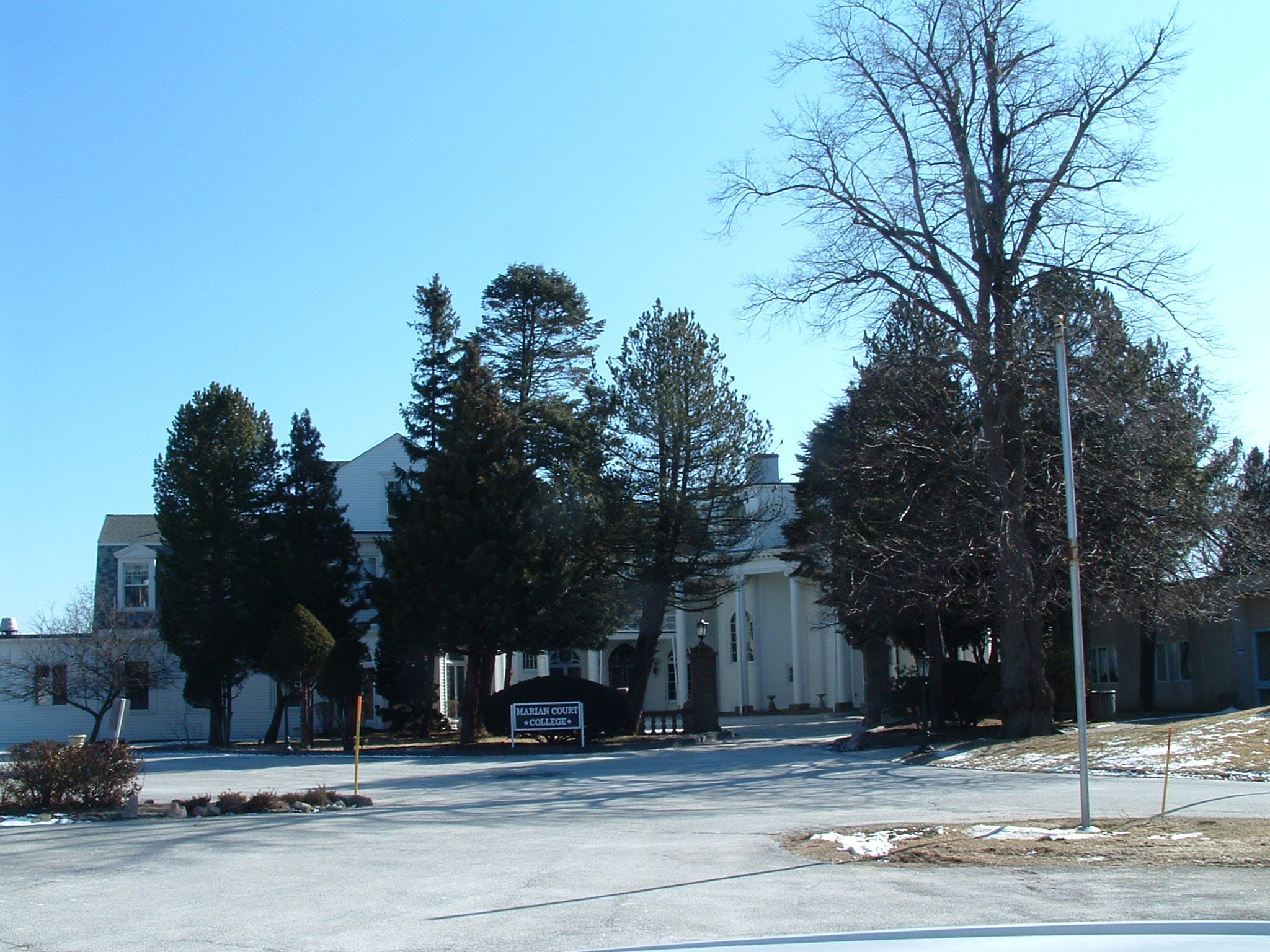
Front view

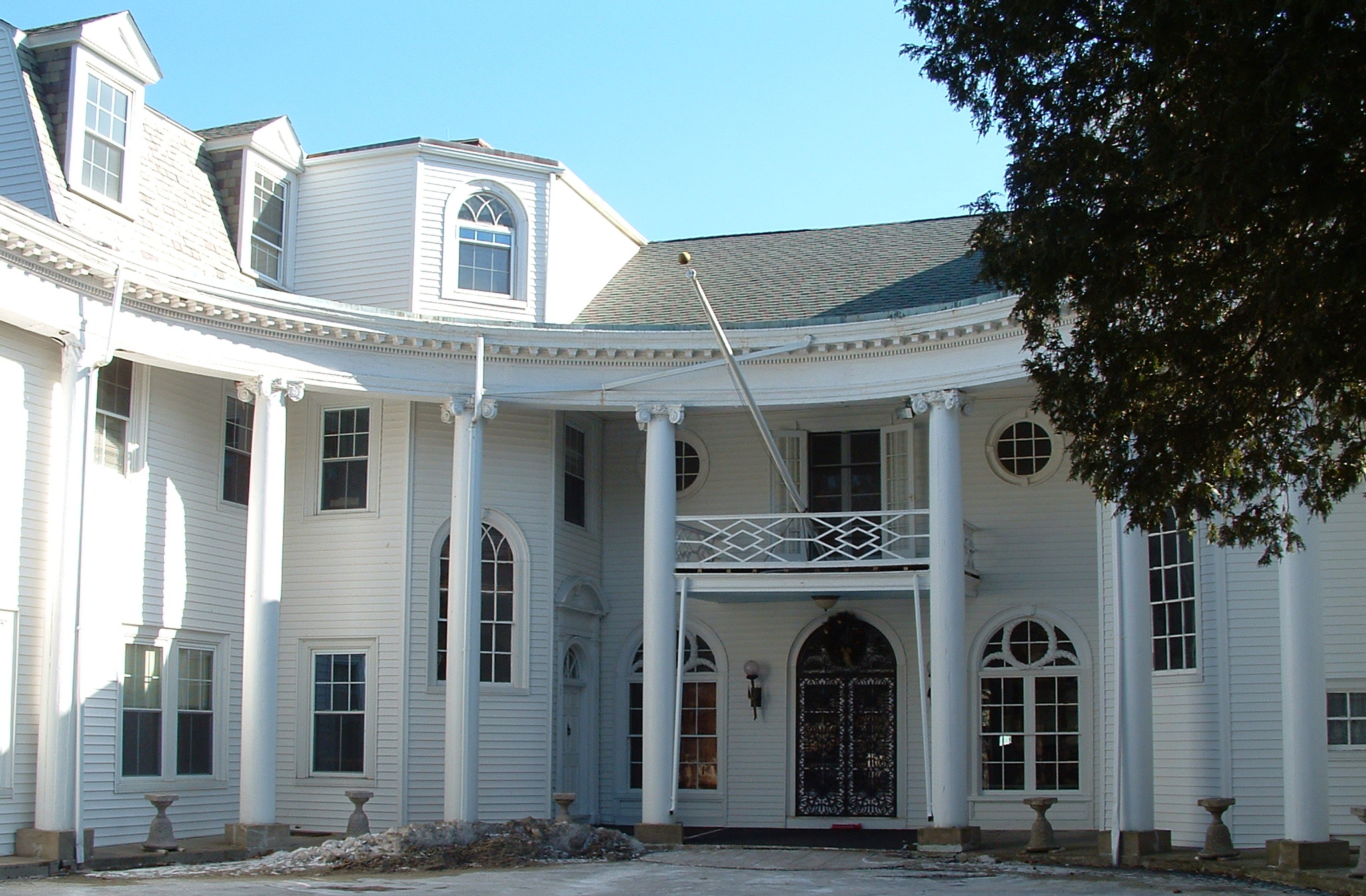
Entrance
