= Barry Goralnick =

American interior designer

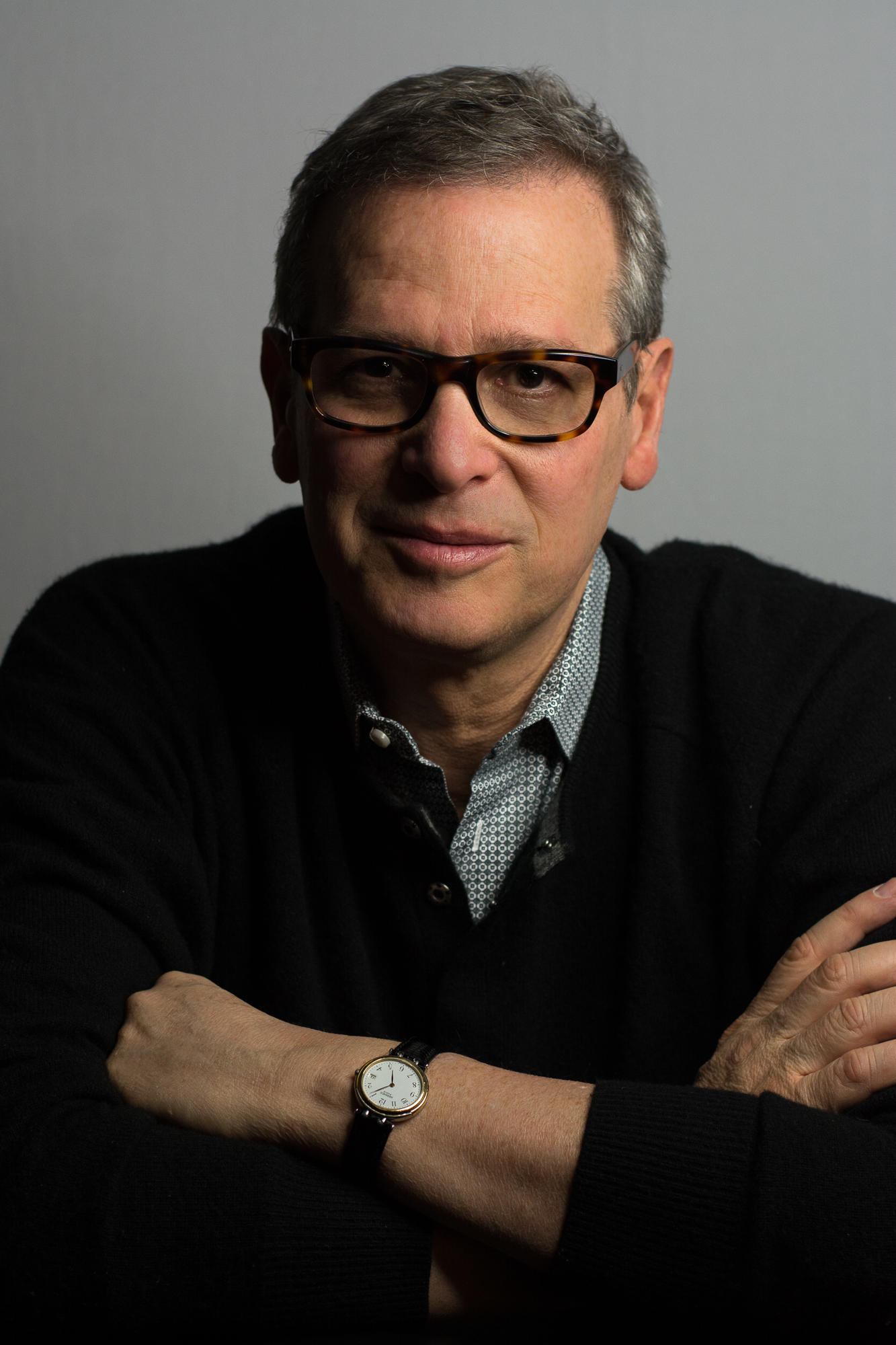
- Born: Swampscott, Massachusetts,
- Occupation(s): Interior designer, Architect
- Website: barrygoralnick.com

Barry Goralnick is an American designer working in the fields of architecture and interior design, and the design of home furnishings that include furniture, lighting, and carpets. He is the founder and principal of Goralnick Architecture & Design, based in New York, NY.

Goralnick is also an established theatre producer, and an active member of New York's theatre community.

== Biography ==
Goralnick was born in Swampscott, Massachusetts, in 1955. He graduated from Swampscott High School in 1973 and earned a bachelor's degree from Brandeis University in 1977– where he majored in English Literature, minored in Fine Art, and graduated magna cum laude. He studied English Literature and Architecture History at the University of Reading in England in 1976. He received a master's degree from Harvard University’s Graduate School of Design in 1981.

== Architecture and design career ==
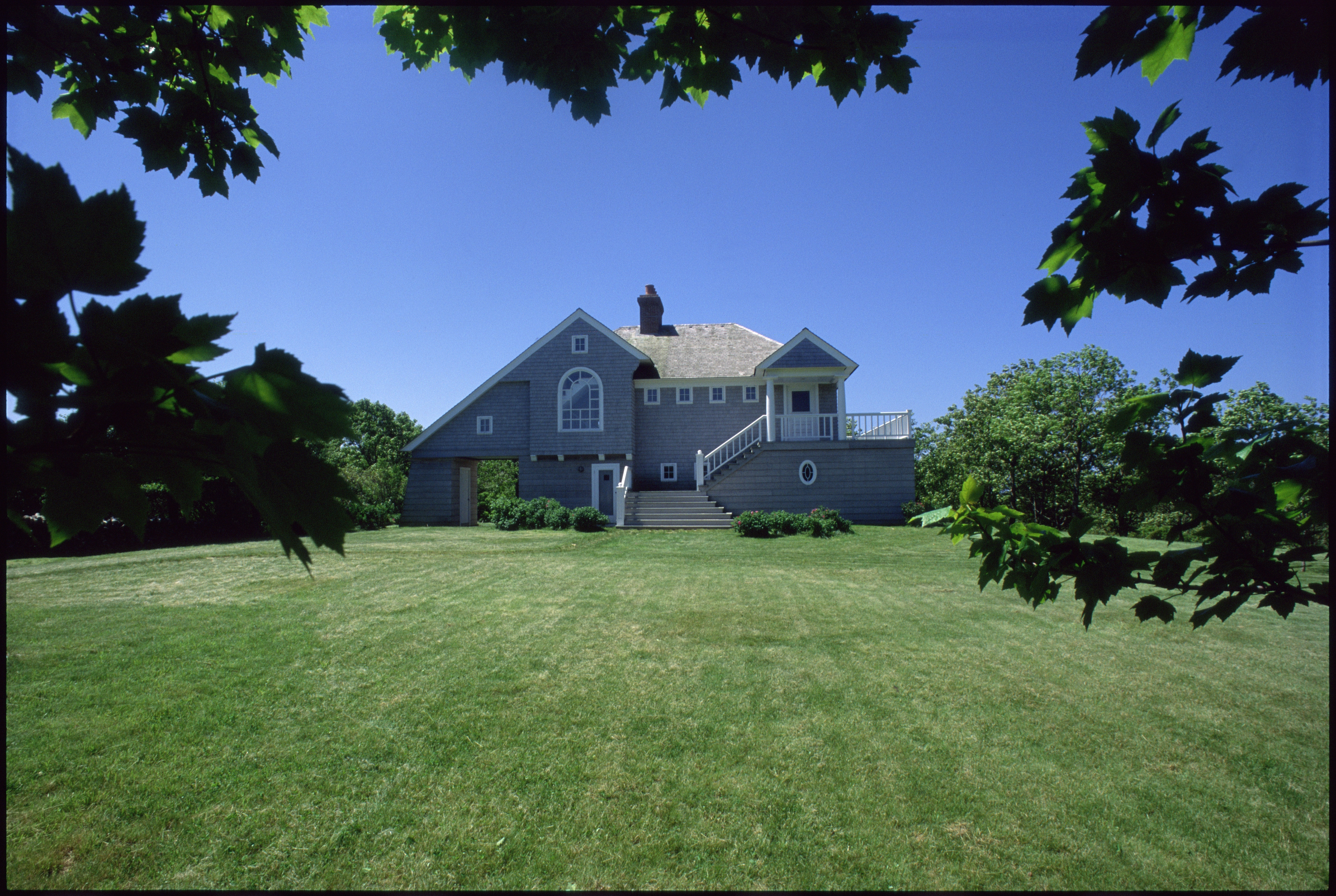
Martha's Vineyard Residence

Goralnick commenced his design career in 1981, working with architects Stephen Potters and Emilio Ambasz. He further honed his skills with esteemed Modernist architect Wayne Berg, working on a mix of residential and fashion-centric projects that would prove essential to his career development. Clients there included Alan Alda, Bill Blass, Donna Karan, and John Gutfreund. He later worked for legendary architect Robert A.M. Stern. Goralnick opened his own firm in 1984.

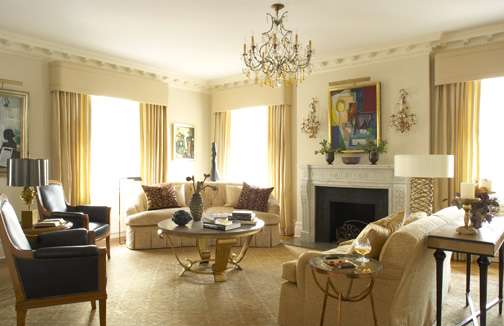
Apartment Residence

He has worked on projects that include residential, corporate, and religious applications, with notable clients including Emmy Award-winning actor John Lithgow, humorist Lisa Birnbach, author Erica Jong and producer Aaron Russo.

In addition to his residential projects, Goralnick has designed products for a variety of home and hospitality companies including tableware for Arta Broch, tableware and giftware for Villeroy & Boch, faucetry and plumbing fixtures for Watermark, lighting and furniture for Currey & Company, furniture for Vanguard Furniture, lighting for Visual Comfort, rugs and carpets Stark Carpet, and others. His products are sold and distributed worldwide.

== Theatre career ==
In addition to his established design career, Goralnick – an avid theatre enthusiast – founded the New York-based Fresh Produce, Inc. theatre production company in 2001. The company's mission is to produce new musicals and plays by American writers, and has recently produced titles including Eve-olution (by Hilary Illick and Jennifer Krier starring Law & Order’s Mary McCormack and The Cosby Show’s Sabrina Le Beauf), The Irish Curse (by Martin Casella), Saint Heaven (starring Tony-winner Chuck Cooper, Tony nominee Montego Glover and Deborah Gibson, book by Martin Casella; music and lyrics by Keith Gordon), and Scituate (by Martin Casella). He co-produced The Report by Martin Casella at the New York Fringe Festival in 2015, where it won the Best Writing Award. He also co-produced a London reading of The Report in 2016.

He was on the Board of the Edge Theater Company and studied at the Commercial Theater Institute.

== Recent awards ==
2023 Best Furniture Designer - Build Home and Garden Award

2022 Best Product Designer - ARTS Awards

2017 IDA Innovation in Design Award, Reader's Choice - Cottages & Gardens

2016 Best of Year Award - Interior Design Magazine

2015 Best Furniture of the Year - Architectural Digest

== Media coverage ==
Goralnick and his design work have been featured in print publications, including the following:

- Architectural Digest
- The New York Times
- Wall Street Journal
- House Beautiful
- Interior Design
- Decor
- Traditional Home
- Metropolitan Home
- Elle Decor
- Vanity Fair
- Country Living
