= Confederacy of Silence =

2002 book by Richard Rubin

- Author: Richard Rubin
- Language: English
- Publisher: Atria Books
- Publication date: 2002
- Publication place: United States
- ISBN: 9780671036669

Confederacy of Silence: A True Tale of the New Old South is a 2002 book by Richard Rubin. It is about Rubin's experience as a recent University of Pennsylvania graduate and work as a reporter in Greenwood, Mississippi. It was published by Atria Books in 2002 (ISBN 9780671036669).

== Synopsis ==
When Richard Rubin, fresh out of the Ivy League, accepts a job at a daily newspaper in the old Delta town of Greenwood, Mississippi, he is thrust into a place as different from his hometown of New York as any in the country. Yet to his surprise, he is warmly welcomed by the townspeople and soon finds his first great scoop in Handy Campbell, a poor, black teen and gifted high school quarterback who goes on to win a spot on Mississippi State's team — a training ground for the NFL. Six years later, Rubin, back in New York, learns that Campbell is locked up in Greenwood, accused of capital murder. Returning south to cover the trial, Rubin follows the trail that took Handy from the football field to county jail. As the best and worst elements of Mississippi rise up to do battle over one man's fate, Rubin must confront his own unresolved feelings about the confederacy of silence that initially enabled him to thrive in Greenwood but ultimately forced him to leave it.
