= Nathaniel Ropes =

American judge (c. 1726–1774)

Nathaniel Ropes (c. 1726 – March 18, 1774) was a justice of the Massachusetts Supreme Judicial Court from 1772 to 1774. He was appointed by Governor Thomas Hutchinson.

Ropes graduated from Harvard University in 1745 with a degree in law and started out as a lawyer. He was a representative of Salem in the colonial legislature in 1760 and 1761, and served on the Governor’s Council from 1762 to 1768. He was also a judge on the Inferior Court of Common Pleas and a judge of probate until 1772, when he was appointed as a justice on the Superior Court of Judicature. Ropes was soon brought into controversy over how judges were paid at the time. Although he was acquainted with patriots such as John Adams, an issue remained where he still held loyalist views. Just before or during the Revolutionary War a mob is said to have raged outside of the house to protest his loyalist ties. In one of the traditional narratives, this event takes place in March 1774 when Ropes was on his deathbed with smallpox. The mob was supposedly a contributing factor as he died the following day.

The Nathaniel Ropes Mansion in Central Salem is named for him.

Political offices
Preceded by Benjamin Lynde Jr.	Justice of the Massachusetts Supreme Judicial Court; 1772–1774	Succeeded by William Brown
