= Anthony's Pier 4 =

- Interactive map of Anthony's Pier 4

Restaurant information
- Established: 1963
- Closed: 2013
- Previous owner: Anthony Athanas
- Location: Boston, Massachusetts, U.S.
- Coordinates: 42.351°N 71.044°W

Anthony's Pier 4 was a restaurant on the South Boston waterfront opened in 1963 by restaurateur Anthony Athanas. In the 1980s, it was one of the highest-grossing restaurants in the United States. It closed in 2013, and the site was scheduled for redevelopment.

== History ==
Restaurateur Anthony Athanas opened Anthony's Pier 4 in 1963 and lived in an apartment above it. It served traditional American food emphasizing locally caught seafood; the dining room, with seating for 500, overlooked Boston Harbor on three sides. In 1968, Athanas bought a 1927 former Hudson River cruise ship, the SS Peter Stuyvesant, and brought it from New York to Boston, where a specially built concrete and steel cradle held it in place adjacent to the restaurant; it served as a private bar and dining room and held a wine cellar as well as art works and mementoes collected by Athanas. The ship broke free, capsized, and sank during the Blizzard of February 1978; after unsuccessful efforts to salvage it, in 1979, all but the hull was removed.

The restaurant shot to prominence when Elizabeth Taylor and Richard Burton ate there in 1964 while Richard Burton's Hamlet was at the Shubert Theatre. It was a prominent restaurant throughout its first two decades, attracting both out-of-town celebrities and Boston politicians. By the early 1980s, it was grossing about $12 million annually, making it one of the five highest-grossing restaurants in the United States.

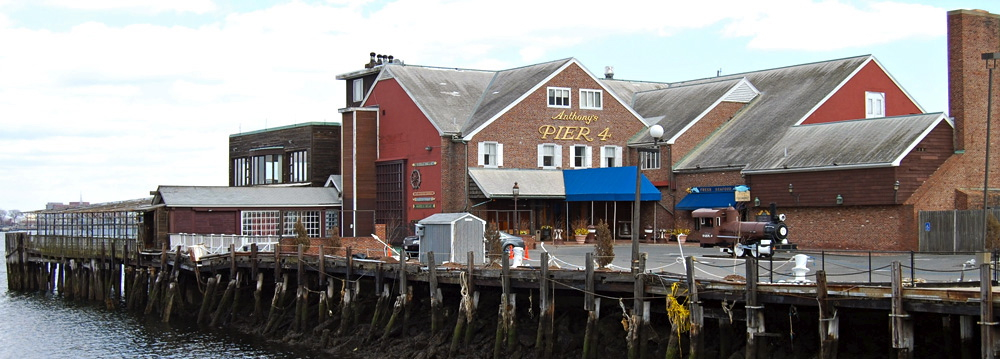
Anthony's Pier 4

Athanas died in 2005; the restaurant closed in 2013. A condominium tower was erected on the site of the parking lot, and in 2016–2017, the restaurant building was demolished, and the remains of the Stuyvesant were dredged up for scrap in early 2017. A multi-use complex on the site, including offices and condominiums, opened in 2018.

=== Winter Hill Gang murders ===
In 1982, Brian Halloran and Michael Donahue were murdered in the restaurant's parking lot by Whitey Bulger and another associate of the Winter Hill Gang. In 2014, Anthony's Pier 4 having closed, this murder was recreated at the Porthole in Lynn, Massachusetts for the 2015 film Black Mass.

=== Filming location ===
Norman Jewison's The Thomas Crown Affair, a 1968 film, was shot here for one of its dinner date scenes between Steve McQueen and Faye Dunaway.
