= General Glover Farmhouse =

- Interactive map of the General Glover Farmhouse area

General information
- Location: Swampscott, Massachusetts, 299 Salem Street
- Coordinates: 42°29′04″N 70°53′54″W
- Year built: 1700s

Design and construction
- Designations: Eligible National Historic Landmark

The General Glover Farmhouse, also known as the General Glover House, is a 1700s colonial house, and the final home to Revolutionary War hero General John Glover, located on the Marblehead - Swampscott - Salem border. The house sits on the historic 2.4 acre property, formerly known as the Glover Farm, that also contains a collection of other historic buildings representing different eras of the farms history. The site is one of the most significant and overlooked historic sites in the three communities, connected to many notable American figures and military heroes, with a history spanning over 300 years.

== History ==
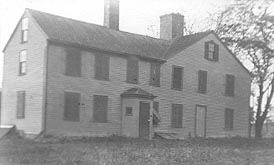
The main 1700s built General Glover Farmhouse

The main colonial farm house was originally built in 1700s prior to the American Revolution in what was then Salem, MA.

=== Browne Family Farm ===
The original extents of farmland was owned by William Browne of Salem. From a prominent Salem family, he was a graduate of Harvard College and friend and classmate of John Adams. He was a colonel of the Essex County militia in Salem, and was appointed as collector of the port of Salem.

William Browne accepted an appointment by General Gage as judge of the superior colonial court. Browne was a British Loyalist, and because of his connection to Gage, he was listed on the Banishment Act of 1778 and was forbidden to return to Massachusetts. This would lead to all his property, including the house and farmland being confiscated by the colonial Massachusetts government in 1780. Browne would flee to England, and would go on to be appointed the Royal Governor of Bermuda by Lord North.

=== General Glover's Farmhouse ===
In February 1781, General John Glover purchased the farmland from the Massachusetts state government, and then would later purchase the house. Glover was an American military hero, who helped create what would eventually become the U.S. Navy. He is most famous for leading the regiment that rowed Washington's troops across the Delaware, came to the rescue in the Battle of Long Island, and leading one of the first integrated regiments in the American Revolution.

John Glover paid 1369 pounds for the 180 acres of land to the state government. As recorded in Registry of Deeds:

Resolve on Petition of John Glover, Bridagadier General in the American Army: "Resolve that the committee for selling the estate of absentees in the County of Essex be, and they hereby are authorized and directed to appoint five sufficient freeholders in said Country, who are to be under oath, to appraise that part of William Brown(e), Esqrs., estate lately occupied by Thomas Vining and others, lying in Salem and Marblehead, in said Country, and said Committee are authorized and directed to give a deed to John Glover at said appeasement of said farm in behalf of this Commonwealth, and to take in pay notes given him by this State for his wages etc., which shall become payable in March next, at the real value, and the balance if any to be paid, in current money." (February 17, 1781)

Historic fireplace in the 1700s General Glover Farmhouse

John Glover moved to his farmhouse in 1782 after retiring from his military service, moving both his family and business to the house. While living in the house, he stayed active in politics, and was elected as a delegate to the Massachusetts ratifying convention for the U.S. Constitution, served as town selectman, and was in the Massachusetts House of Representatives.

Glover would welcome the Marquis de Lafayette who came to Marblehead in 1784. He would also lead the official welcome of President George Washington in 1789, who made a special detour and came to see his old army friend and thank those who served during the war.

Glover Farmhouse (on left) and outbuildings around 1910

John Glover would continue to live at the farm, and operate his business from the house. William Bentley would frequently join land surveys around Salem, and mentioned speaking with Glover about his proposal to build a canal via Forest River that would link his farm to the sea. This would permit his vessels to unload goods in Salem and bring them up in smaller boats to his store at the farm. However this was never realized. John Glover would live here the remainder of his life, until his death in January 1797.

After his death, the farm property was purchased by John Glover's daughter Mary and her husband Robert Hooper.

==== Transfer from Salem to Swampscott ====
The farm and house was eventually sold by the Glover descendants in the late 1800s. The land that the house sat on, the "Salem Gore", a strip of land that ran from present day Vinnin Square to Preston Beach, would be transferred from Salem to the town of Swampscott in 1867.

=== General Glover Inn ===
In the 20th century, the house eventually became the General Glover Inn, owned by shoe manufacturer Alexander Little and his wife Lillian Little from Lynn, MA. Alexander Little was the founder of A.E. Little & Co. maker of the famous Sorosis shoes. They restored the historic house, uncovering many of the original colonial elements. They themselves would live in the transformed former barn that sits behind the Glover Farmhouse. The Inn would be part of the larger Sunbeam farm, and lasted until the 1950s.

General Glover Inn brochure cover showing the historic facade of the original house.

=== The General Glover House ===
In 1957 the house opened as the General Glover House restaurant by Anthony Athanas Various additions were added on to the main house, with the multiple dining rooms and bars themed to a colonial inn. The restaurant closed in the 1990s, and remains vacant until this day.

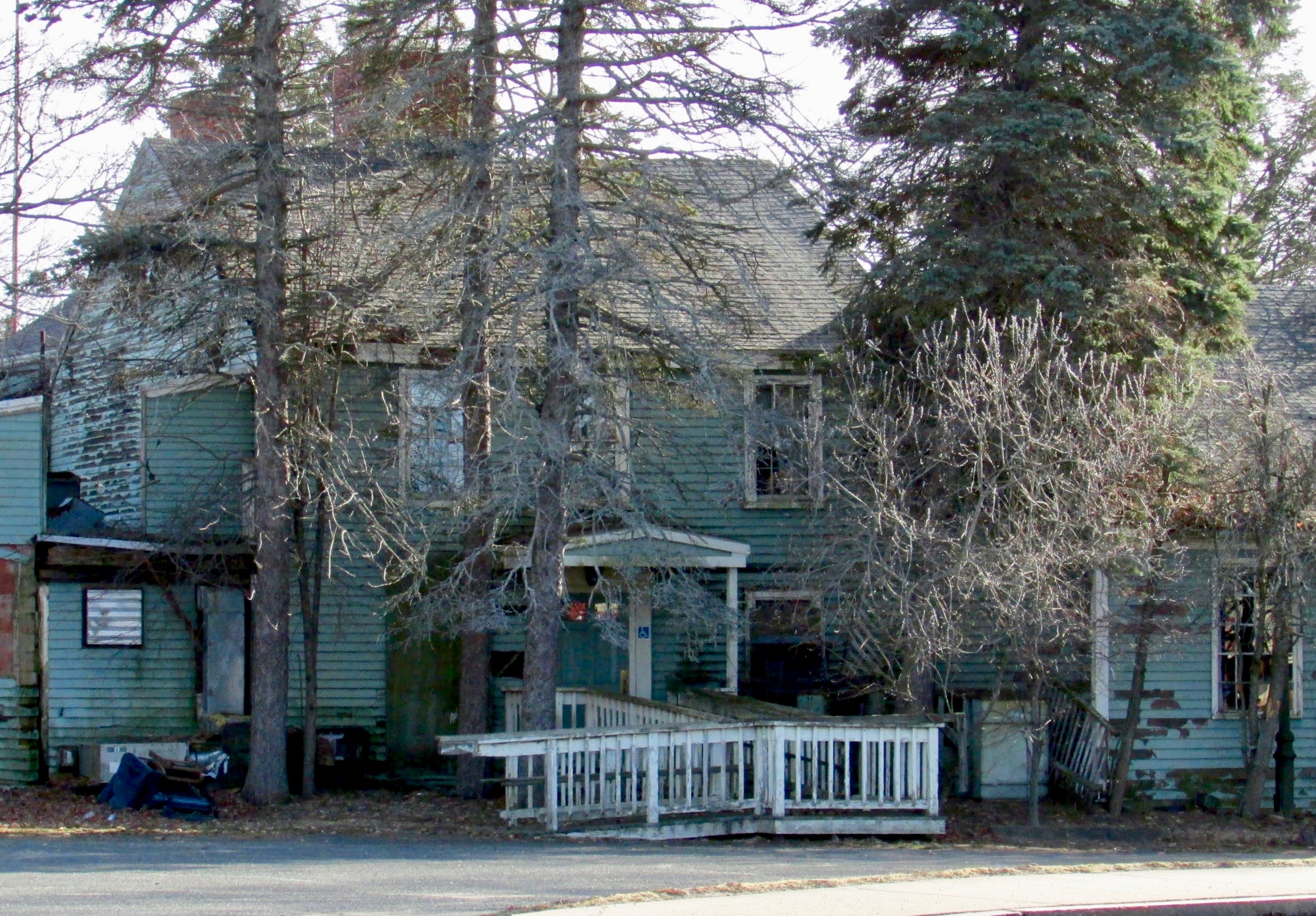
Present day facade of historic 1700s Glover House

=== Threat of demolition ===
In 2020 the property was deemed "blighted" and the Athanas family was given a deadline to address the safety concerns of the abandoned property.

In 2022 a 140-unit condominium was proposed by Leggatt McCall Properties to be built on the land spanning Swampscott and Marblehead. The proposed site plans did not reflect saving the original historic 1700s farmhouse of revolutionary war veteran General Glover, or any of the other historic buildings on site. The developer's representatives indicated that there were no buildings on the site that could be saved. This influenced the planning boards of the three communities to base their approvals on the incorrect assessment of the buildings condition, history, and the ability to restore them.

In April 2023, the Swampscott Historical Commission issued a demolition delay after determining the house was historically significant and could be saved after performing their own independent structural investigation.

In 2025, a new developer, National Development bid to purchase the property, after the first developer walked away from the project. This prompted the owner, the Athanas Family, to file for a demolition permit in July 2025 targeting just the Glover Farmhouse. This occurred despite the Town of Swampscott's initiative of obtaining preservation grants and bringing awareness of the historic importance of the house, while attempting to work with the owner to collaborate and incorporate the house into any future development. The Swamspcott Historical Commission issued a second demolition 9 month delay that expires on July 20, 2026. National Development indicated they would consider options to keep the house on site, but only if the desired number of units for their proposed residential development could be met.

=== Preservation Efforts ===
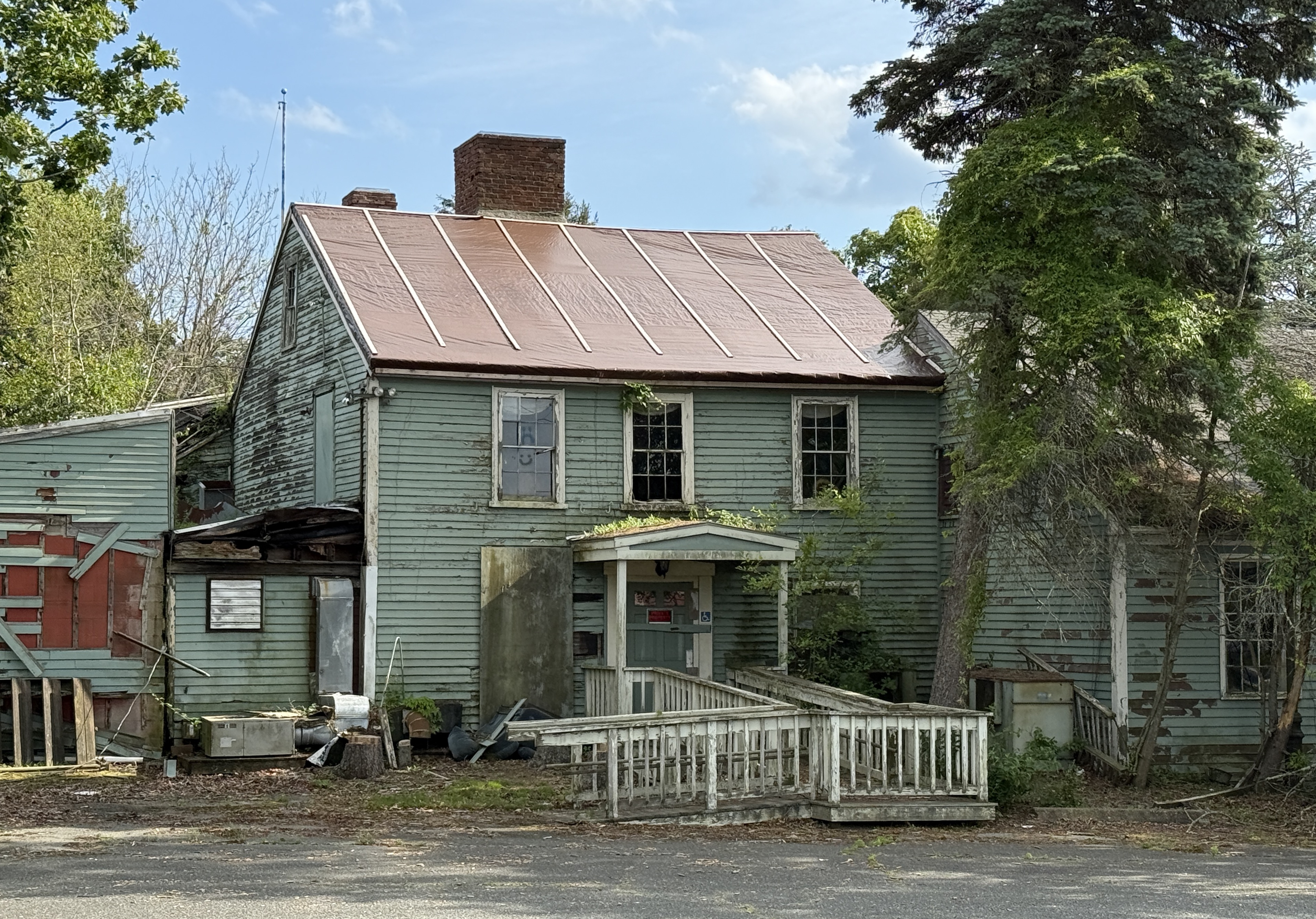
General Glover Farmhouse in 2025

The historical commissions of Swampscott and Marblehead, along with other organizations including Glover's Marblehead Regiment, began working together to help save the historic military heroes home from demolition. A survey determined the original 1700s home was still intact and able to be saved and restored. A joint preservation effort of "Save the Glover" was initiated to help raise awareness to save and preserve the historic Glover House.In 2024, American Heritage Magazine, David Shribman and other national publications helped promote awareness of the houses history, and the importance to save the house.

Recognizing the importance of the Glover Farmhouse to local, national, and military history, the Town of Swampscott allocated funding for structural engineers to come up with stabilization plan, along with having a tarp placed over the roof to help prevent further deterioration. The property is currently up for sale after the first developer walked away from the project. However, the house is still threatened by demolition, both through neglect by its current owners, and the approved plans could be purchased by a new developer.

In October 2025, Preservation Massachusetts listed the General Glover Farmhouse as one of the Commonwealth's Most Endangered Historic Resources due to the threat of neglect and demolition.

The house was added to the Library of Congress ensure a historic record was kept due to the importance to American history. Towards the end of 2025 in to 2026 community advocacy continued to support the preservation effort, including pledges from the Odd Fellows, anonymous donations up to $50k, and letter of support for the preservation effort from filmmaker Ken Burns. One June 2, 2026 a statement was introduced to the House of Representatives emphasizing the importance of saving the Glover Farmhouse to our American history, especially during America's 250th.

As of 2026, the historic 1700s Glover Farmhouse, along with many of the other historic buildings remain intact on the property at 299 Salem Street, but are neglected and deteriorating.

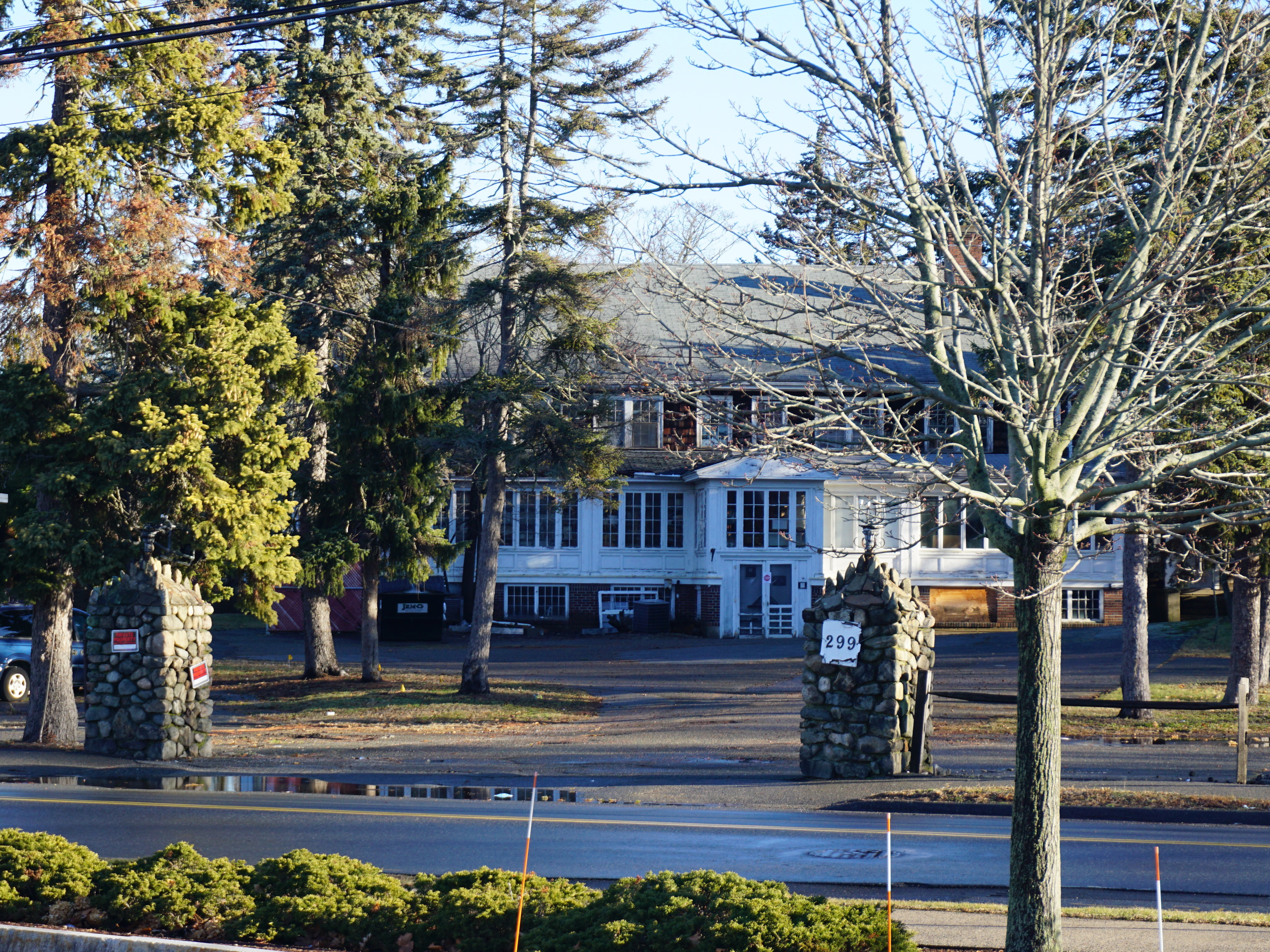
Historic gate posts on Glover Farm property, with the former barn and A.E. Little House beyond.

== Notable owners ==
Throughout its over 250 year history, the Glover Farm site has been owned by many significant New England figures and their families:

- William Browne
- General John Glover
- Alexander E. Little
- Anthony Athanas

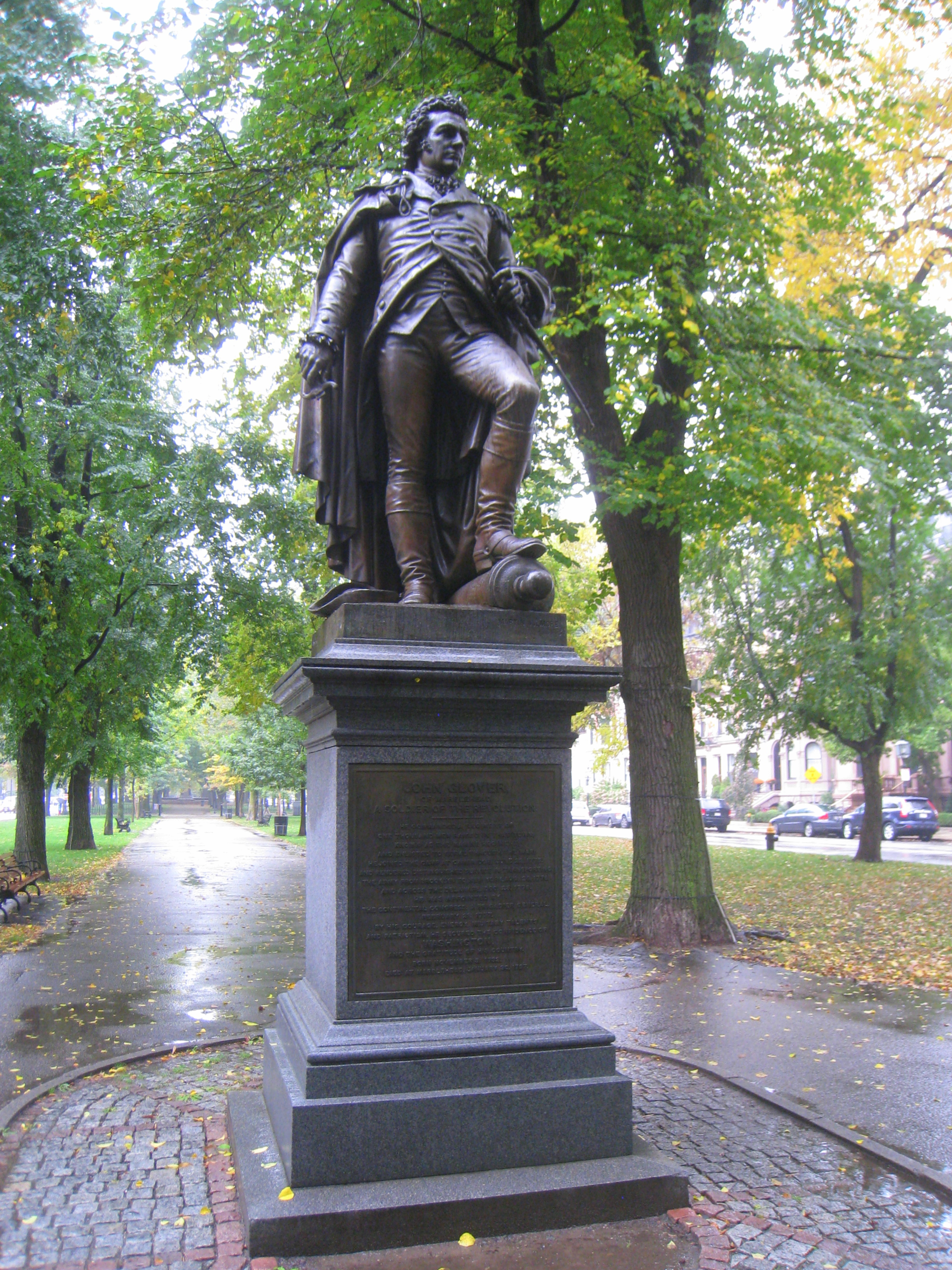
Statue of General John Glover in Boston, who retired to the Glover Farm after his military service.
