= Anthony Athanas =

Albanian American restaurateur and philanthropist

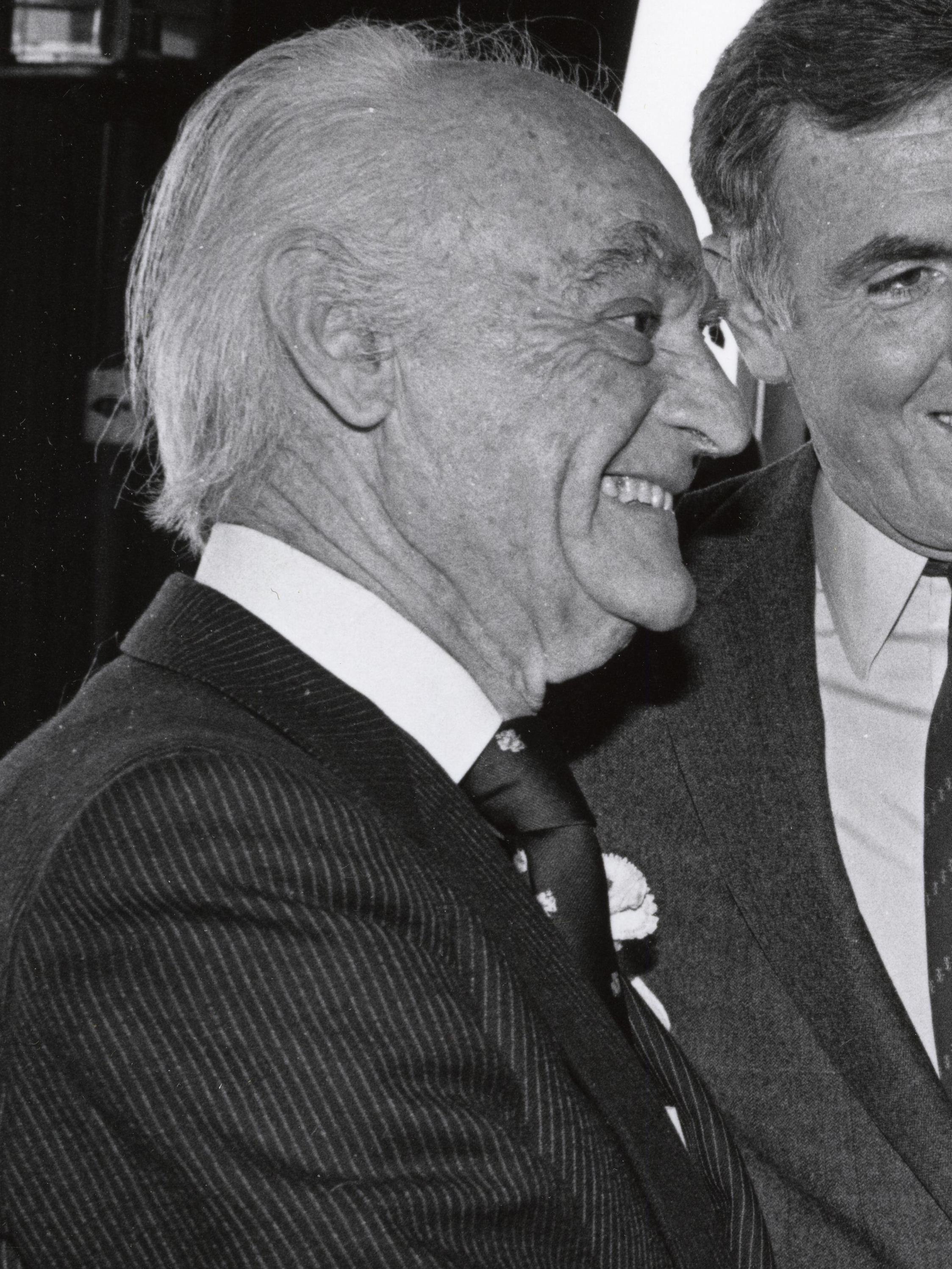
- Born: July 28, 1911; Korçë, Manastir Vilayet, Ottoman Empire (present-day Albania)
- Died: May 20, 2005 (aged 93); Swampscott, Massachusetts, USA
- Burial place: Swampscott, Massachusetts, USA
- Occupation: Restaurateur
- Known for: Anthony's Pier 4, one of the most successful restaurants in the USA
- Spouse: Esther (Mitchell) Athanas

Anthony Athanas (July 28, 1911 – May 20, 2005) was a multi-millionaire Albanian American restaurateur and philanthropist. His restaurants included Anthony's Pier 4, known throughout United States. In 1976 the National Restaurant Association named him Restaurateur of the Year.

== Life ==
Born in Korçë, southern Albania, then part of the Manastir Vilayet of the Ottoman Empire, on July 28, 1911, Athanas and his mother Evangeline traveled on a donkey to a port and emigrated to Bedford, New York in 1915–16, where his father, who was a mason, and siblings had settled. At the age of thirteen Athanas left school and worked in several restaurants until 1938, when he bought his first restaurant: Anthony's Hawthorne Café in Lynn, Massachusetts. He would go on to open four more highly successful restaurants, including the General Glover House and Anthony's Pier 4 in Boston.

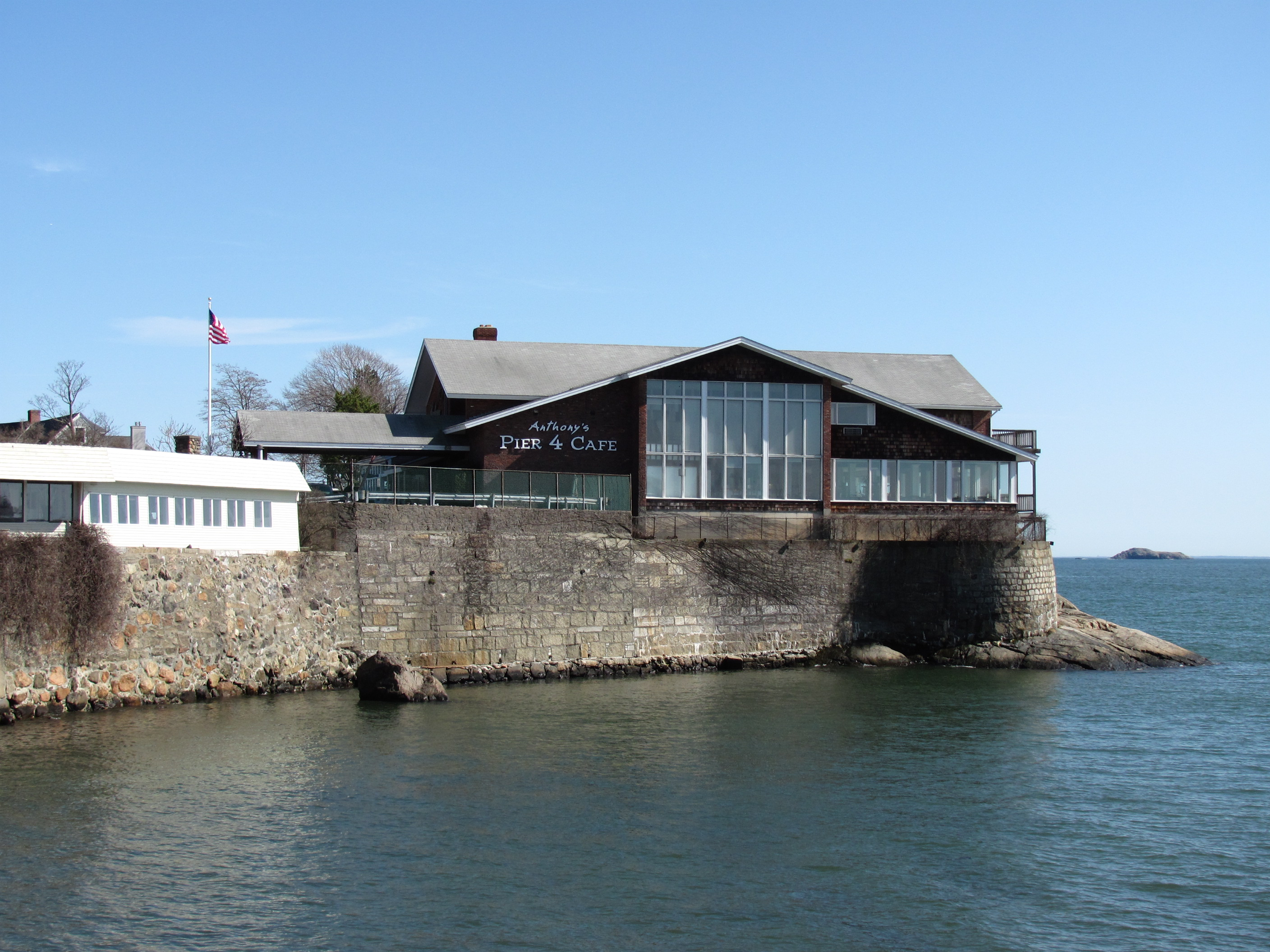
Anthony's Pier 4 Cafe and Hawthorne by-the-sea Tavern in Swampscott (2010). It closed in 2025.

Athanas had also served as president of Massachusetts's Restaurant Association, a member of the board of the National Restaurant Association, while in 1976 he was named "Restaurateur of the Year".

In 1999 during the Kosovo War, he became a member of the congressional delegation of the United States, Albania, Kosovo, and Macedonia. Although Athanas had no formal education he was a popular lecturer at Harvard Business School, the University of New Hampshire and Cornell University, and was awarded the "Horatio Alger Award" by the Horatio Alger Association of Distinguished Americans in 1978.

== Death ==
He died at his Swampscott home on May 20, 2005, of Alzheimer's disease at the age of 93. The funeral was held at St. George Albanian Orthodox Cathedral in South Boston. He is buried with his wife in Swampscott Cemetery in Swampscott, Massachusetts.

== Restaurants ==
Anthony Athanas operated five restaurants in Boston and the north shore in his lifetime. Anthony's Hawthorne Café in Lynn, Massachusetts, which by the early 1950s had become the highest-grossing restaurant in Massachusetts, with profits of more than $1 million annually. In 1963, he opened Anthony's Pier 4, which by the early 1980s was grossing about $12 million annually and was the highest-grossing restaurant in the United States. His other restaurants included the Hawthorne by-the-sea Tavern and The General Glover House in Swampscott, Massachusetts, and Anthony's Cummaquid Inn in Yarmouth Port.

Name	Location	Years in Operation	Status
Anthony’s Hawthorne	Lynn, MA	1937 - 2003	Closed, left derelict, demolished in 2019
Hawthorne by the Sea	Swampscott, MA	1946-2025	Property sold to the Town of Swampscott, restaurant closed
General Glover House	Swampscott, MA	1957 - 1996	Closed, left derelict
Anthony's Pier 4	Boston, MA	1963 - 2013	Closed, demolished in 2016
Anthony’s Cummaquid Inn	Yarmouth Port, MA	1975 - 2016	Closed, left derelict, destroyed by fire in 2024
