= Night of the Moonjellies =

Children's picture book by Mark Shasha

- Purple House Press, 2007 (edition displayed)
- Author: Mark Shasha
- Cover artist: Mark Shasha
- Language: English
- Genre: Children's literature
- Publisher: Simon & Schuster, Purple House Press (2007 reissue)
- Publication date: 1992
- Publication place: United States
- ISBN: 978-1930900349

Night of the Moonjellies is a children's picture book written and illustrated by Mark Shasha. This book was published by Simon & Schuster in the year 1992

== About The Book ==
The book was inspired by the author's memories of working at his grandmother's hot dog stand by the sea in New London, Connecticut in the 1970s. It features the warm relationship between the main character, a boy of 7 years old, and his grandmother, along with the hustle and bustle of the busy day at the hot dog stand.

Night of the Moonjellies also features a small, jelly-like creature found in the North Atlantic called a moonjelly. Also commonly known as a comb jelly this animal is capable of bioluminescence. Its scientific name is ctenophore (pronounced 'tee-ne-for').

== Awards ==
The book won a Marion Vannett Ridgway Award, is featured in many educational programs and has been reprinted in several editions. In its review Smithsonian Magazine said it "was sure to become a classic."^{1} Mark Shasha's artwork from "Night of the Moonjellies" has been exhibited in several museums and galleries since 1992.

== Adaptations ==
Singer/songwriter Steve Elci has expressed interest in creating the score should the book ever be made into a film.^{2}
