= Richard Rubin (writer) =

American writer (born 1967)

- Born: 1967 (age 58–59); New York City
- Education: University of Pennsylvania; Boston University
- Occupation: Writer
- Writing career
- Language: English
- Notable works: The Last of the Doughboys: The Forgotten Generation And Their Forgotten World War Confederacy of Silence: A True Tale of the New Old South Back Over There: One American Time-Traveler, 100 Years Since the Great War, 500 Miles of Battle-Scarred French Countryside, and Too Many Trenches, Shells, Legends and Ghosts to Count
- Website: richardrubinonline.com

Richard Rubin (born 1967) is an American writer. He has published essays, articles, and short stories in a number of newspapers and magazines. He is perhaps best known as the author of The Last of the Doughboys: The Forgotten Generation and Their Forgotten World War, a history of America and World War I based upon interviews he conducted with its last veterans, and Confederacy of Silence: A True Tale of the New Old South, a personal memoir about the year he spent living and working as a newspaper reporter in the rural Mississippi Delta.

Rubin is also known for his many short pieces, including "The Ghosts of Emmett Till", an acclaimed article he published in The New York Times Magazine in 2005, in which he revisits interviews he conducted in 1995 with the two surviving defense attorneys and the two surviving jurors from the 1955 Sumner, Mississippi, trial of Roy Bryant and J.W. Milam, white men who were ultimately acquitted of the murder of the black 14-year old Emmett Till, despite overwhelming evidence of their guilt. Bryant and Milam later confessed to the murder in an interview with journalist William Bradford Huie for Look Magazine. "The Ghosts of Emmett Till" was anthologized in The Best American Crime Writing 2006. In 2014, Rubin wrote a series of pieces for The New York Times, for which he visited various American World War I battlefields in France. The series, titled "Over There", was published in four installments between August and December, 2014; the final installment, titled "In France, Vestiges of the Great War's Bloody End", which deals with the Meuse-Argonne, was for a time the most emailed article in the newspaper.

== Biography ==
=== Early life and education ===
Rubin was born in Manhattan and raised in Westchester County, New York. He attended the University of Pennsylvania, where he majored in history, graduating with honors in 1988. In 1991, he received a Master's in Creative Writing from Boston University, where he studied under Leslie Epstein.

=== Career ===
Rubin published his first short story, "November," in the Oxford American in 1995. That same year, he published the first of several pieces in the "Talk of the Town" section of The New Yorker, including one about sledding down West End Avenue during the Blizzard of 1996. In July, 1996 he published his first essay in the Atlantic Monthly, "Welcome to Our Tomb," a meditation on Grant's Tomb and the unexpected things visitors write in the guest register there. The piece was republished in condensed form in Reader's Digest that December, under the title "What's Written in Grant's Tomb." Rubin would go on to write publish more than a dozen pieces in the Atlantic, most of them dealing with historical subjects or things that are about to disappear. One notable exception is "It's Radi-O!", a meditation on the significance of that medium. One Atlantic piece, "The Colfax Riot," appeared in the magazine's July/August 2003 issue and is said to have been the inspiration for journalist Charles Lane's book on the same subject, "The Day Freedom Died."

Rubin has published pieces in numerous publications, including The New York Times magazine, New York magazine, Smithsonian, PARADE, and a series of essays for AARP magazine. In 2007, he was an Op-Ed Contributor to The New York Times with his Veteran's Day piece "Over There — and Gone Forever," about the last surviving American World War I veteran; the Times named it one of a handful of Notable Op-Eds for that year. From 2008 to 2010, he was the Viebranz Visiting Professor of Creative Writing at St. Lawrence University in Canton, New York.

== Personal life ==
Rubin lives in Maine.

== Notable works ==
=== Confederacy of Silence: A True Tale of the New Old South ===
Confederacy of Silence: A True Tale of the New Old South is a book by Richard Rubin. A true story and national bestseller, it was first published in 2002 by Atria, Simon & Schuster. The book is 448 pages long and available in hardcover, softcover, and eBook. ISBN 978-0-671-03667-6.

=== The Last of the Doughboys ===
The Last of the Doughboys is a conversational history of America's experience in World War I as recalled by its last surviving veterans, published by Houghton Mifflin in 2013. ISBN 0-547-55443-5. Rubin tracked down and interviewed dozens of surviving American World War I veterans for the book. He recorded these interviews on video.

== Selected works ==
- "The mall of fame". Notes & Comment. The Atlantic Monthly. 280 (1): 14–18. July 1997.
- Confederacy of Silence: A True Tale of the New Old South (2002)
- The Last of the Doughboys (2013)
- Back Over There: One American Time-Traveler, 100 Years Since the Great War, 500 Miles of Battle-Scarred French Countryside, and Too Many Trenches, Shells, Legends and Ghosts to Count (2017)
