= Mark Shasha =

American painter

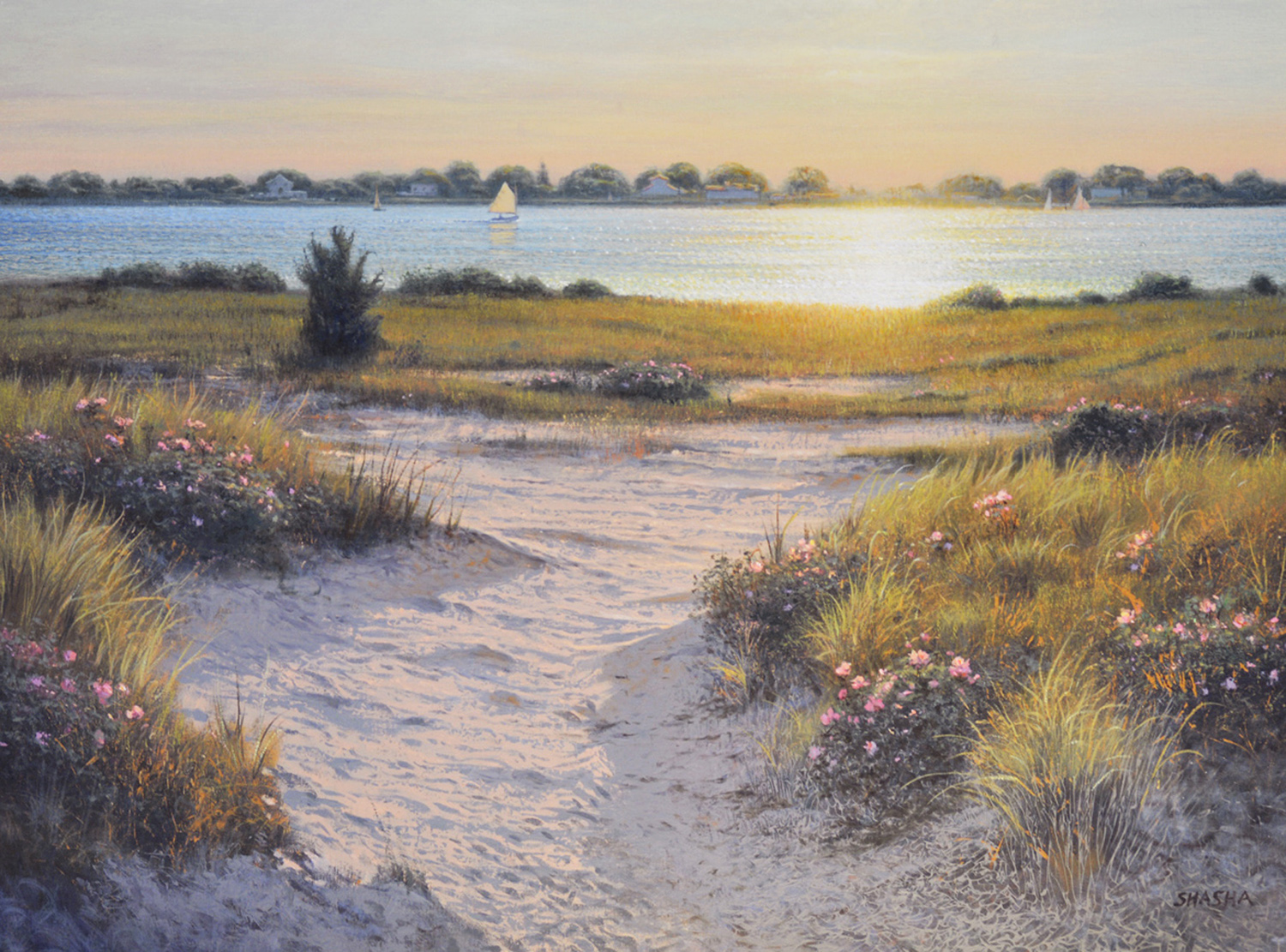
"Summer Dream" by Mark Shasha, 2010

Mark Shasha (born 1961) is an American artist. He is also an author, illustrator and educator. His subjects are often familiar and are usually inspired by the textures and light found along the New England coast where he lives and works.

Shasha studied art at Rhode Island School of Design where he received his B.F.A in 1983. His artwork has been seen in museums, galleries and dozens of publications for three decades. His paintings have appeared in more than 50 notable exhibitions from Hollywood, California to the Lyman Allyn Art Museum in Connecticut and the Society of Illustrators in New York City.

== Children's books ==
Mark Shasha began his career in art as a writer and illustrator with The Boston Phoenix, the Boston Globe and several other publications. His first book, the children's classic^{1} Night of the Moonjellies (Simon & Schuster, 1992) was inspired by childhood memories of working at his family's hot dog stand by the sea in New London, Connecticut in the early 1970s.

The story features a warm relationship between a boy and his grandmother along with a variety of characters busy with the hustle and bustle of the fast food business. It also features a bioluminescent jelly-like creature found in the North Atlantic called a moonjelly or Ctenophore (pronounced 'tee ne for').

Another book by Shasha, The Hall of Beasts (Simon & Schuster, 1994), an unusual story about a mysterious mural in an abandoned inn by the sea, did not fare quite as well commercially.

== Early influences ==
N.C. Wyeth, Chris Van Allsburg, Edward Hopper, Winslow Homer and John Singer Sargent

== Partial bibliography ==
- Night of the Moonjellies
- The Hall of Beasts
