= Edward R. Grabow =

Edward R. Grabow (September 17, 1875 – September 11, 1933) was an American hotelier who managed The New Ocean House and was an executive with the United Fruit Company.

== Early life ==
Grabow was born on September 17, 1875, in Cleveland to Frederick and Mary (Church) Grabow. He attended Cleveland public schools and remained in the city until the age of 17, when he moved to North Dakota to work as a cattle rancher.

== Career ==
At the age of 21, Grabow began his career in the hotel business at the Ponce de Leon Hotel in St. Augustine, Florida. He held various positions at The Stillman in Cleveland, The Auditorium in Chicago, The Cataract in Niagara Falls, New York, the Hotel Touraine in Boston, and was the chief clerk at the Hotel Magnolia in Magnolia, Massachusetts and the Hotel Preston Swampscott, Massachusetts. As the Magnolia and Preston were only open during the summer, Grabow would work at the Highland Park Hotel in Aiken, South Carolina during the winter. In 1900, Grabow received his first management position at The Buckminster in Boston.

In 1902, Grabow and Allen Ainslie purchased the Ocean House in Swampscott, Massachusetts. The pair enlarged, renovated, and redecorated the building, which they renamed The New Ocean House. Grabow managed the New Ocean House until 1926, when he turned over control to Clement Kennedy.

By 1908, Grabow & Ainslie were managing The Lenox, Brewster, Empire, and Tuileries hotels in Boston and the Hotel Titchfield in Port Antonio, Jamaica in addition to the New Ocean House. That same year, Grabow, Luke M. Boomer, and Harry Merry assumed management of the Gotham Hotel.

In 1910 the Titchfield was destroyed by fire. It was rebuilt by the United Fruit Company, which retained Grabow to manage it. In 1914, Grabow was appointed passenger manager of the United Fruit Company, which placed him in charge of the company's hotels and the dining and steward service aboard its Great White Fleet. He remained with United Fruit until 1927.

On September 11, 1933, died of a heart attack at the Hotel Kenmore Hall in New York City. He was survived by his wife and three daughters.
