= New Ocean House =

- Interactive map of the New Ocean House area

General information
- Location: Swampscott, Massachusetts
- Coordinates: 42°27′53″N 70°54′14″W
- Opening: 1888
- Closed: 1969
- Owner: Ainslie & Grabow (1902–09); Edward R. Grabow (1909–29); Clement Kennedy (1929–59); Harold A. Rudnick (1959–65); George Rohrborough (1965–69)

Technical details
- Floor count: 5

Other information
- Number of rooms: 300

The New Ocean House was an American hotel located in Swampscott, Massachusetts.

The hotel was built in 1888 to replace an earlier hotel that had been destroyed by fire. In 1902 it was purchased by Allen Ainslie of the Maplewood Hotel in Bethlehem, New Hampshire and Edward R. Grabow of The Buckminster, who enlarged, renovated, and refurnished the building, which they renamed the New Ocean House. The pair added 50 rooms (34 of which had private bathrooms) to bring the total to 210. The entire first floor was redone and included an elegant rotunda and lobby. Electricity was run throughout the entire building. In 1922, a steel and concrete annex was completed, bringing the total number of rooms to 300. By 1923, the property had grown from 3 acres to 19, was doing $400,000 worth of business annually, and valued at $1.3 million. From 1926 to 1959 the New Ocean House was run by Clement Kennedy, who managed the New Ocean House during the summer and Vinoy Park Hotel in St. Petersburg, Florida during the winter.

The New Ocean House had a private beach directly in front of the hotel, 25 acres of lawns and gardens, a saltwater swimming pool, tennis courts, and a pitch and putt course. The first floor contained a butcher shop, fish market, barber shop, bakery, drug store, tailor, and laundry. It was a center of social activity on the North Shore, hosting dances, conventions, reunions, concert, vaudeville shows, and tennis tournaments. Rudy Vallée performed at the New Ocean House early in his career.

The hotel hosted a number of celebrities, including Will Rogers, Harpo Marx, Lucille Ball, Helen Keller, Faith Baldwin, Alexander Woollcott, Louise Whitfield Carnegie, Babe Ruth, Florence Chadwick, John F. Kennedy, William Jennings Bryan, Henry F. Ashurst, and Carlos P. Romulo. It also served as headquarters for White House staff during Calvin Coolidge’s 1925 stay at nearby White Court, during John Aspinwall Roosevelt and Anne Lindsay Clark's 1938 wedding in Nahant, Massachusetts, and during the 1941 Atlantic Charter conference between Franklin D. Roosevelt and Winston Churchill.

In 1959, the hotel was purchased by a group led by Boston industrialist Harold A. Rudnick. In 1965 it was sold to Dr. George Rohrborough.

On May 8, 1969, the New Ocean House was destroyed by a fire. There were no guests at the time of the fire and only a clerk and three kitchen workers were in the building when the fire started. The fire started in the rear of the building and the first alarm was struck at 9:53 p.m. The hotel's sprinkler system and misty air helped suppress the fire and firefighters initially thought the fire could be contained. However, intense heat forced them back and the fire spread along the roof to the front of the building. Firefighting efforts were hampered by narrow streets and low water pressure and by 12:30 a.m. the fire had spread across the entire 300-foot front of the building. By 1 am the fire was out of control. Crews from 25 communities fought the blaze, which was not put out until 2:48 p.m. on May 10. No cause was determined, however a hotel spokesperson stated that it may have started in a staging area erected for plumbing work. After the fire, the hotel was replaced by 30 houses in 2 streets. Puritan Rd(where the entrance/lobby was)to Sutton Pl(the middle to back part of the hotel)

== Gallery ==
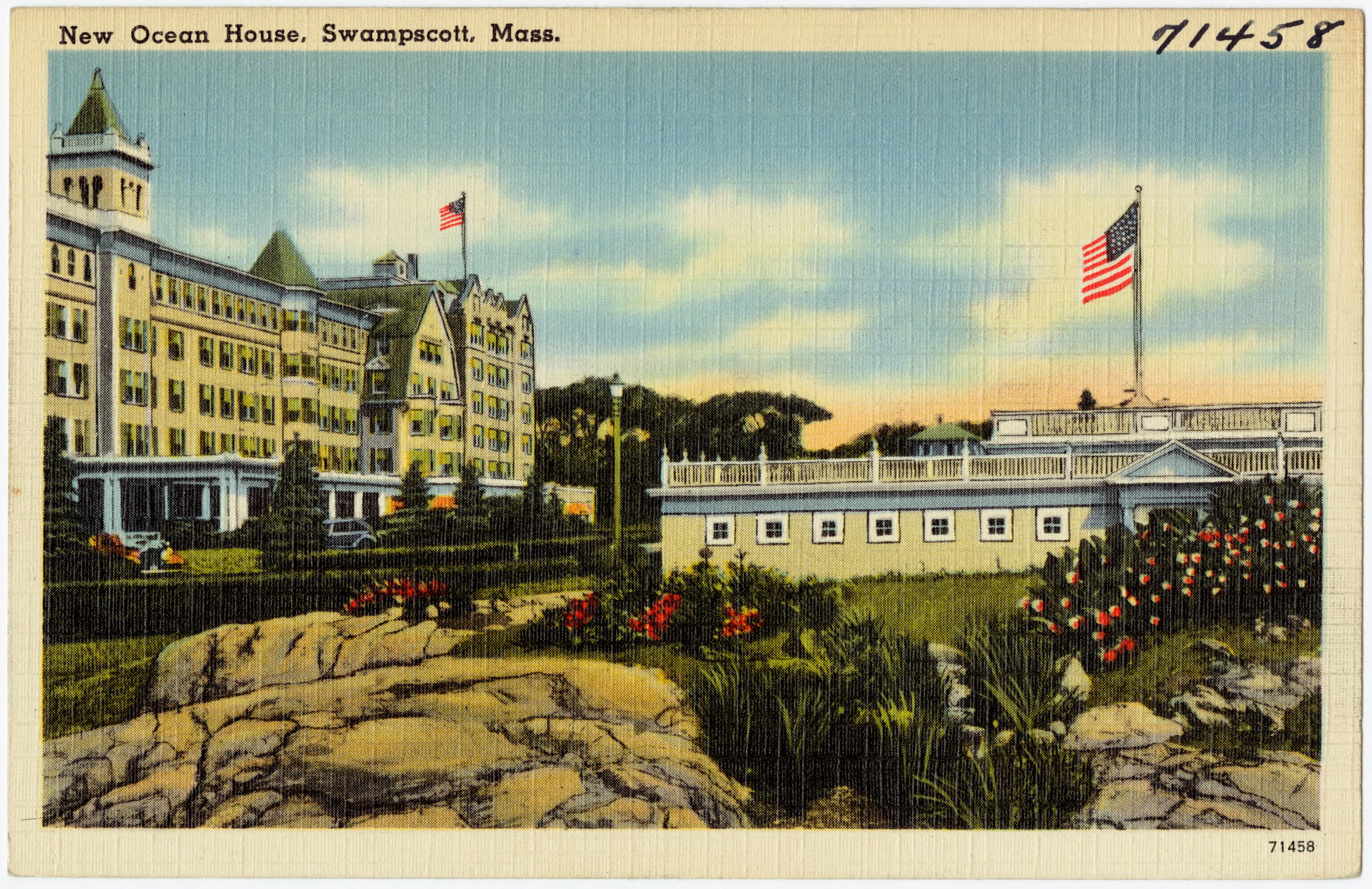

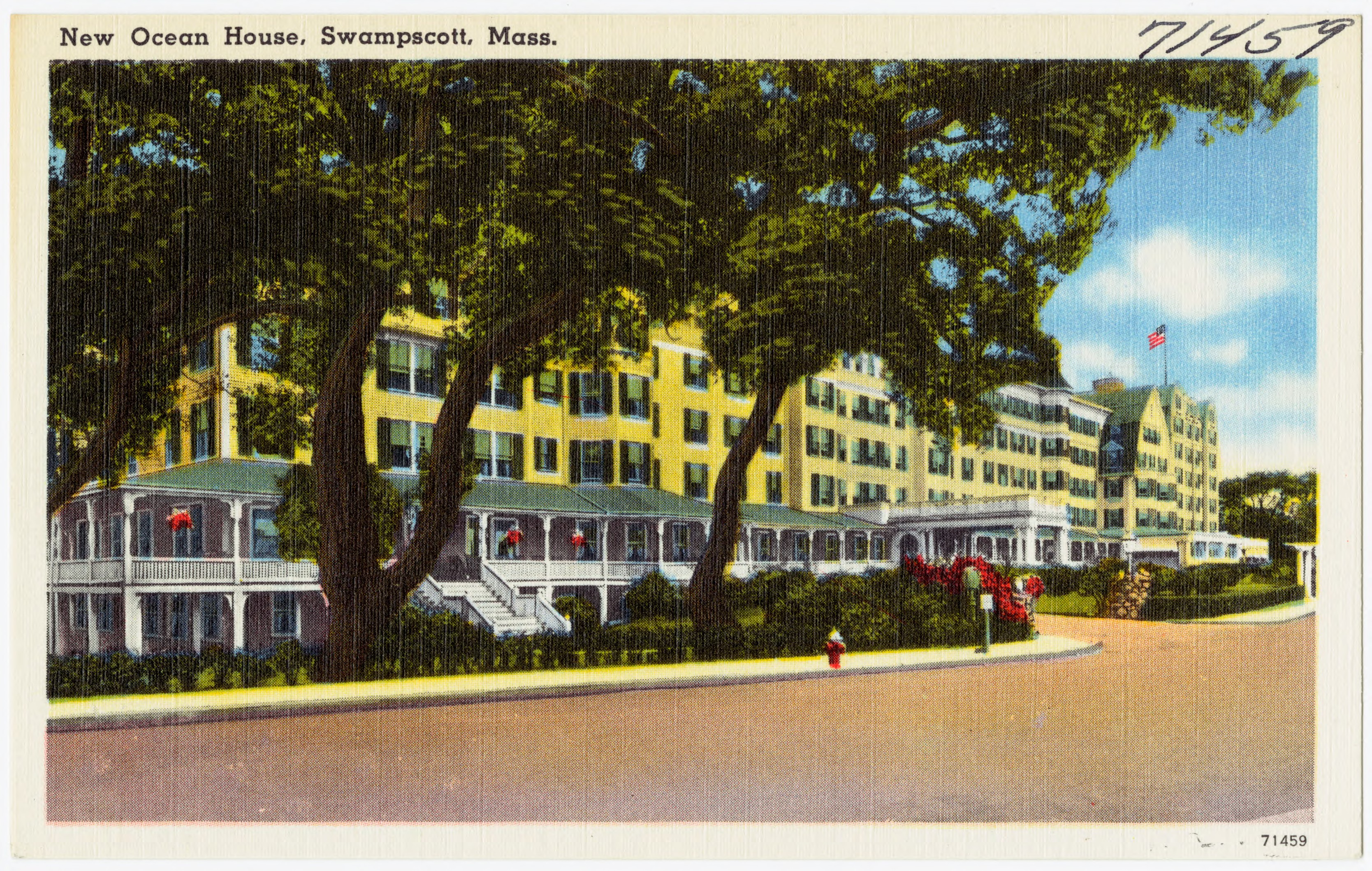

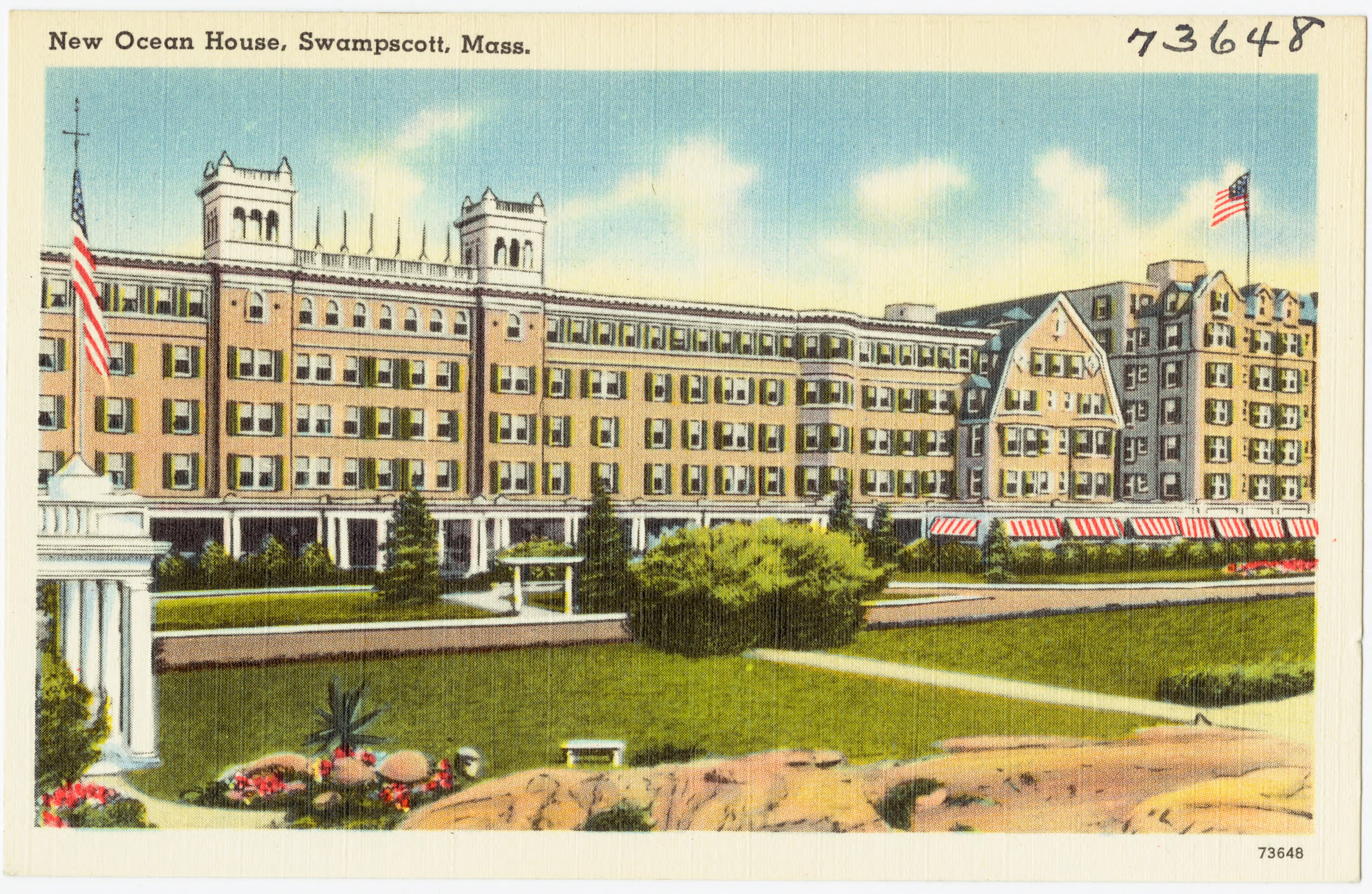

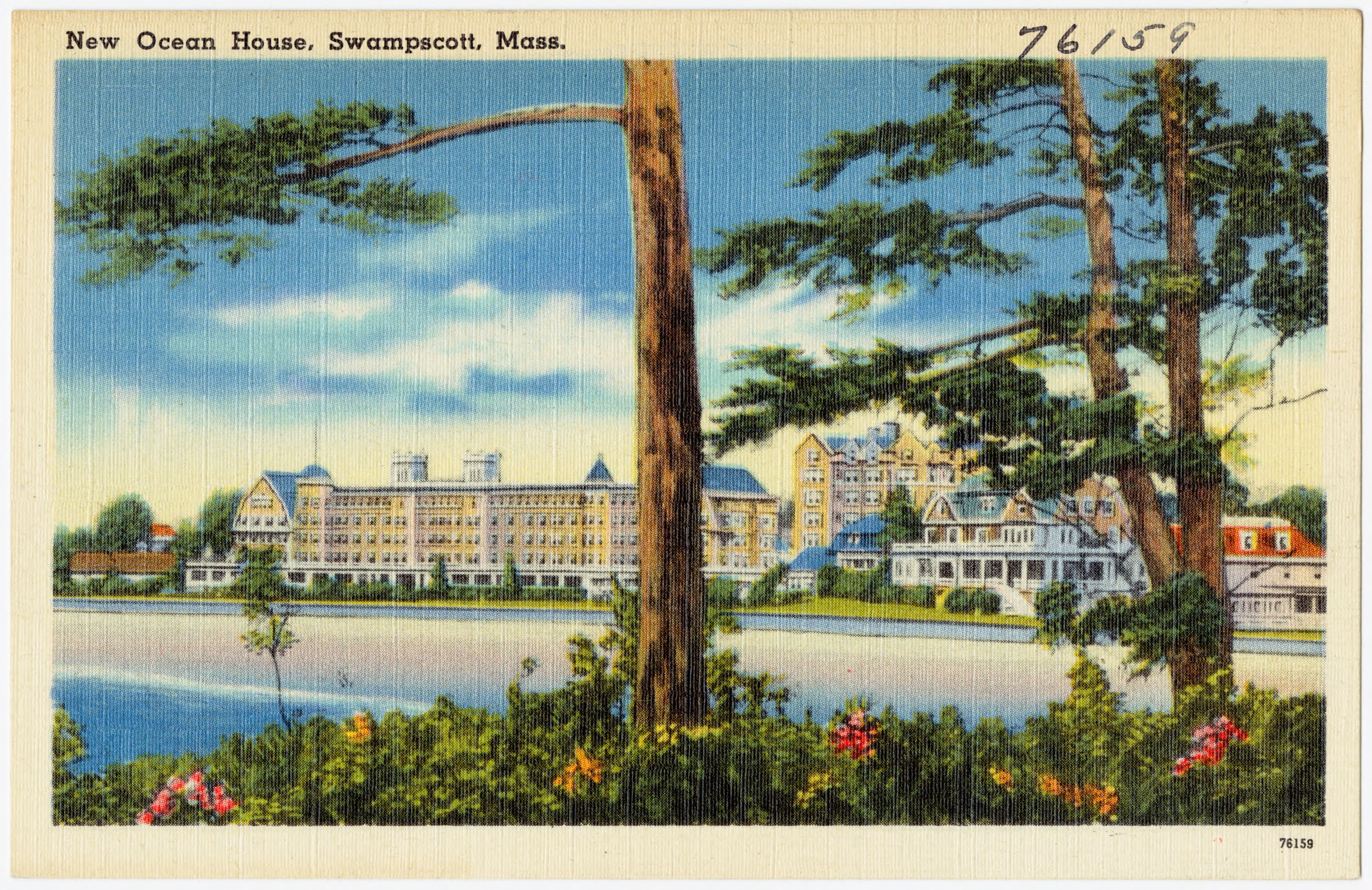

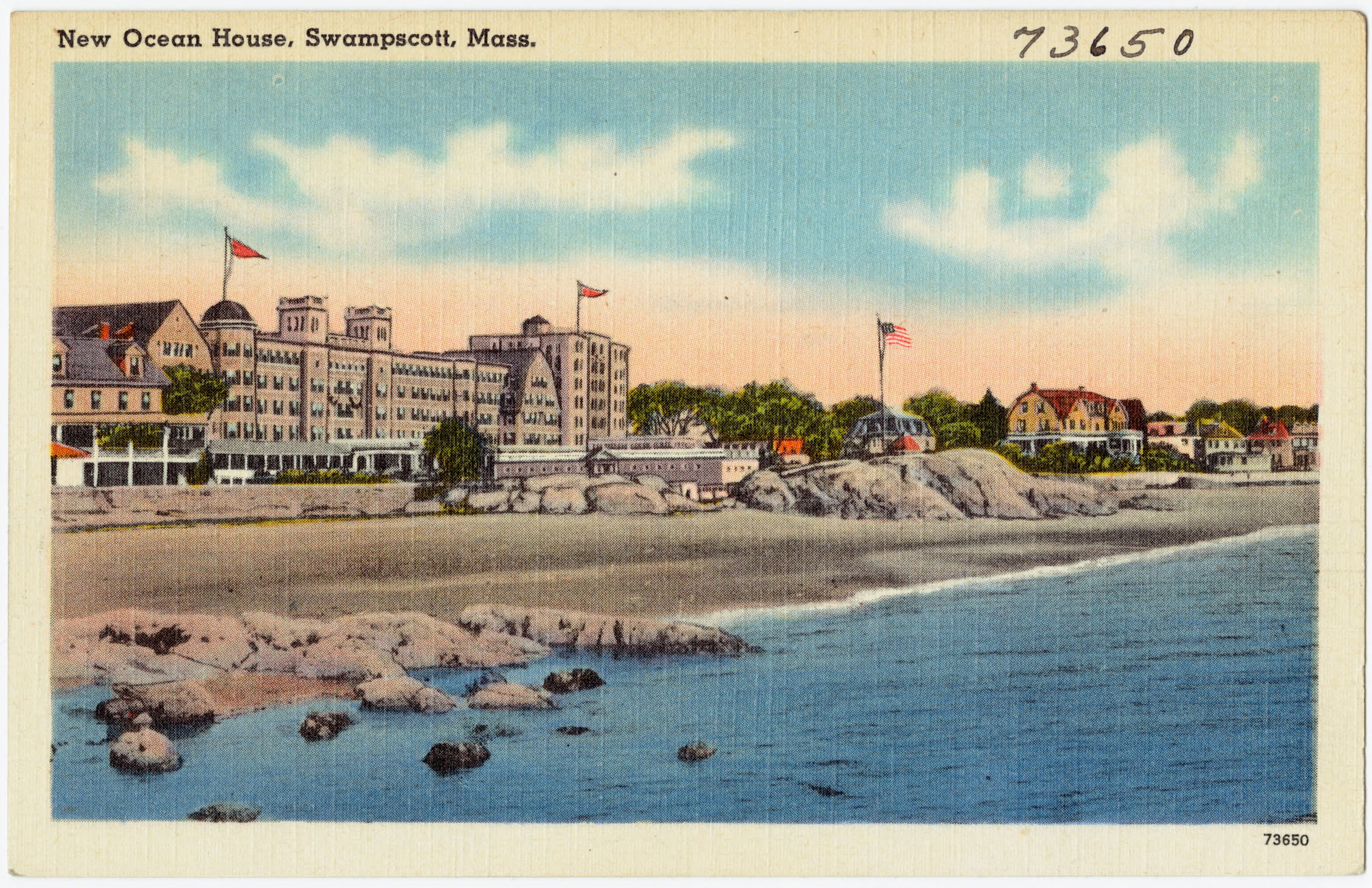

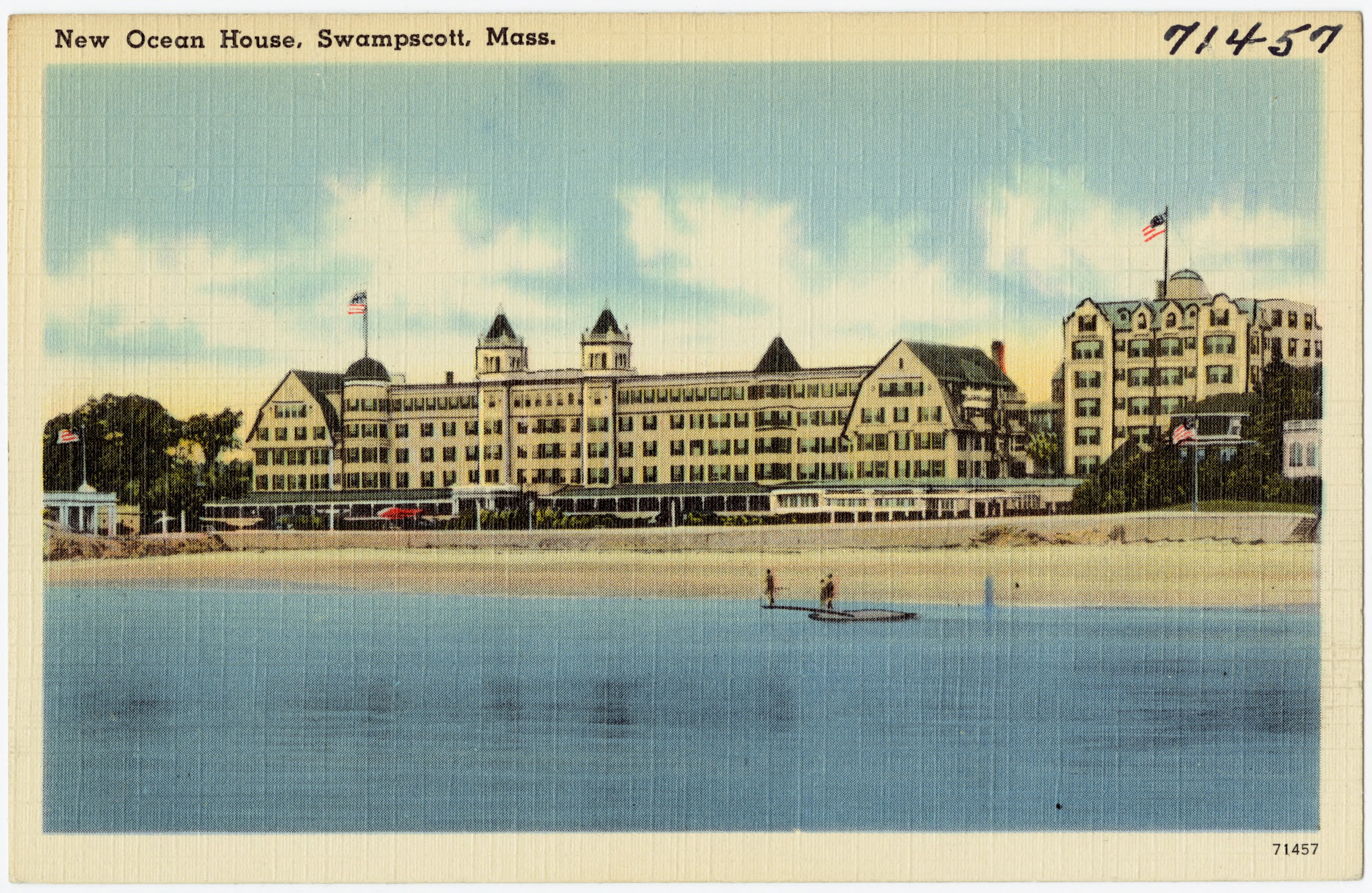

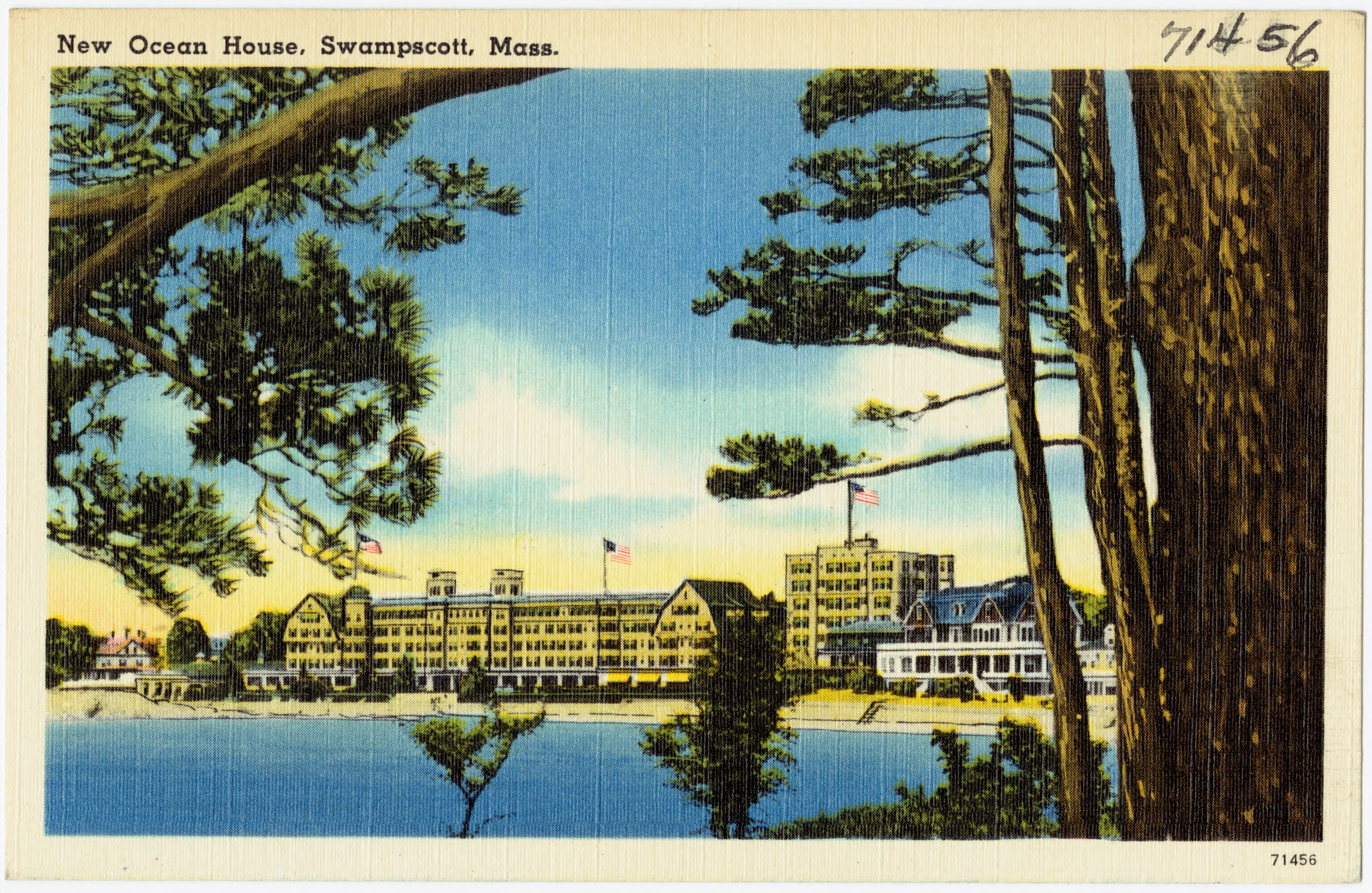

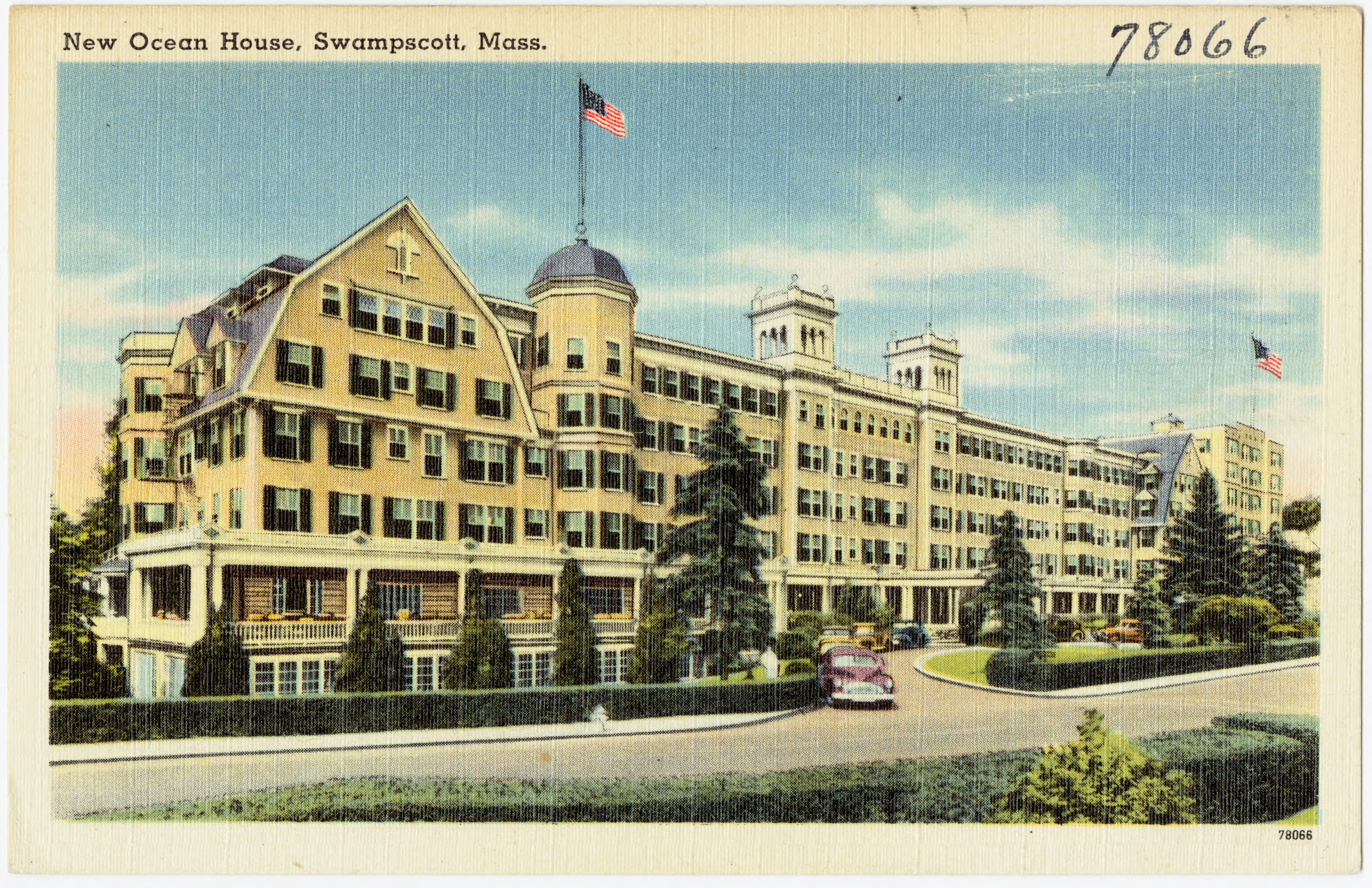

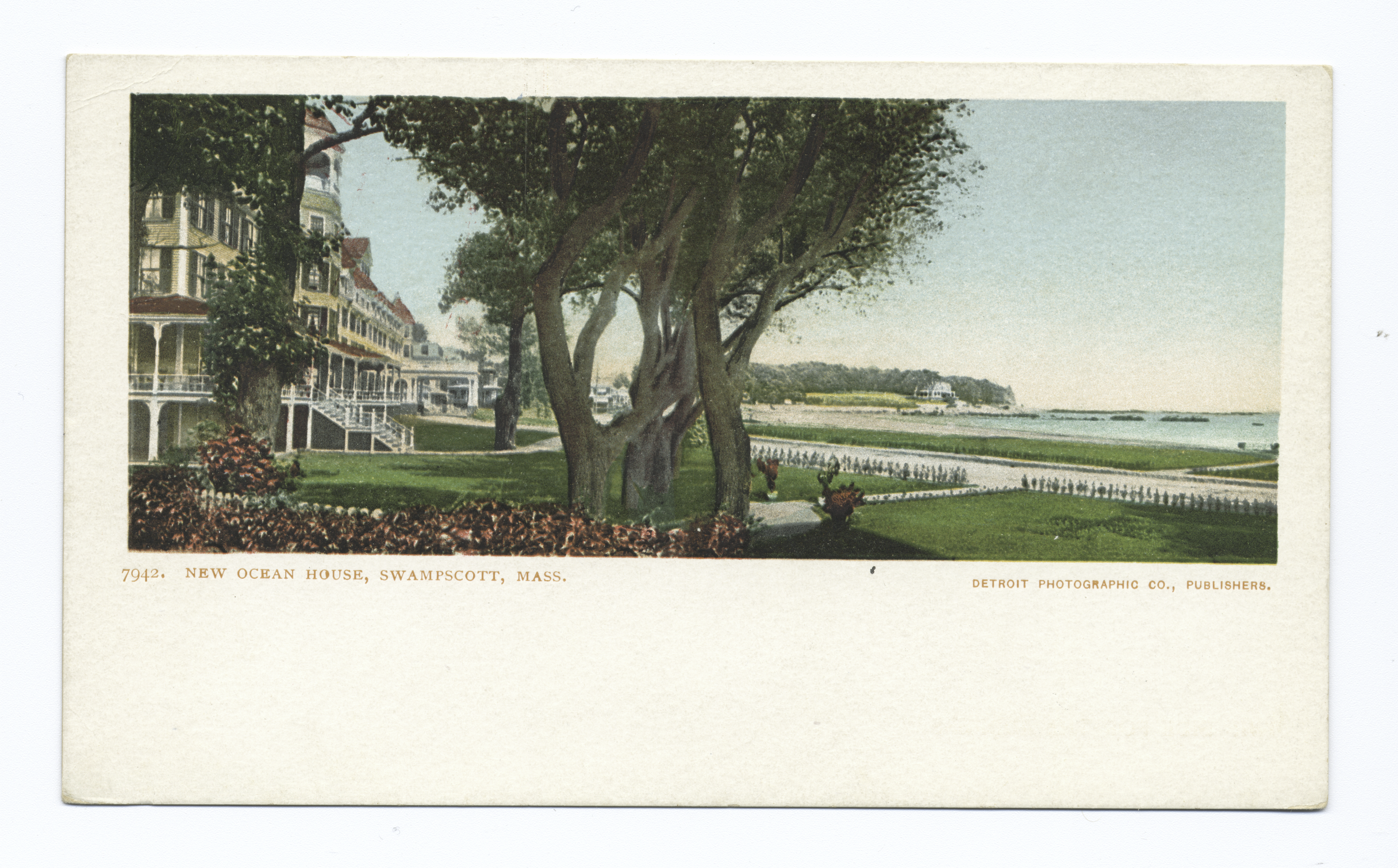

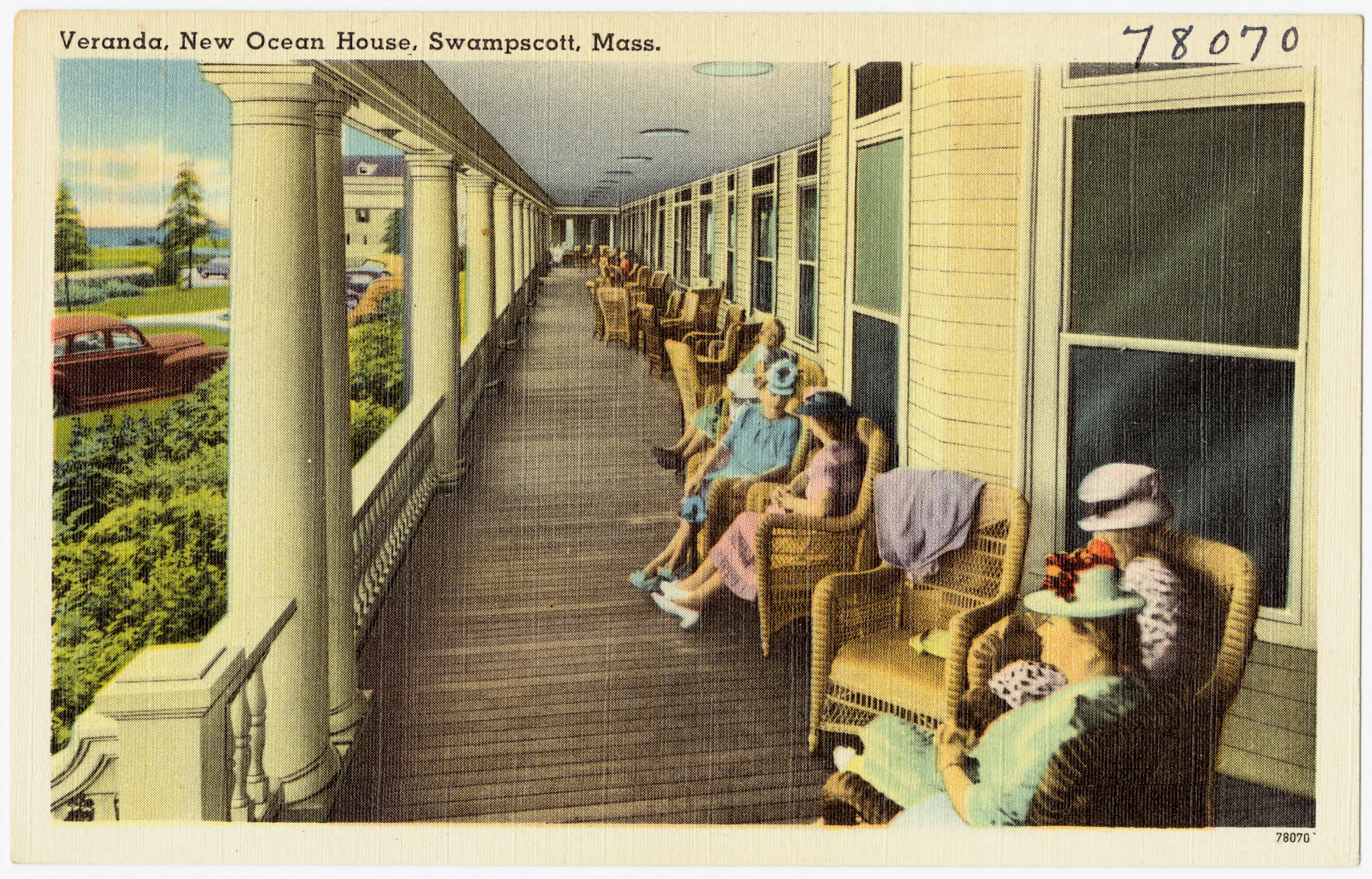

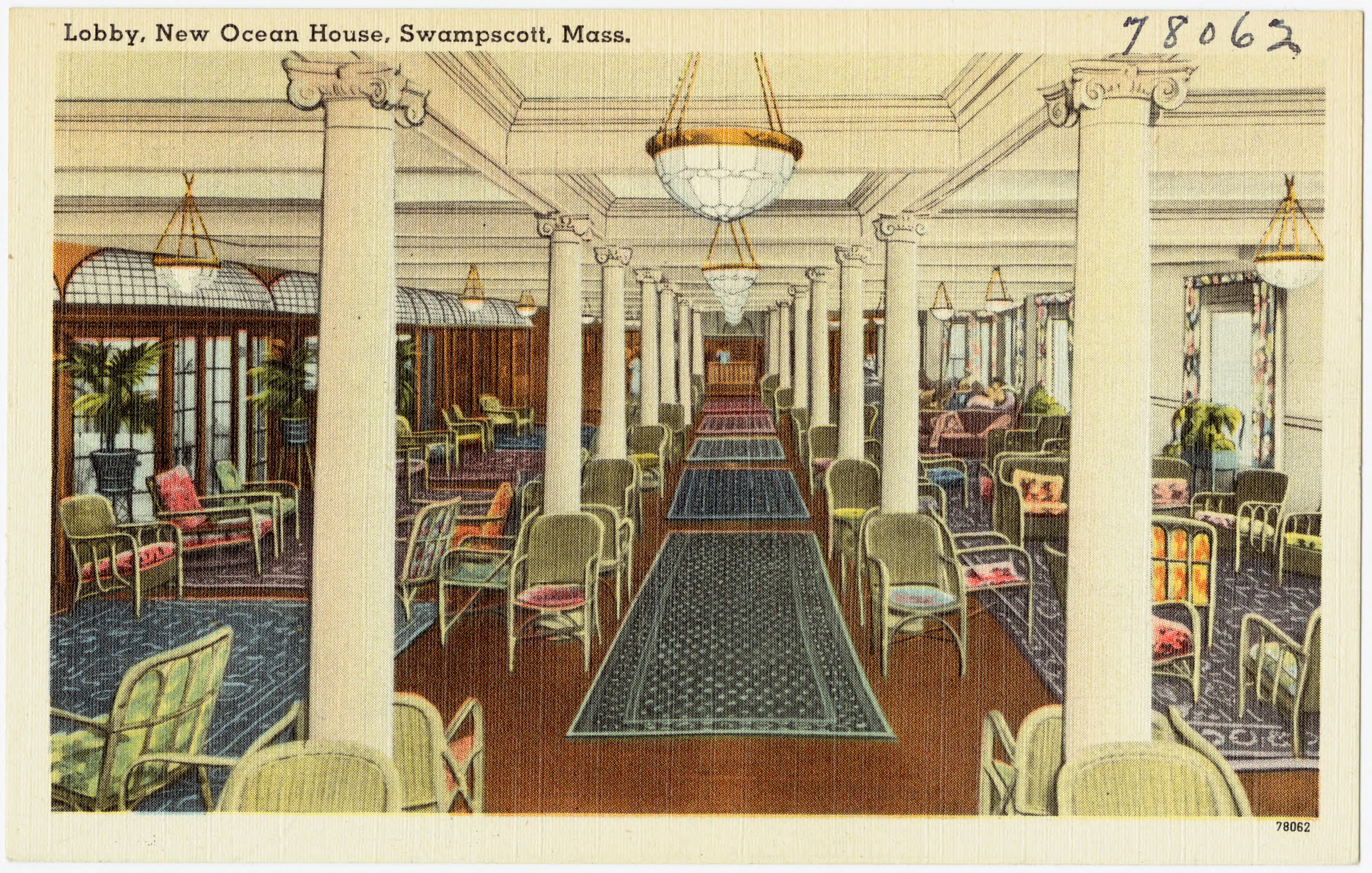

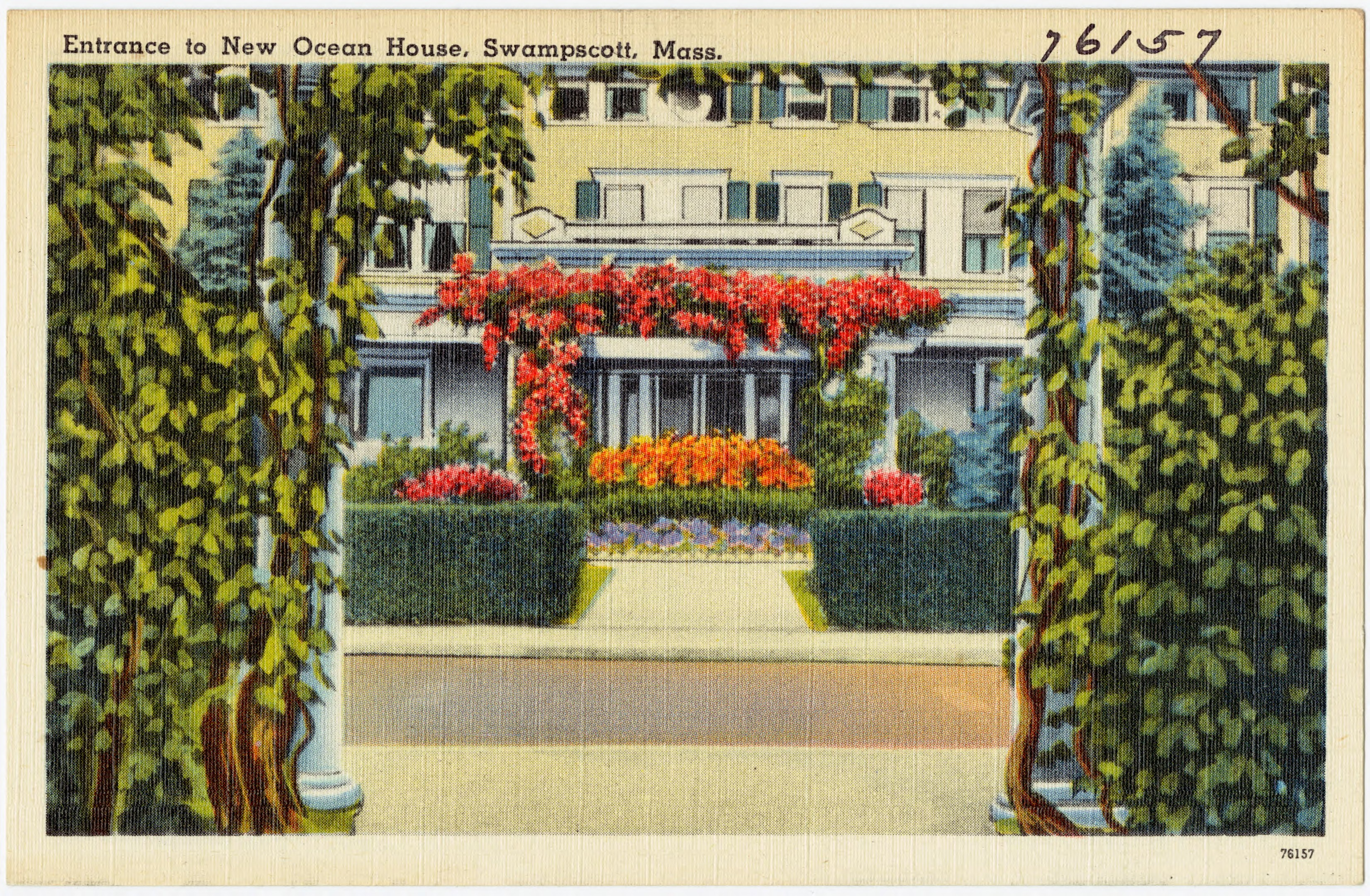

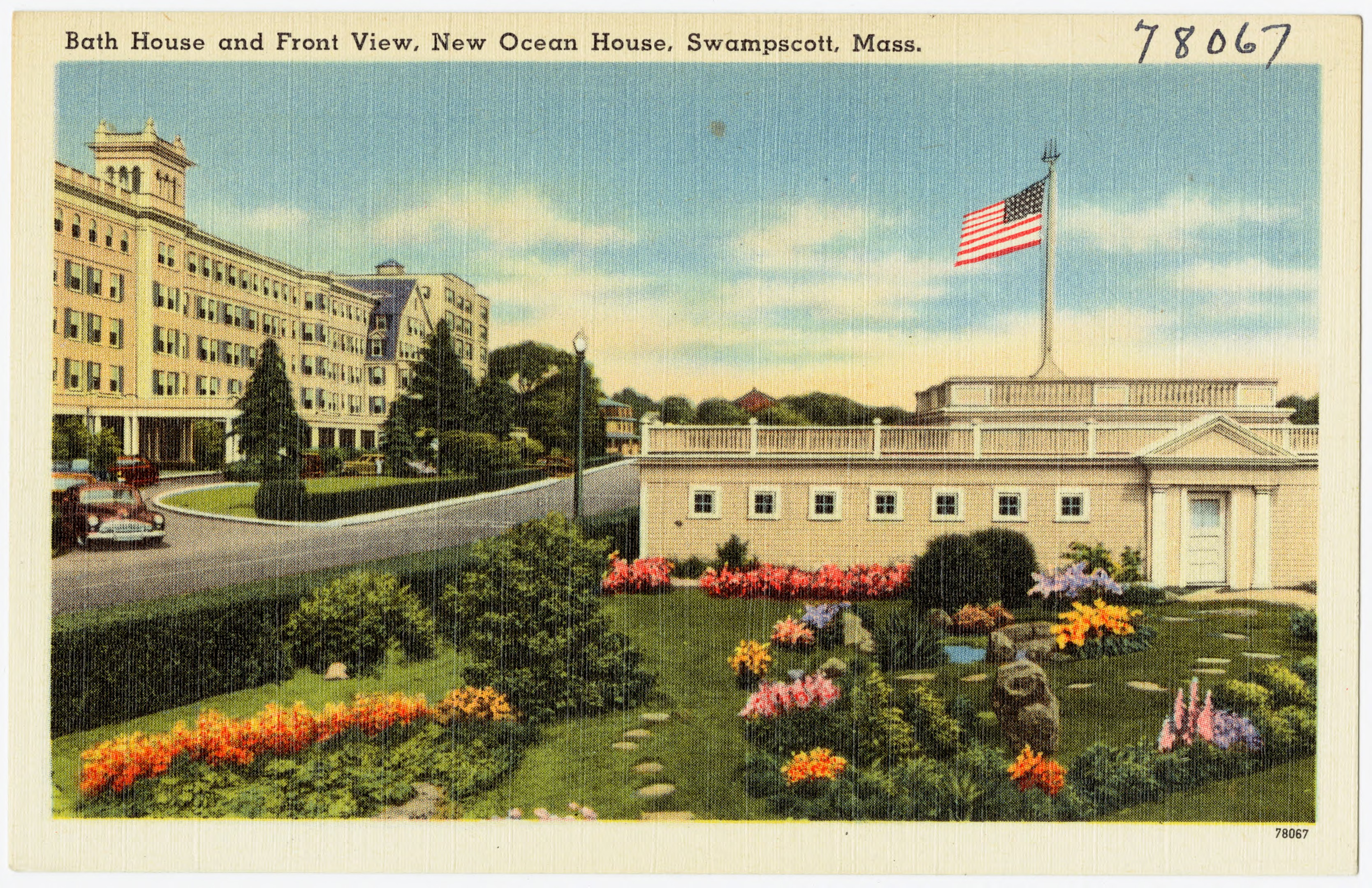

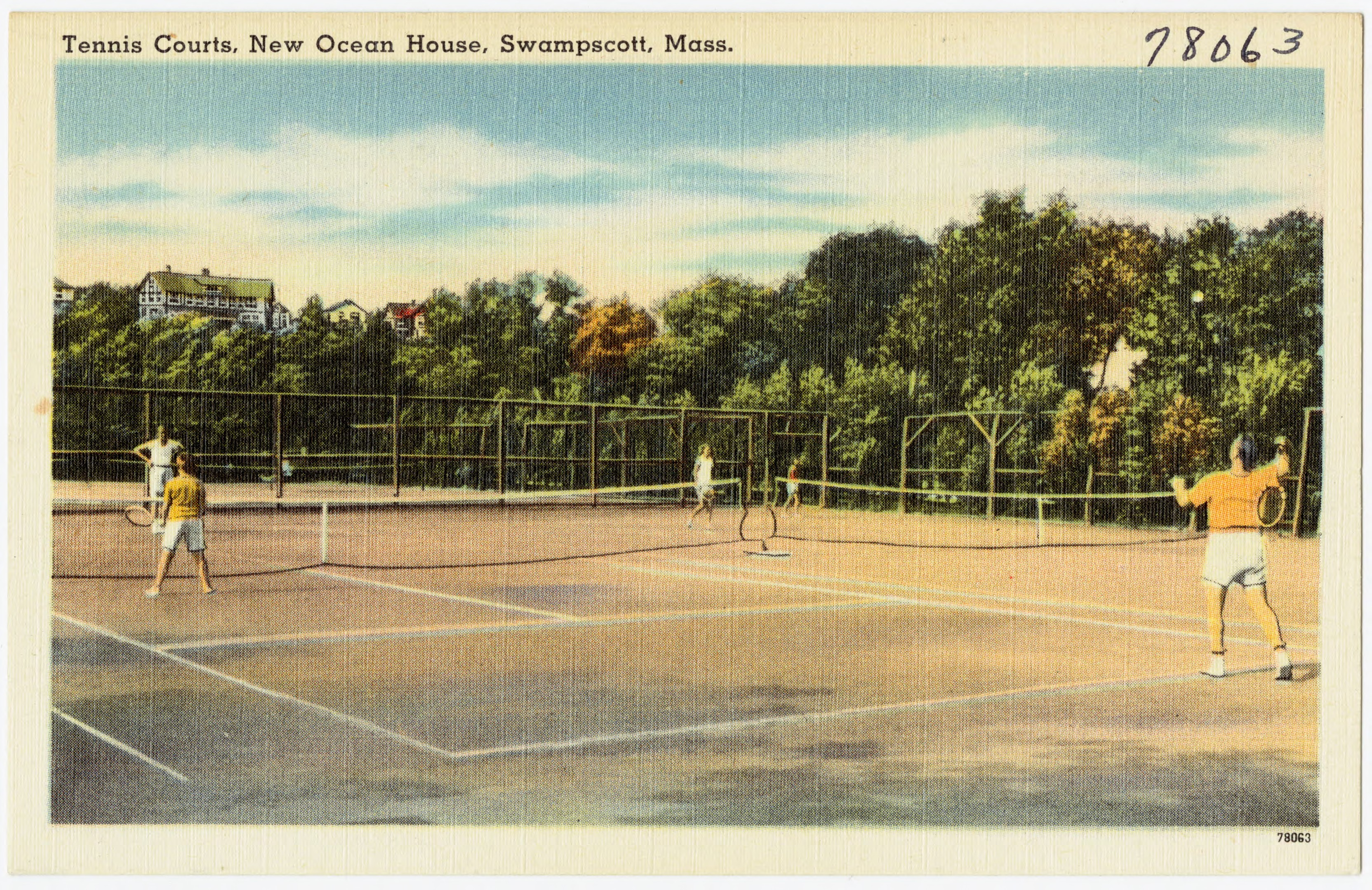

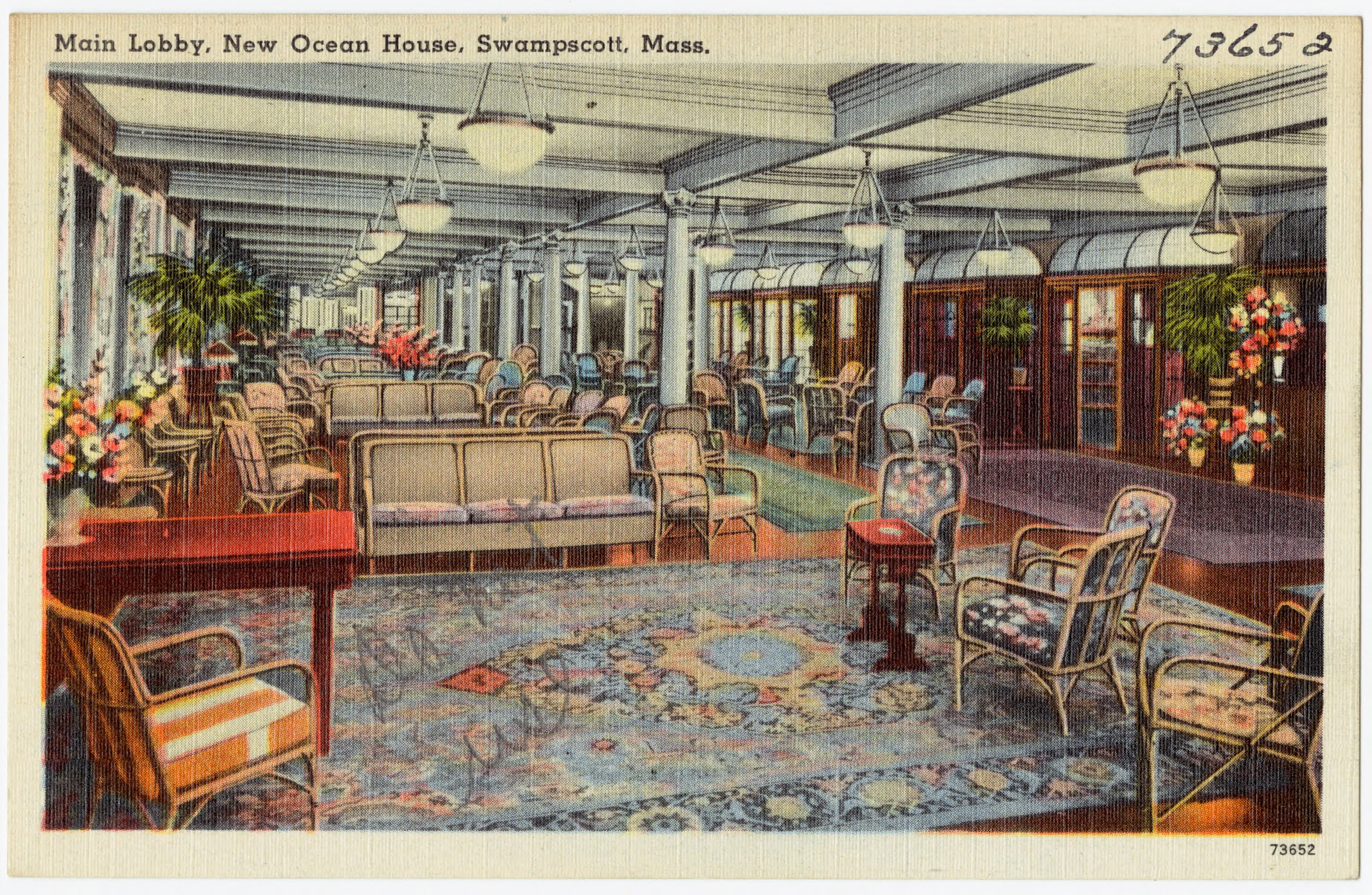

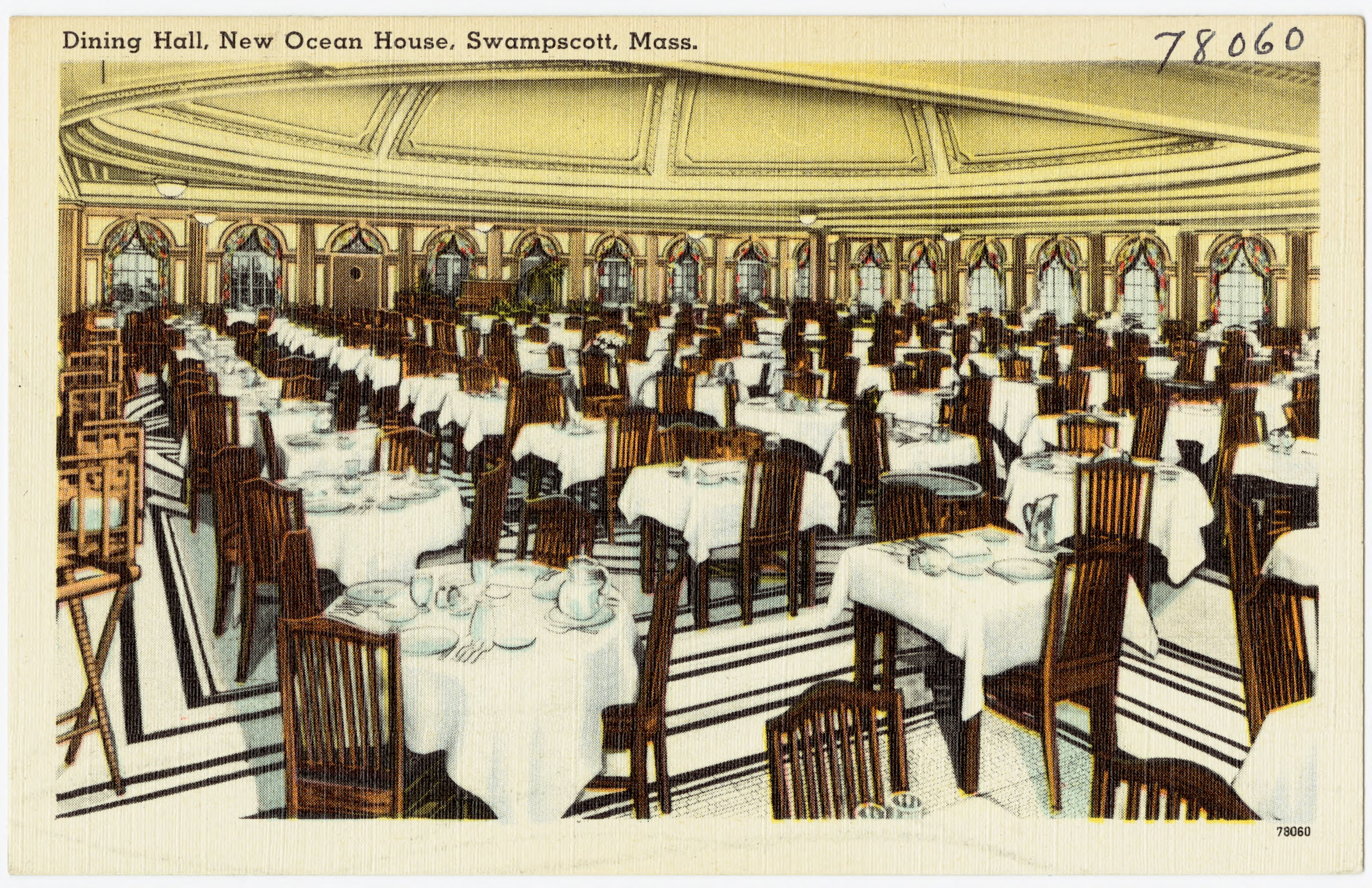

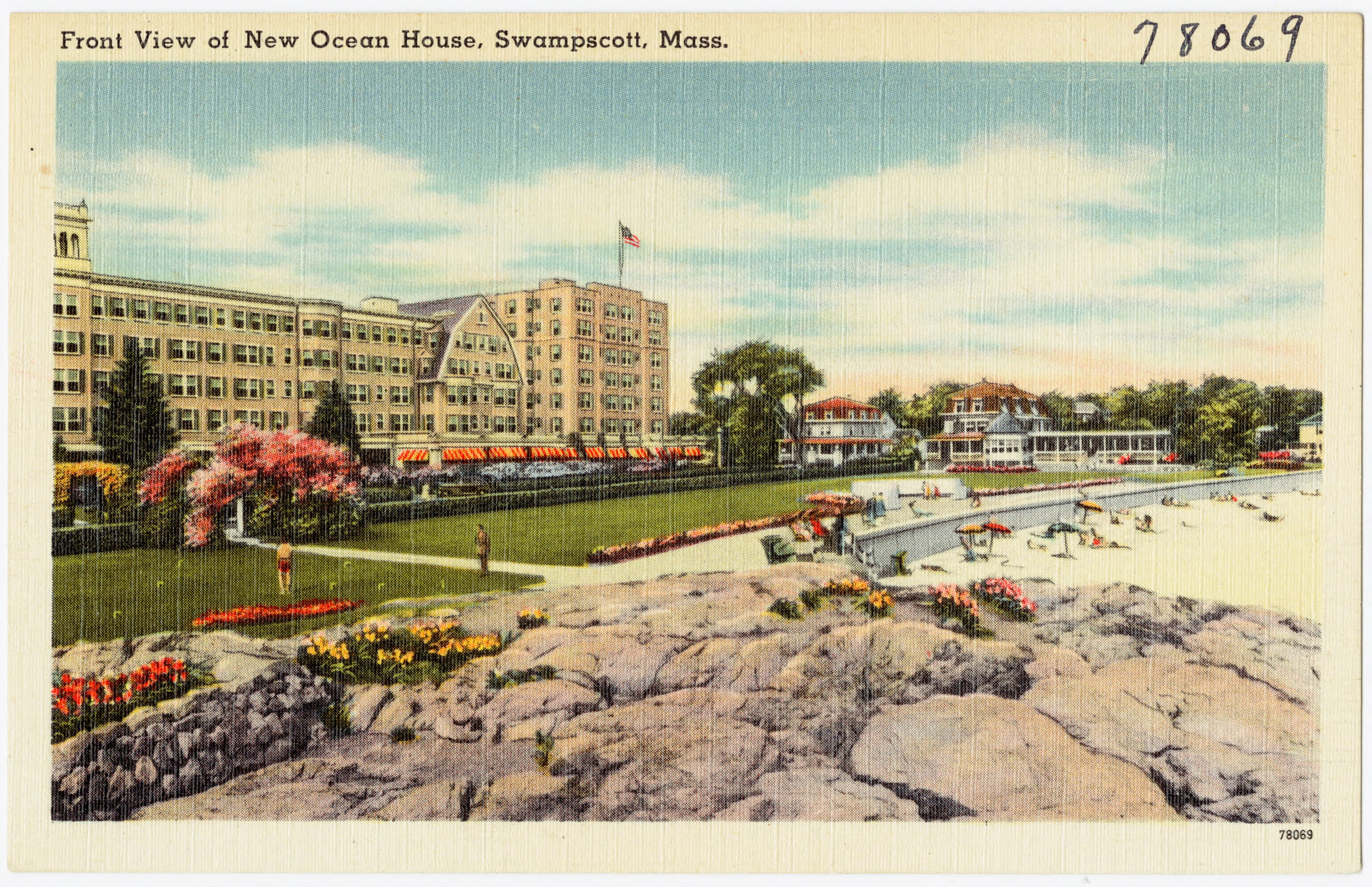

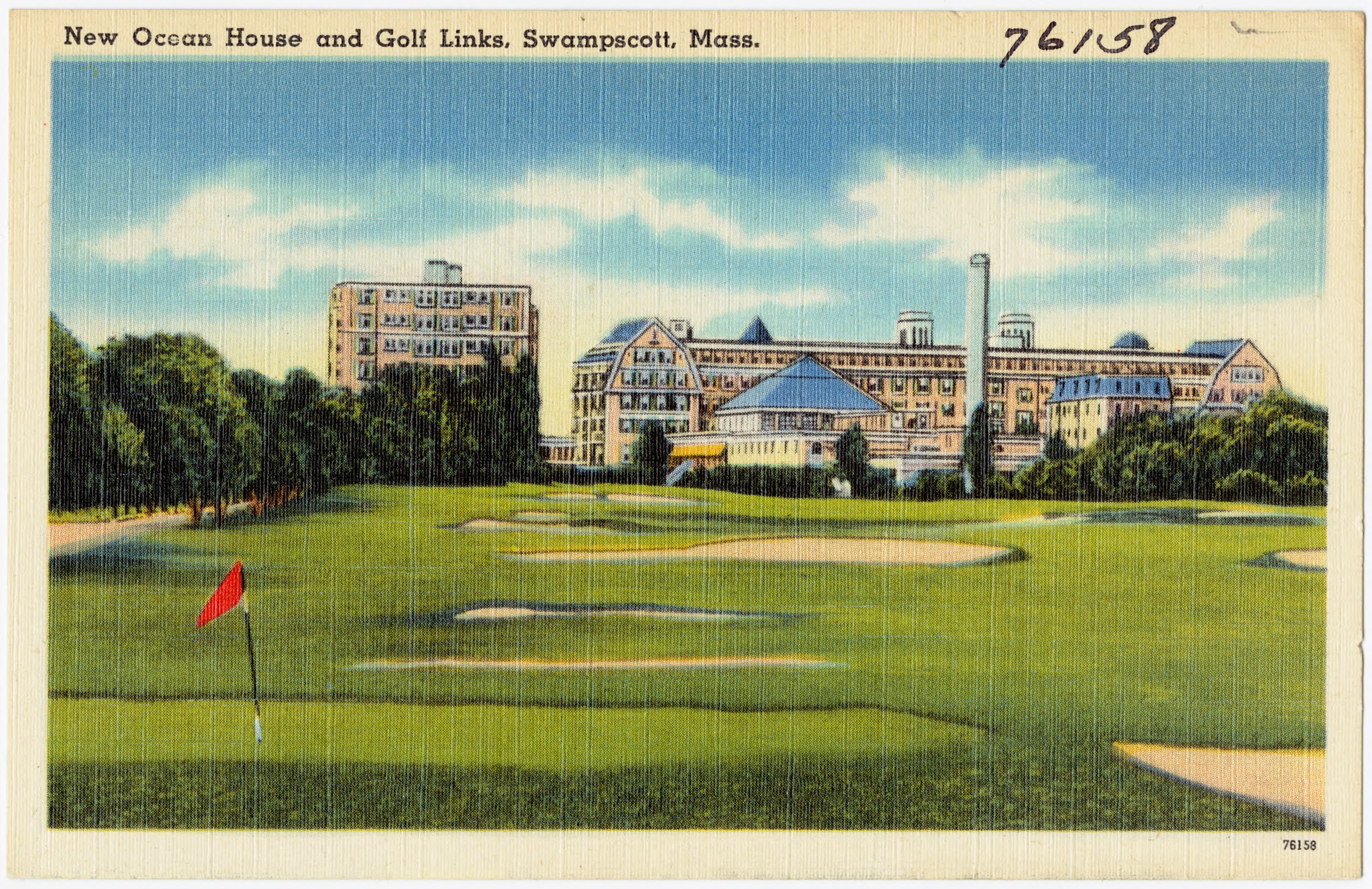

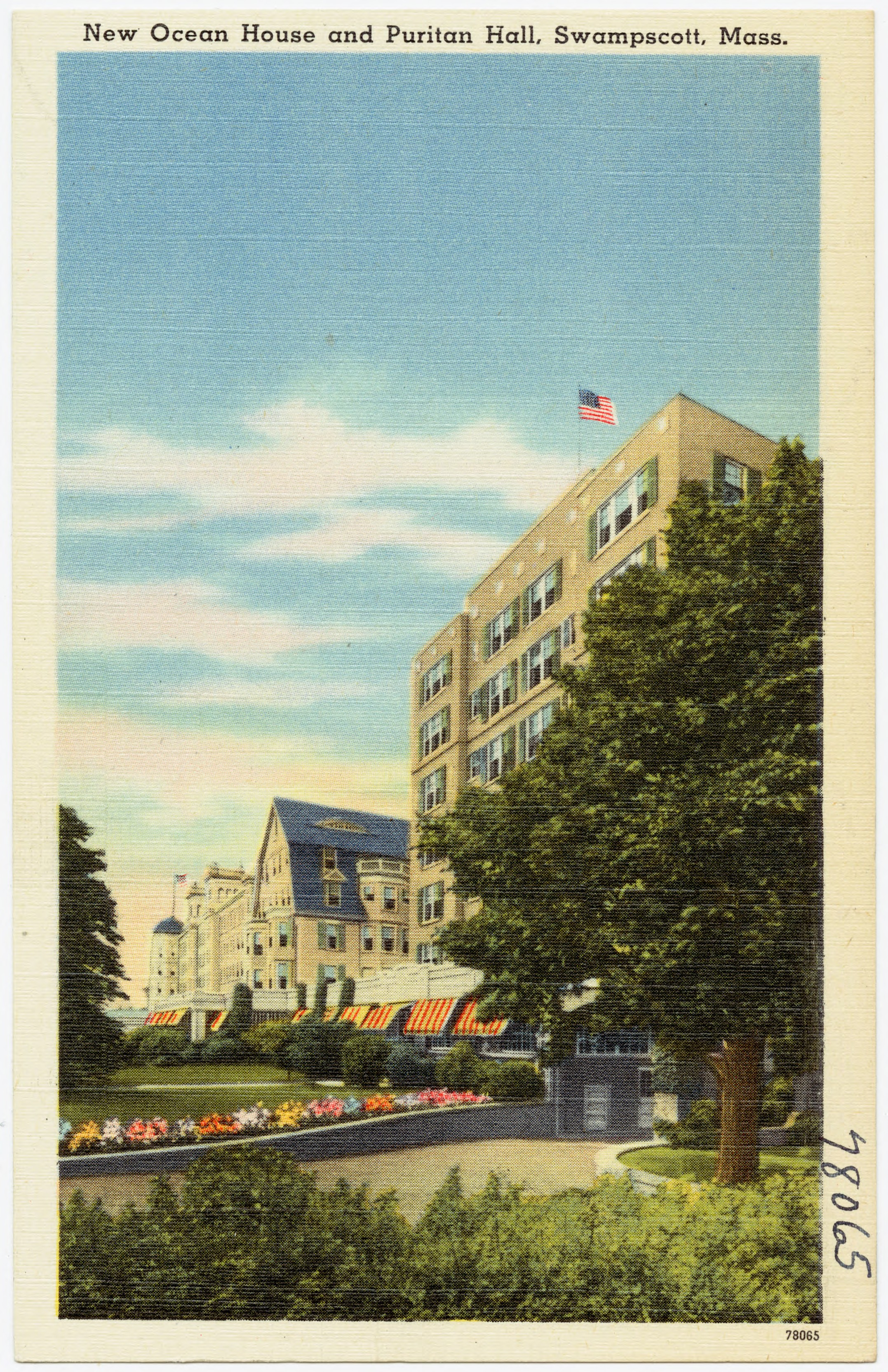

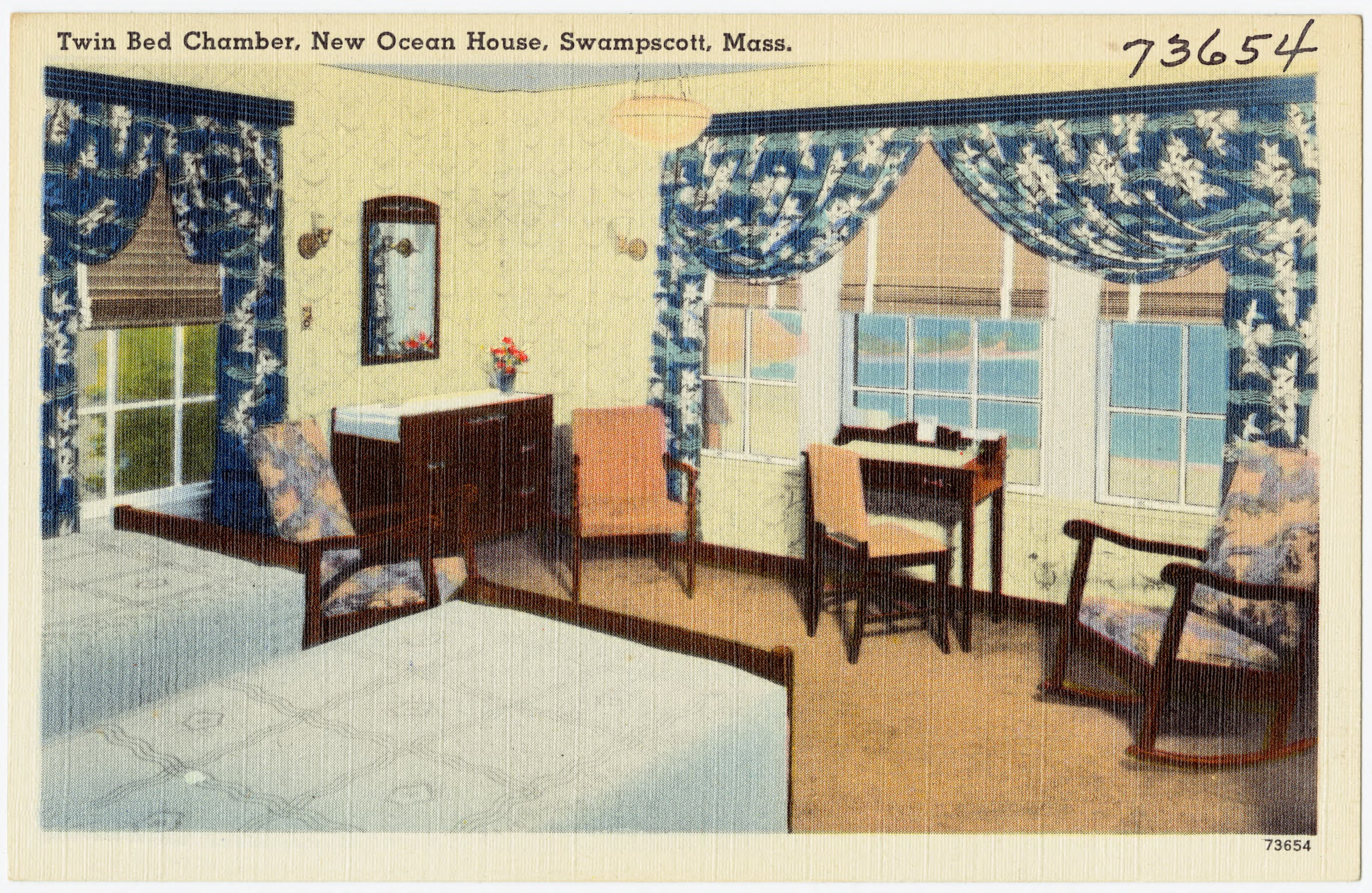

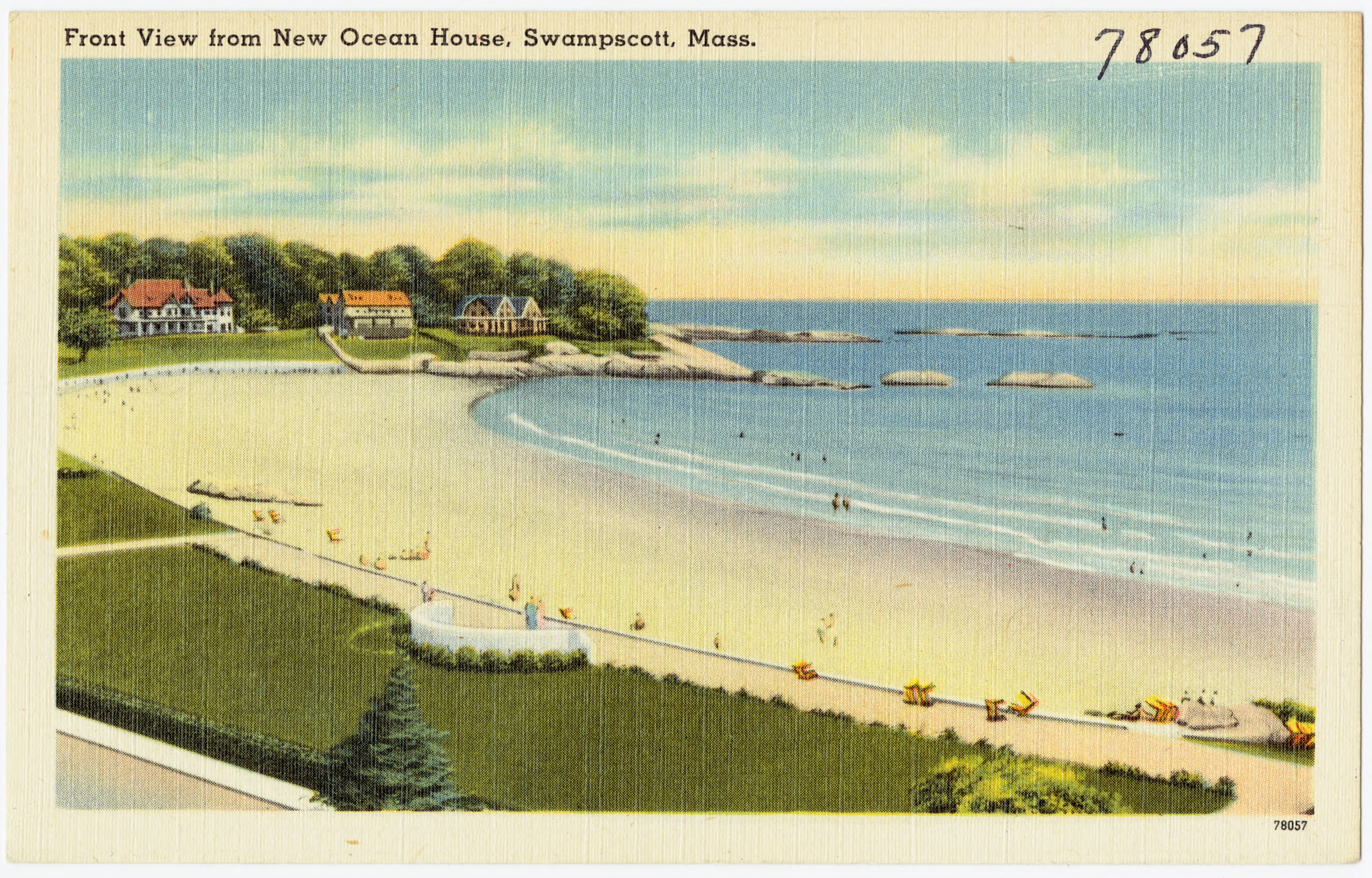

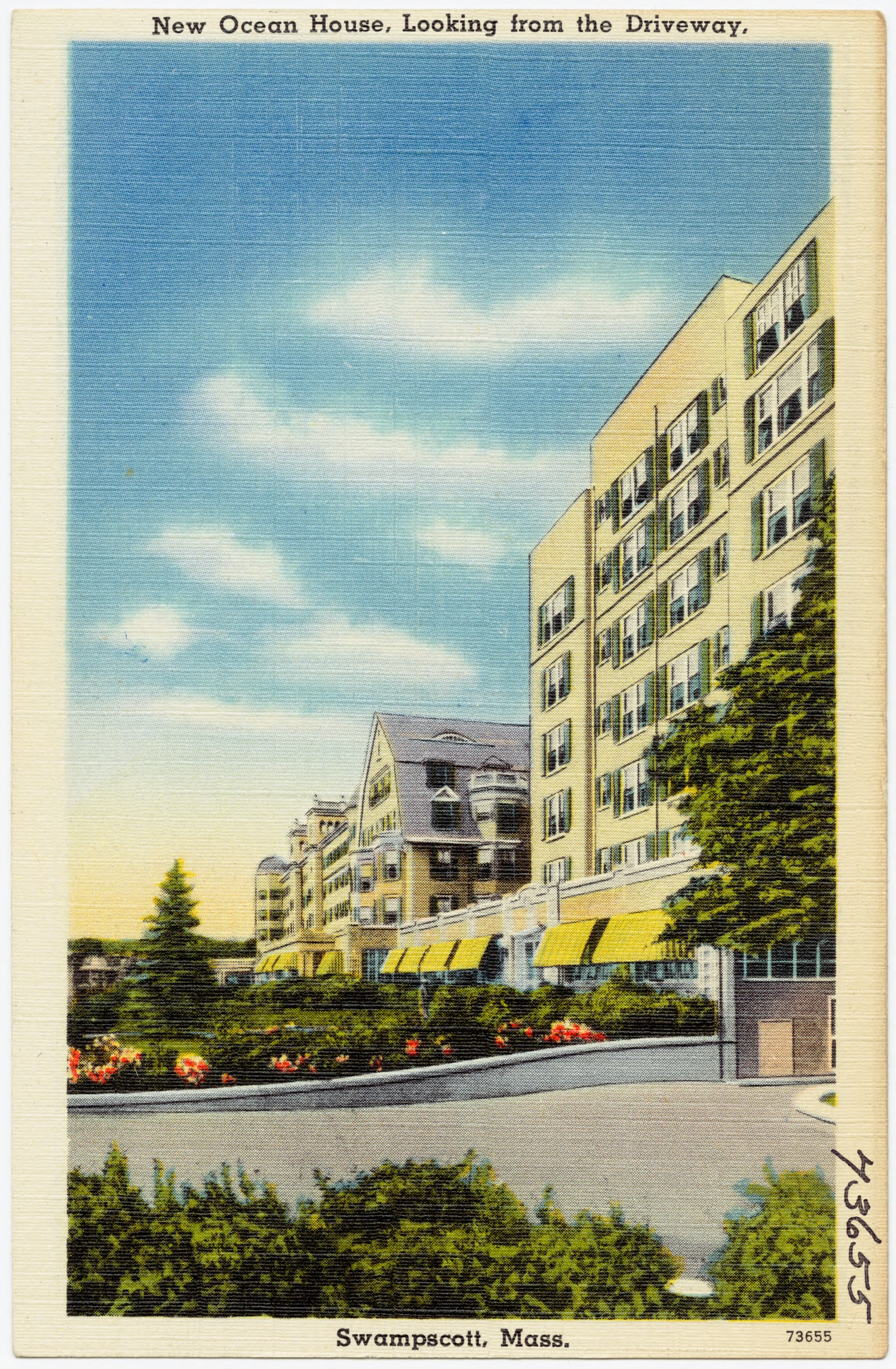

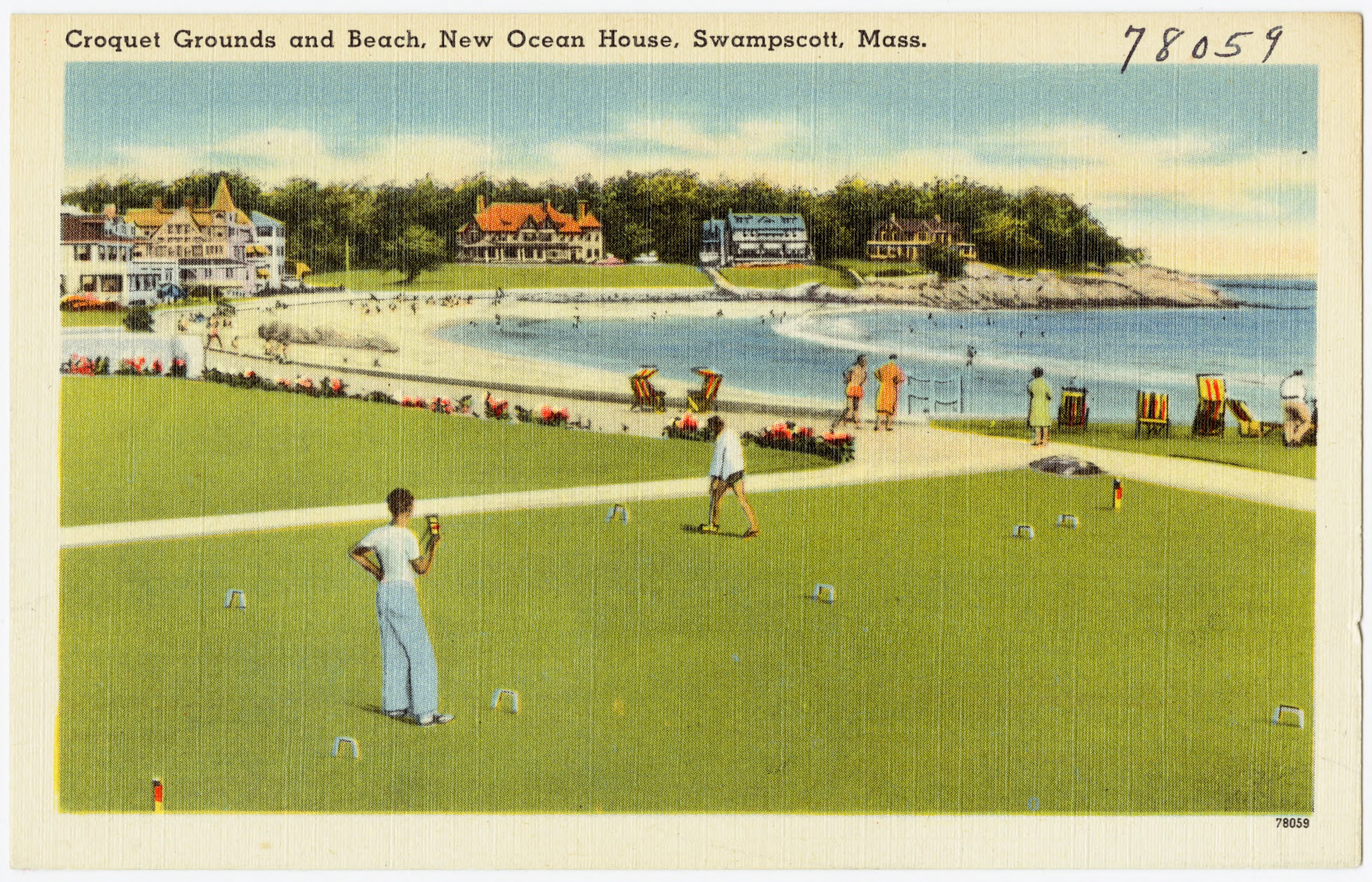

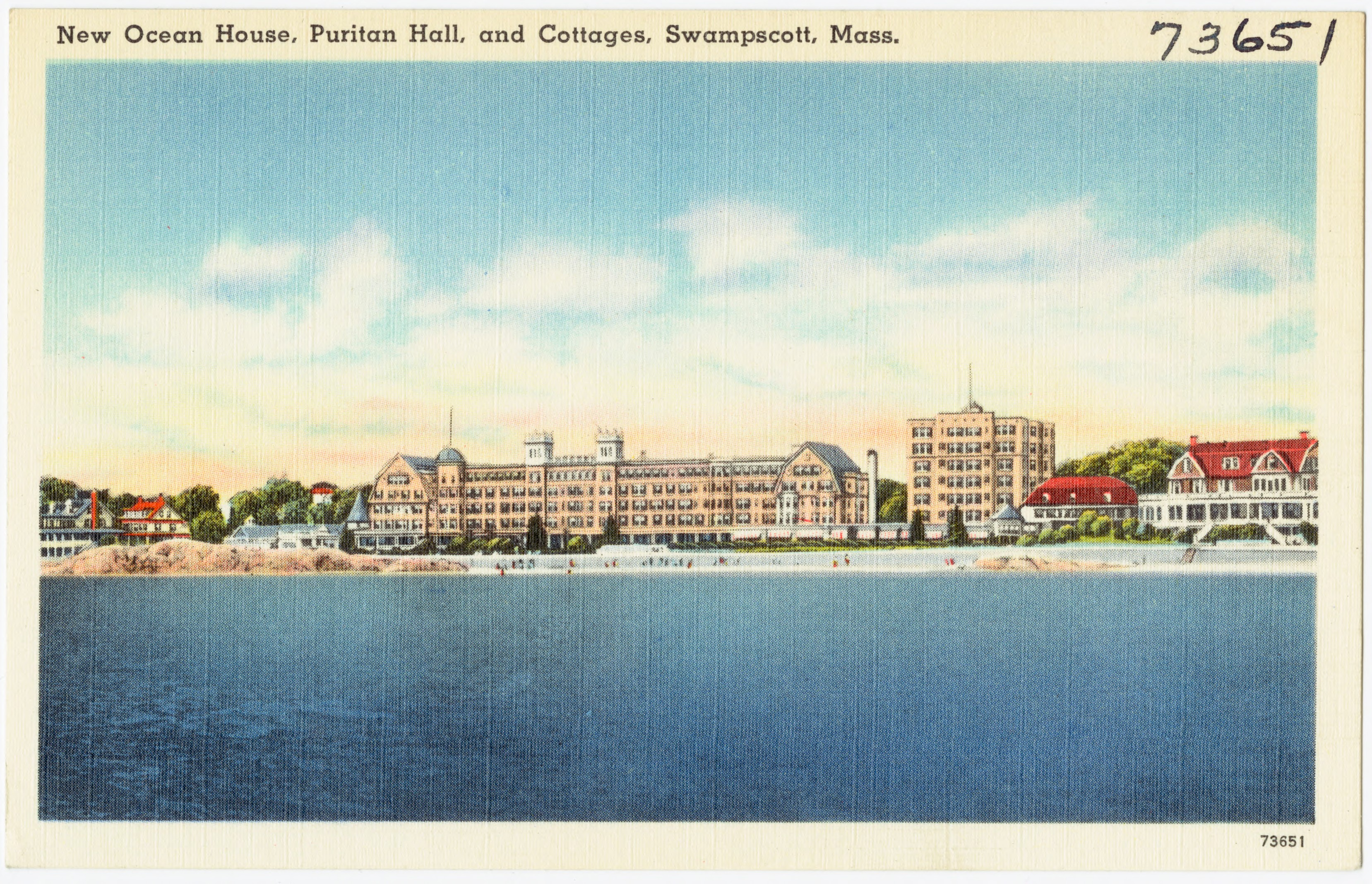

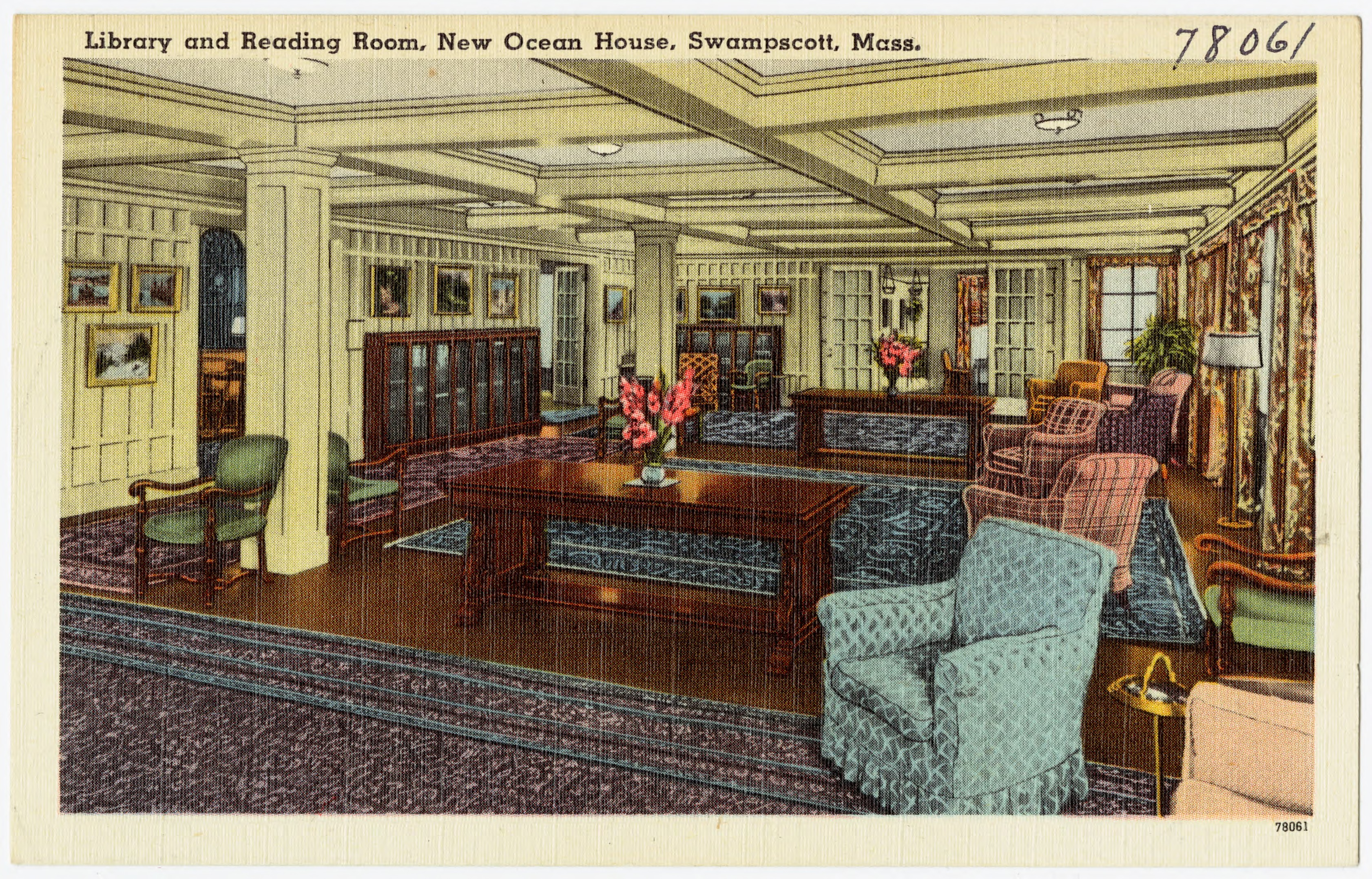

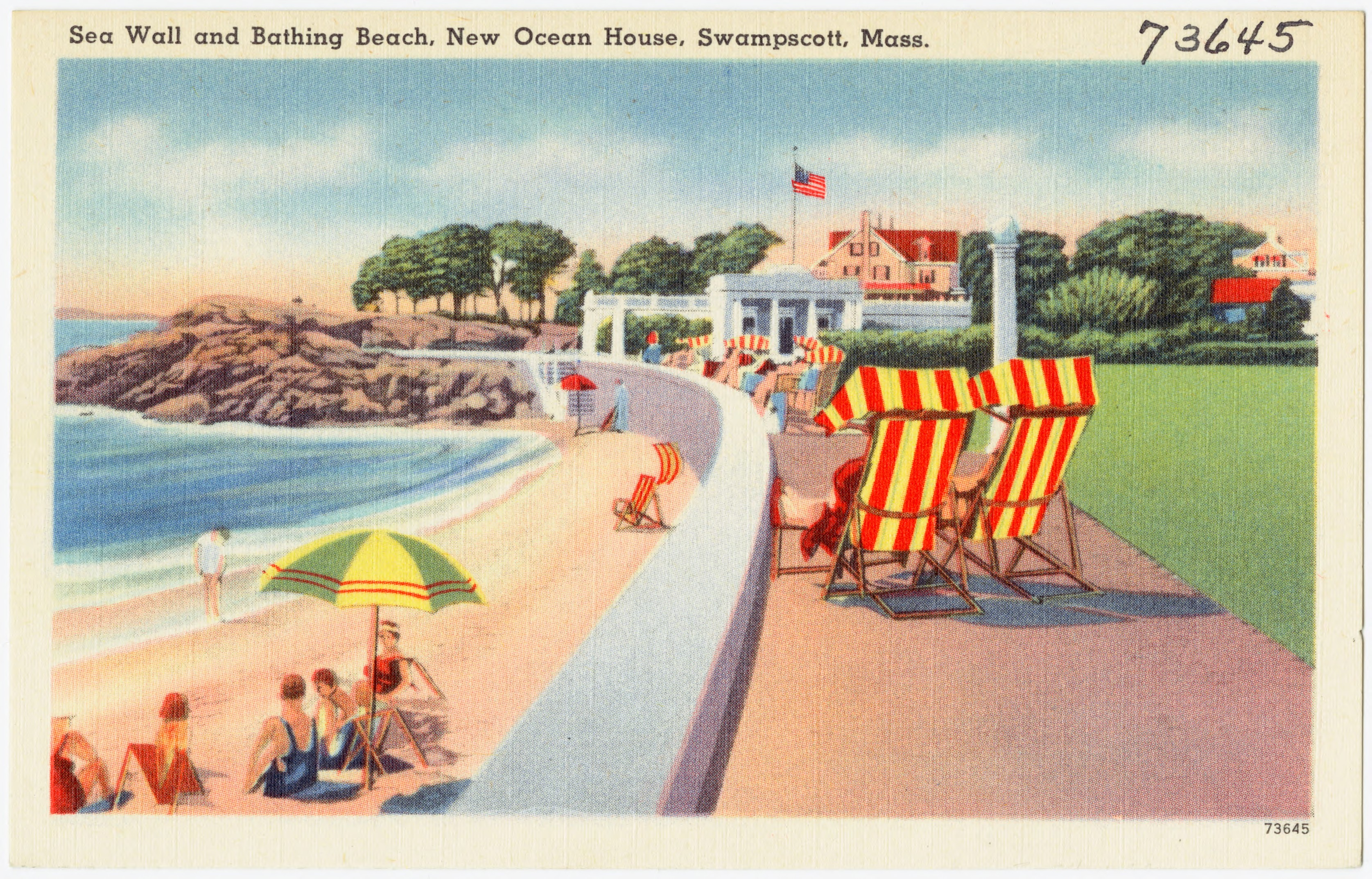

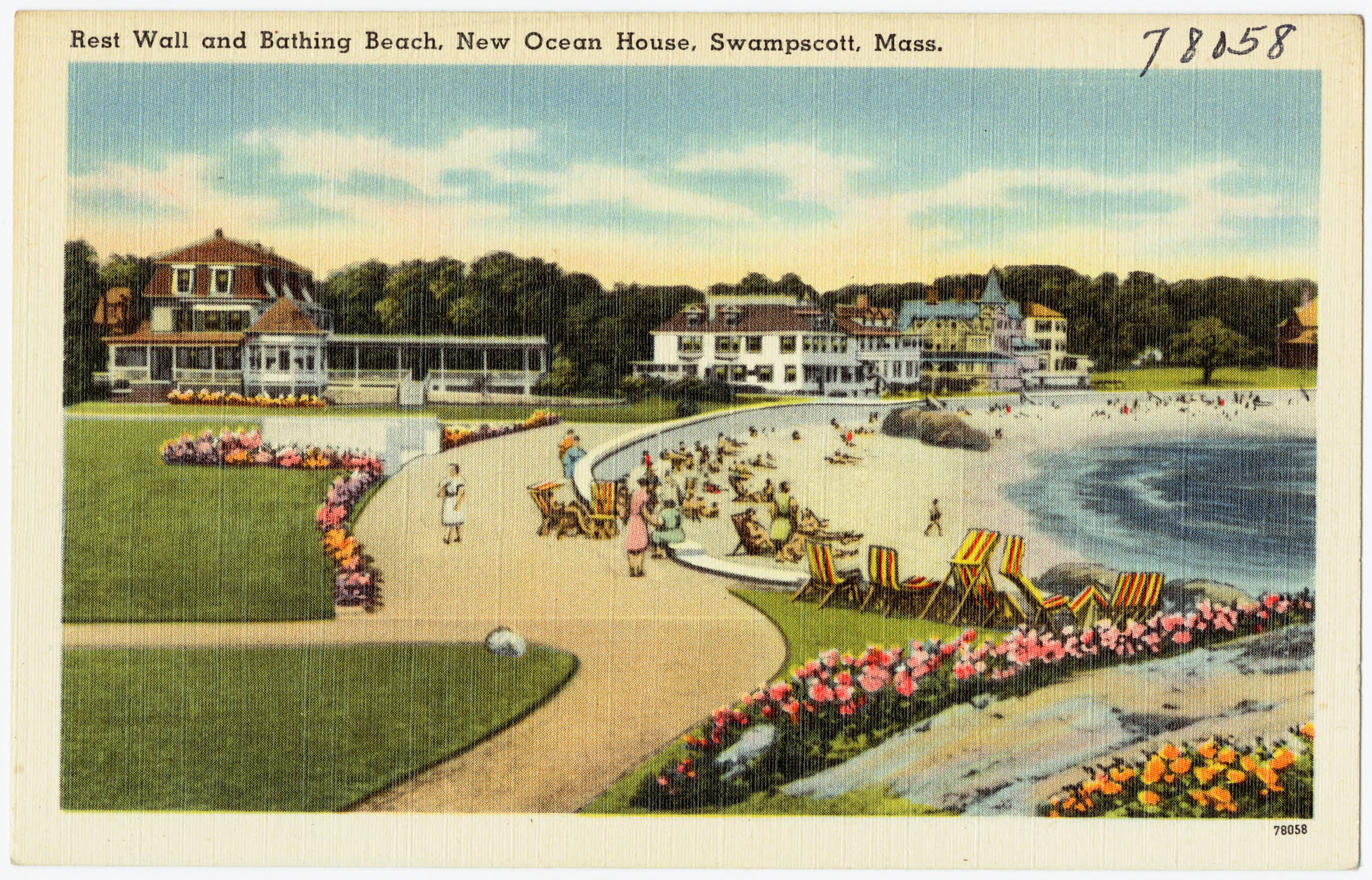

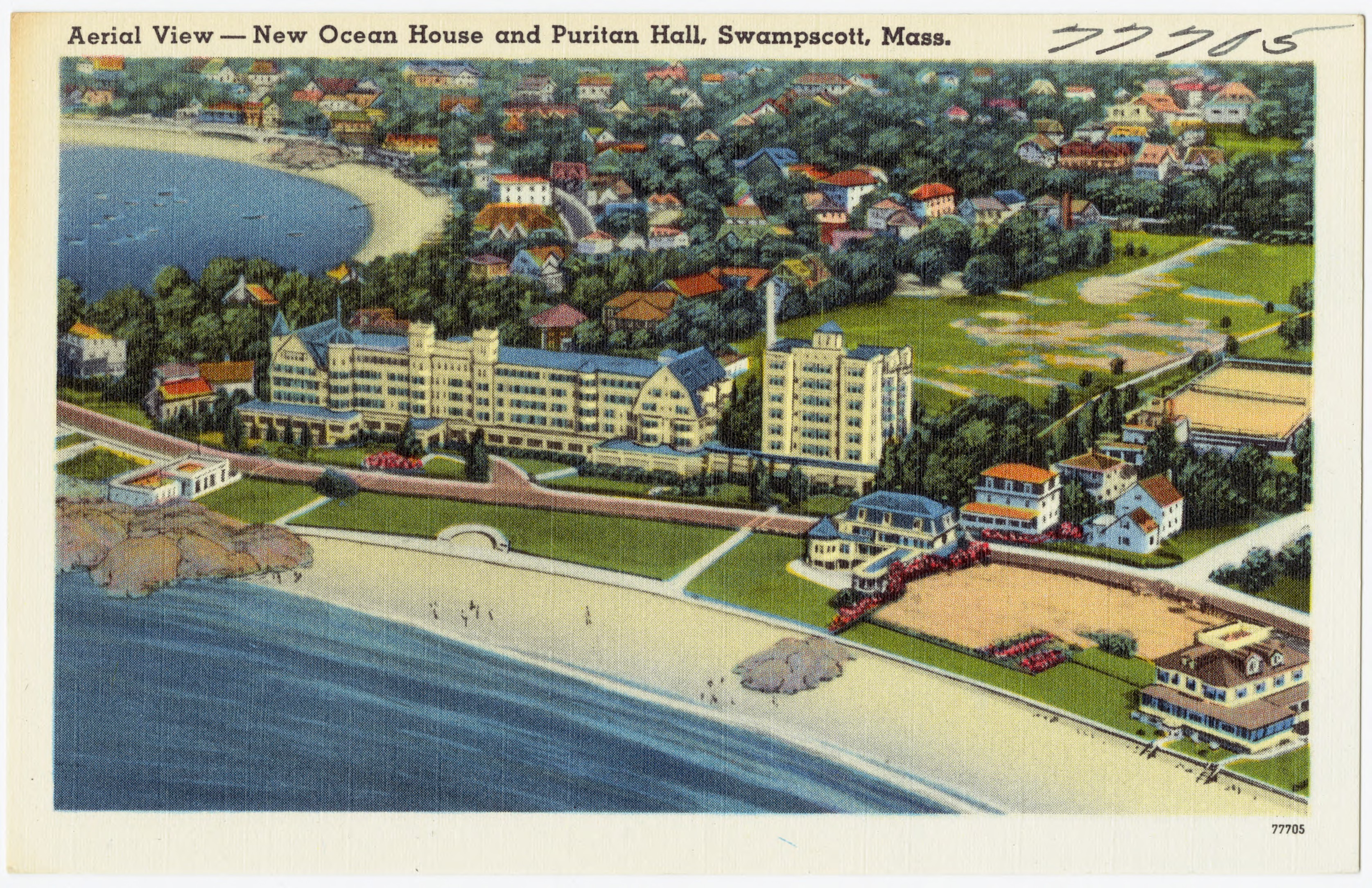

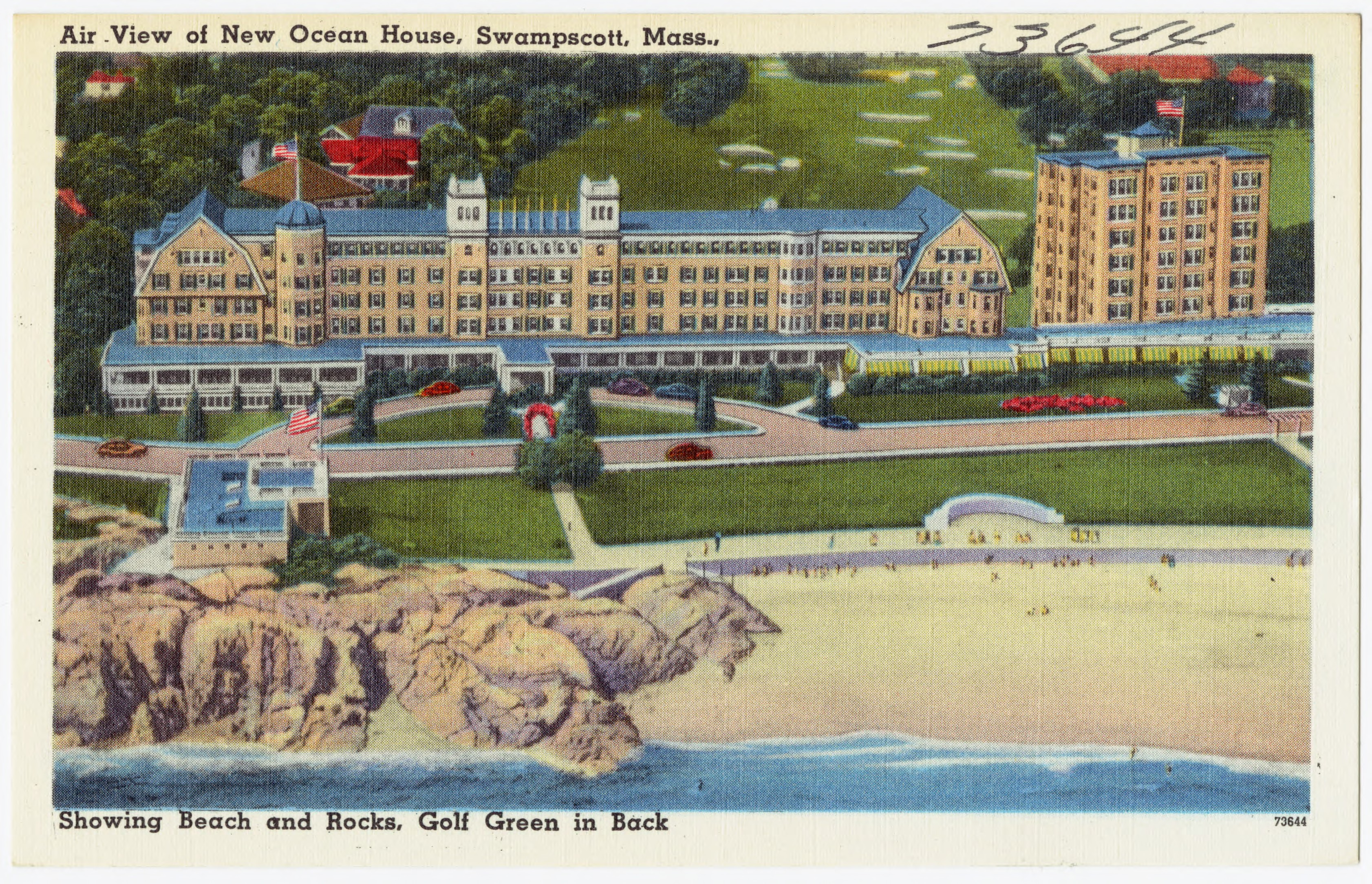

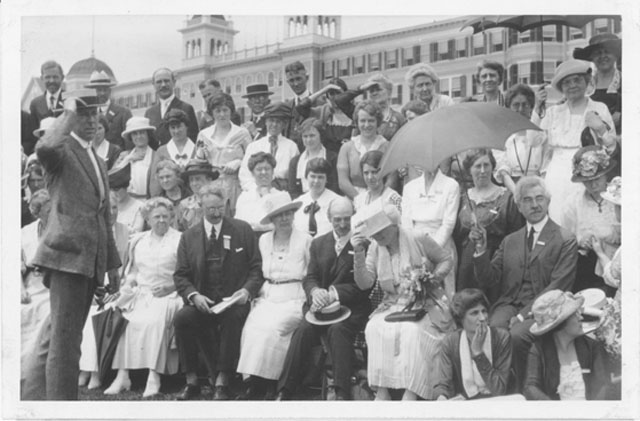

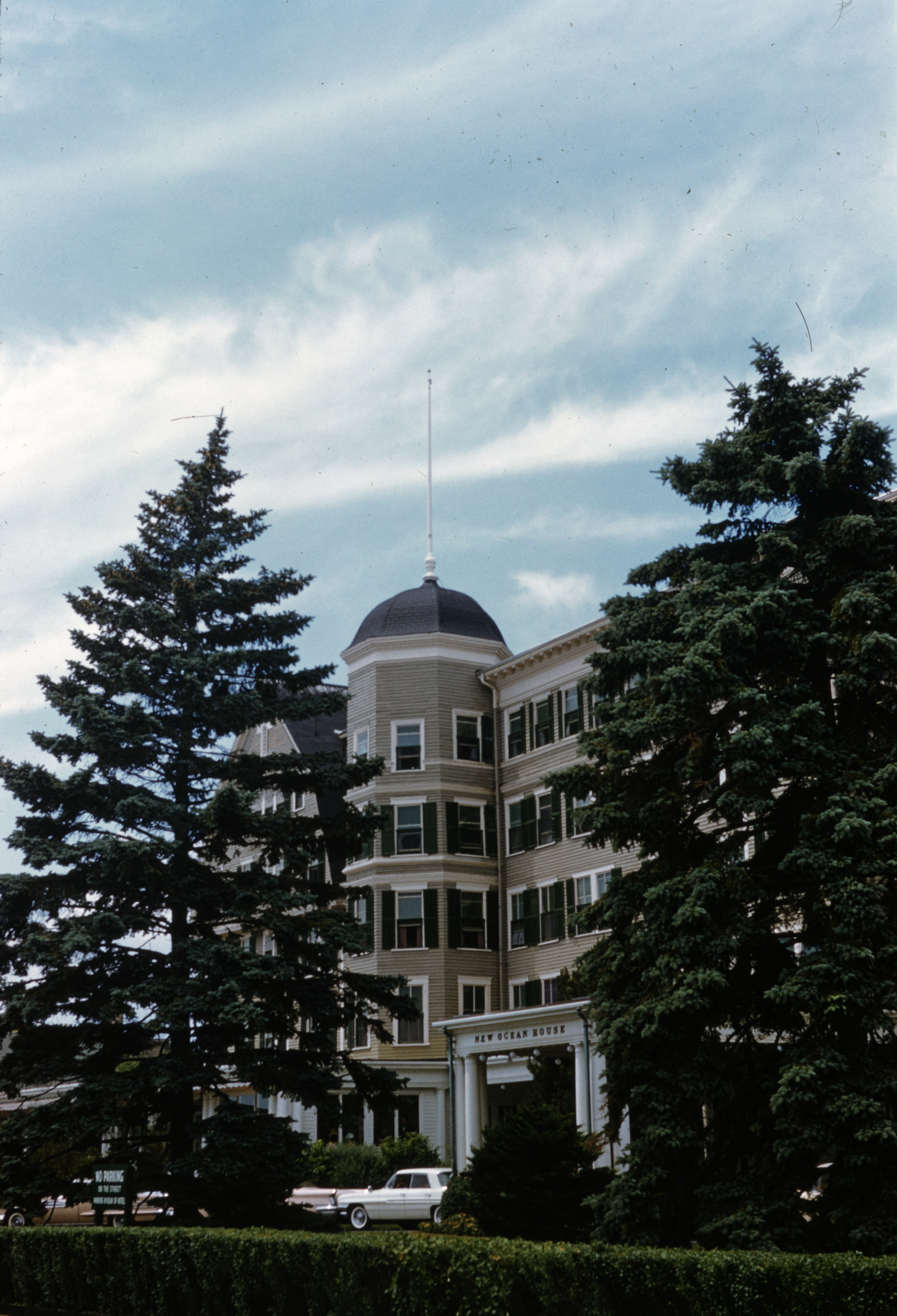
